= Battle of Fort Donelson order of battle =

The order of battle for the Battle of Fort Donelson includes:

- Battle of Fort Donelson order of battle: Confederate
- Battle of Fort Donelson order of battle: Union
