= Battle of Fort Donelson order of battle: Union =

The following Union Army units and commanders fought in the Battle of Fort Donelson of the American Civil War. Order of battle compiled from the casualty returns, and the reports. The Confederate order of battle is listed separately.

== Abbreviations used ==
=== Military Rank ===
- BG = Brigadier General
- Col = Colonel
- Ltc = Lieutenant Colonel
- Maj = Major
- Cpt = Captain
- Lt = 1st Lieutenant

=== Other ===
- w = wounded
- k = killed

== Union Forces ==
=== District of Cairo ===
BG Ulysses S. Grant, Commanding

- Chief of Staff: Col Joseph D. Webster
- Chief of Engineers: Col James B. McPherson
- Assistant Adjutant General: Cpt John A. Rawlins

Division	Brigade	Regiments and Others
First Division BG John A. McClernand	1st Brigade; K-184, W-603, M-66 = 853 Col Richard J. Oglesby	8th Illinois: Ltc Frank L. Rhoads; 18th Illinois: Col Michael K. Lawler (w), Cpt Daniel H. Brush (w), Cpt Samuel B. Marks; 29th Illinois: Col James S. Reardon; 30th Illinois: Ltc Elias S. Dennis; 31st Illinois: Col John A. Logan (w), Cpt Jasper M. Dresser; Battery D, 2nd Illinois Light Artillery: Cpt James P. Timmony; 2nd Illinois Cavalry, Companies A & B: Maj John J. Mudd (w), Cpt John Hotaling; 2nd U.S. Cavalry, Company C: Lt Charles E Farrand; 4th U.S. Cavalry, Company I: Lt James Powell; Carmichael's Illinois Cavalry Company: Cpt Eagleton Carmichael; Dollins' Illinois Cavalry Company: Cpt James J. Dollins; O'Hartnett's Illinois Cavalry Company: Cpt Morris J. O'Harnett; Stewart's Illinois Cavalry Company: Lt Ezra King
First Division BG John A. McClernand	2nd Brigade; K-99, W-350, M-98 = 547 Col William H. L. Wallace	11th Illinois: Ltc Thomas E. G. Ransom (w), Maj Garnett Nevin; 20th Illinois: Col C. Carroll Marsh; 45th Illinois: Col John Eugene Smith; 48th Illinois: Col Isham N. Haynie, Ltc Thomas H. Smith (k); Battery B, 1st Illinois Light Artillery: Cpt Ezra Taylor; Battery D, 1st Illinois Light Artillery: Cpt Edward McAllister; 4th Illinois Cavalry: Col Theophilus Lyle Dickey
First Division BG John A. McClernand	3rd Brigade; K-28, W-105, M-19 = 152 Col William R. Morrison (w); Col Isham N. Haynie; Col Leonard F. Ross	17th Illinois: Col Leonard F. Ross, Maj Francis M. Smith, Cpt Henry H. Bush; 49th Illinois: Ltc Phineas Pease; Battery H, 1st Missouri Light Artillery: Cpt Frederick Welker; Battery K, 1st Missouri Light Artillery: Cpt George H. Stone
Second Division BG Charles F. Smith	1st Brigade; K-69, W-340, M-20 = 429 Col John McArthur	9th Illinois: Ltc Jesse J. Phillips; 12th Illinois: Ltc Augustus L. Chetlain; 41st Illinois: Col Isaac C. Pugh
Second Division BG Charles F. Smith	3rd Brigade; K-10, W-109, M-2 = 121 Col John Cook	7th Illinois: Ltc Andrew J. Babcock; 28th Illinois: Col Amory K. Johnston; 50th Illinois: Col Moses M. Bane; 52nd Illinois: Col Thomas W. Sweeny; 12th Iowa: Col Joseph J. Wood; 52nd Indiana: Col James M. Smith; 13th Missouri: Col Crafts J. Wright; Battery D, 1st Missouri Light Artillery: Cpt Henry Richardson
Second Division BG Charles F. Smith	4th Brigade; K-55, W-301, M-1 = 357 Col Jacob G. Lauman	2nd Iowa: Col James Tuttle; 7th Iowa: Ltc James Parrott; 14th Iowa: Col William T. Shaw; 25th Indiana: Col James C. Veatch; Birge's Western Sharpshooters: Col John W. Birge
Second Division BG Charles F. Smith	5th Brigade; K-11, W-69, M-0 = 80 Col Morgan L. Smith	11th Indiana: Col George F. McGinnis; 8th Missouri: Maj John McDonald
Third Division BG Lew Wallace	1st Brigade; K-35, W-182, M-16 = 233 Col Charles Cruft	31st Indiana: Ltc John Osborn, Maj Fred Arn; 44th Indiana: Col Hugh B. Reed; 17th Kentucky: Col John H. McHenry, Jr.; 25th Kentucky: Col James M. Shackelford
Third Division BG Lew Wallace	2nd Brigade; K-6, W-15, M-1 = 22	46th Illinois: Col John A. Davis; 57th Illinois: Col Silas D. Baldwin; 58th Illinois: Col William F. Lynch; 20th Ohio: Col Charles Whittlesey - Arrived Feb. 14, held in reserve on Feb. 15.
Third Division BG Lew Wallace	3rd Brigade; K-3, W-24, M-1 = 28 Col John M. Thayer	1st Nebraska: Ltc William McCord; 58th Ohio: Ltc Ferdinand F. Rempel; 68th Ohio: Col Samuel H. Steedman; 76th Ohio: Col William B. Woods
Third Division BG Lew Wallace	Unattached; K-0, W-20, M-0 = 20	Battery A, 1st Illinois Light Artillery: Lt Peter P. Wood; 32nd Illinois, Company A: Cpt Henry Davidson

=== Western Flotilla ===
Flag Officer Andrew H. Foote (w)

Class	Vessel
City class ironclad	U.S.S. St. Louis Lieutenant Leonard Paulding (K-2, W-8, M-0 = 10)
City class ironclad	U.S.S. Carondelet Commander Henry Walke (K-5, W-28, M-0 = 33)
City class ironclad	U.S.S. Louisville Commander Benjamin M. Dove (K-4, W-5, M-0 = 9)
City class ironclad	U.S.S. Pittsburgh Lieutenant Egbert Thompson (K-0, W-2, M-0 = 2)
Timberclad	U.S.S. Tyler Lieutenant William Gwin
Timberclad	U.S.S. Conestoga Lieutenant Seth L. Phelps
Timberclad	U.S.S. Lexington Lieutenant James Shirk

=== Rear Guard ===
These units were attached to the District of Cairo but were posted to guard duty and did not take part in the campaign against Fort Donelson.

Post	Brigade	Regiments and Others
Bird's Point, MO	4th Brigade (1st Division) Col James D. Morgan	10th Illinois: Ltc John Tillson; 16th Illinois: Col Robert F. Smith; 22nd Illinois: Ltc Harrison E. Hart; 10th Iowa: Col Nicholas Perczel
Cairo, IL	Brigade BG Eleazar A. Paine	51st Illinois: Col Gilbert W. Cumming; Artillery, 4 batteries

== See also ==
- Tennessee in the American Civil War
