= Battle of Fort Donelson order of battle: Confederate =

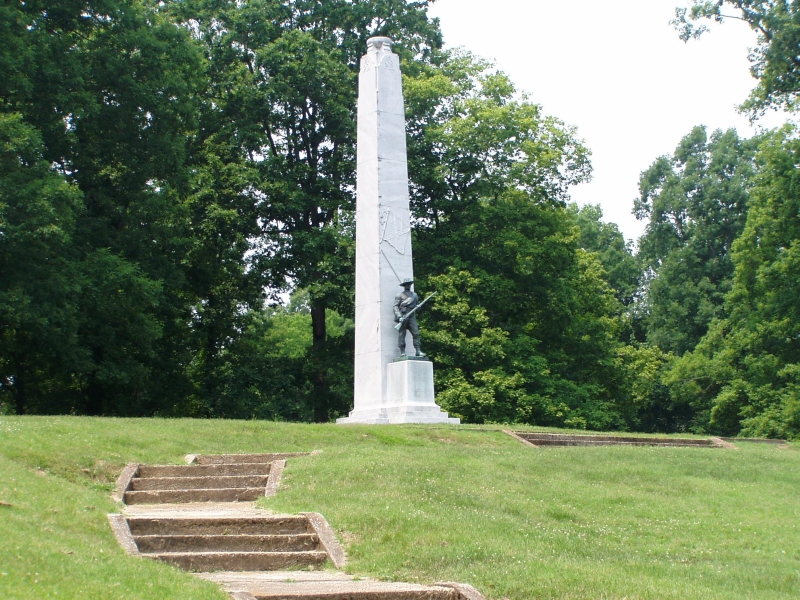
Confederate Memorial

The following Confederate Army units and commanders fought in the Battle of Fort Donelson of the American Civil War. Order of battle compiled from the army organization, and the reports. The Union order of battle is listed separately.

== Abbreviations used ==
=== Military Rank ===
- BG = Brigadier General
- Col = Colonel
- Ltc = Lieutenant Colonel
- Maj = Major
- Cpt = Captain

== Army of Central Kentucky ==
General Albert Sidney Johnston Not present at battle

=== Fort Donelson ===
BG Bushrod Johnson Feb 9
BG Gideon J. Pillow Feb 9-13
BG John B. Floyd Feb 13-16
BG Gideon J. Pillow Feb 16
BG Simon B. Buckner, Sr. Feb 16

Division	Brigade	Regiments and Others
Right Wing BG Simon B. Buckner, Sr.	2nd Brigade (attached to 3rd Brigade)	2nd Kentucky: Col Roger Hanson; 14th Mississippi: Maj Washington Doss; 41st Tennessee: Col Robert Farquharson
Right Wing BG Simon B. Buckner, Sr.	3rd Brigade Col John C. Brown	3rd Tennessee: Ltc Thomas Gordon (w), Maj N. F. Cheairs; 18th Tennessee: Col Joseph B. Palmer; 32nd Tennessee: Col Edmond Cook
Left Wing BG Gideon Johnson Pillow; BG Bushrod Johnson	1st Brigade Col Adolphus Heiman	27th Alabama: Col Adolphus Hughes; 10th Tennessee: Ltc Randal W. McGavock; 42nd Tennessee: Col William A. Quarles; 48th Tennessee: Col William Voorhies; 53rd Tennessee: Col Alfred Abernathy, Ltc Thomas F. Winston
Left Wing BG Gideon Johnson Pillow; BG Bushrod Johnson	2nd Brigade Col Thomas J. Davidson; Col John M. Simonton; Col John Gregg	8th Kentucky: Ltc Hylan B. Lyon; 1st Mississippi: Col John M. Simonton, Ltc A. S. Hamilton; 23rd Mississippi: Ltc Joseph Wells; 7th Texas: Col John Gregg
Left Wing BG Gideon Johnson Pillow; BG Bushrod Johnson	3rd Brigade Col Joseph Drake	3rd Alabama Battalion: Maj John Garvin; 15th Arkansas: Col James M. Gee; 4th Mississippi: Maj Thomas Adaire
Left Wing BG Gideon Johnson Pillow; BG Bushrod Johnson	4th Brigade (Fort Donelson Garrison) Col John W. Head	30th Tennessee: Col John W. Head; 49th Tennessee: Col James Bailey; 50th Tennessee: Col Cyrus Sugg; 1st Tennessee Battalion: Maj Steven Colms; Stankiewicz's Tennessee Battery: Lt Peter Stankiewicz
Left Wing BG Gideon Johnson Pillow; BG Bushrod Johnson	5th Brigade Col Gabriel C. Wharton	51st Virginia Infantry: Ltc James Massie; 56th Virginia Infantry: Col Phillip Slaughter
Left Wing BG Gideon Johnson Pillow; BG Bushrod Johnson	6th Brigade Col John McCausland	20th Mississippi: Maj William Brown; 36th Virginia: Ltc Leigh Reid; 50th Virginia: Maj Charles Thorburn
Left Wing BG Gideon Johnson Pillow; BG Bushrod Johnson	7th Brigade Col William E. Baldwin	26th Mississippi: Col Arthur Reynolds; 26th Tennessee: Col John Lillard
Attached Units	Cavalry Brigade Lt Col Nathan B. Forrest	3rd Tennessee Cavalry Ltc Nathan Bedford Forrest; 9th Tennessee Cavalry Ltc George Gantt; 1st Kentucky Cavalry, Company D: Cpt S.B. Williams; 1st Kentucky Cavalry, Company G: Cpt M.D. Willcox; 1st Kentucky Cavalry, Company K: Cpt James Huey; Melton's Kentucky Cavalry Company : Cpt James Melton
Attached Units	Artillery Lt Col Milton Haynes	French's Mercer (VA) Battery: Cpt Napoleon B. French; Gauley (VA) Artillery: Cpt Stephen Adams; Goochland (VA) Battery: Cpt John Guy; Kanawha (VA) Artillery: Cpt Thomas E. Jackson; Graves' Kentucky Battery: Cpt Rice E. Graves; Green's Kentucky Battery: Cpt Henry Green; Maney's Tennessee Battery: Cpt Frank Maney (w); Porter's Tennessee Battery: Cpt Thomas Porter (w), Lt John W. Morton; Ross' Tennessee Battery: Cpt Ruben Ross; Culbertson's Tennessee Battery: Cpt Jacob Culbertson; 51st Tennessee: Col. B.M. Browder

== See also ==
- Tennessee in the American Civil War
