= Isham N. Haynie =

American general

Isham Nicholas Haynie
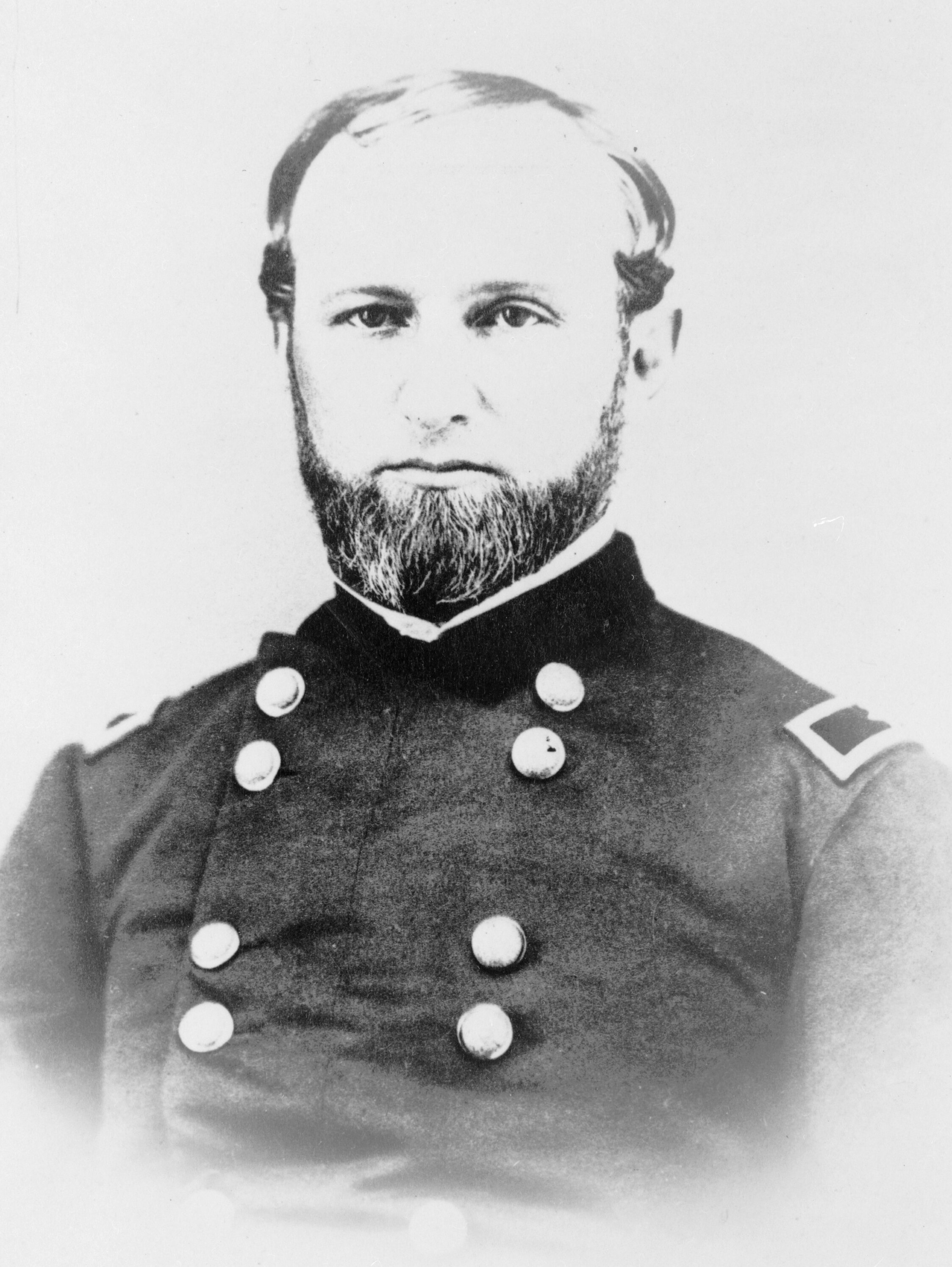
- Born: November 18, 1824; Dover, Tennessee
- Died: May 22, 1868 (aged 43); Springfield, Illinois
- Burial place: Oak Ridge Cemetery, Springfield, Illinois
- Military career
- Allegiance: United States of America; Union
- Branch: United States Army; Union Army
- Service years: 1847 - 1848, 1861 - 1863
- Rank: Colonel; Brigadier General
- Commands: 48th Illinois Volunteer Infantry Regiment
- Conflicts: Mexican–American War; American Civil War: Battle of Fort Donelson; Battle of Shiloh
- Other work: Lawyer, judge

Isham Nicholas Haynie (1824-1868) was a lawyer, politician, soldier and officer in the Union Army during the American Civil War. He was colonel of the 48th Illinois Volunteer Infantry Regiment at the battles of Fort Donelson and Shiloh.

== Early life ==
Haynie was born in Dover, Tennessee, later the site of the Battle of Fort Donelson, which Haynie would take part in. At a young age, he moved to Illinois, where he worked as a farmer before volunteering for service in the Mexican–American War. He was appointed first lieutenant of the Illinois Volunteer Infantry. He was mustered out of volunteer services in 1848. Following the Mexican War, Haynie graduated from Kentucky Law School in 1852. Returning to Illinois, he served as a lawyer and Illinois Legislator. In 1860 Haynie was a presidential elector who voted for Stephen A. Douglas.

== Civil war ==
On November 10, 1861, Haynie was appointed colonel of the 48th Illinois Infantry. Haynie's regiment was attached to the District of Cairo. When Ulysses S. Grant organized his expedition to Fort Henry, Haynie became part of William H. L. Wallace's brigade in John A. McClernand's division. He participated in the capture of Fort Henry.

=== Fort Donelson ===
A week later, Haynie was involved in the investment of Fort Donelson. On February 13, a Confederate battery had been plaguing the Union position. McClernand ordered an assault on the battery despite orders not to bring on a general engagement. McClernand chose his 3rd Brigade under Colonel William R. Morrison to lead the attack. Morrison's brigade consisted of only two regiments, and McClernand decided to temporarily attach Haynie's 48th Illinois to Morrison's brigade. As final preparations were made, Haynie realized he was now the ranking officer in the brigade. Morrison willingly consented, stating it was no time to argue about rank. To that Haynie replied "Colonel, lets take it together." The two colonels led the men forward. Morrison was struck in the hip, taking him off the field and removing any command ambiguity between him and Haynie. The attack failed, and the survivors returned to their lines. Colonel Leonard F. Ross was appointed the new permanent commander of Morrison's brigade, and Haynie returned with his regiment to Wallace's brigade. McClernand and Grant were both eager to forget about the incident, but years later McClernand claimed to Haynie's son he wanted Haynie to lead the charge because he felt him an "abler soldier".

=== Shiloh ===
Following the reorganization of the Union Army following the Battle of Fort Donelson, Haynie remained in command of his regiment, but the brigade was now commanded by Colonel C. Carroll Marsh as W.H.L. Wallace was promoted to division command. During the fighting on April 6 around Shiloh Church, Haynie was struck in the left thigh and forced to turn over command of the regiment.

=== Later service ===
On November 29, 1862, Haynie was appointed Brigadier General of U.S. Volunteers pending the confirmation of the U.S. Senate. Meanwhile, having recovered from his Shiloh wound, he was appointed to command of the 1st Brigade, 3rd Division, XVII Corps. On March 4, 1863, his commission as Brigadier General expired, having never been confirmed by the Senate. Haynie resigned from the army two days later, on March 6.

Returning to Illinois, he served as adjutant general of the Illinois State Militia. Haynie died on May 22, 1868, in Springfield, Illinois.

== See also ==
- William R. Morrison
- Fort Donelson Union order of battle
- Shiloh Union order of battle
