= Kendall Gott =

American military historian

Kendall D. Gott is an Army veteran of Desert Storm, the Senior Historian at the US Army Combat Studies Institute, and author of several works. He is most noted academically as a Civil War and general military history historian, and is a frequent speaker at various Civil War roundtables and staff rides.

== U.S. Army, 1978-2000 ==
Gott enlisted in the US Army and served in Germany with the 3rd Armored Division in Frankfurt as an Intelligence Analyst. He temporarily left the service in 1981, joined ROTC, and attained a BA in history from Western Illinois University in 1983. He returned to the Army and was assigned to Baumholder, Germany as a 2nd Lieutenant in Armor. At the end of this tour Gott reluctantly returned to the Military Intelligence branch after experiencing significant hearing loss. His specialties in that field were Analyst and Counterintelligence.

Gott held a variety of staff and command positions and was stationed stateside at Fort Huachuca, AZ; Picatinny Arsenal, NJ; Fort Polk, LA; Fort Leavenworth, KS; and Fort Gordon, GA. He completed three tours in Germany in Frankfurt, Baumholder, and Nürnberg, and completed a "short tour" at Soto Cano Air Base in Honduras. At Fort Polk he was seriously injured during a parachute jump, with the residual physical effects plaguing him to this day. He earned a Masters of Military Art and Science (MMAS) from the US Army Command and General Staff College in 1998. Gott retired as a Major(Promotable).

His combat experience consists of the Persian Gulf War (Desert Storm) with the 2nd Armored Cavalry Regiment and Operation Desert Fox with the 513th Military Intelligence Brigade.

== Post army 2000-2002 ==
Like many Army retirees, Gott faced challenges in adjusting to civilian life. While living in Martinez, Georgia he worked for a brief time as a defense contractor and as a high school teacher. He was an adjunct professor of history at Augusta State University for four years and concurrently at the Georgia Military College for two years. A break-up of the family precipitated his return to his adopted home state of Kansas.

== Return to Leavenworth, Kansas 2002- ==
After eight months as a contractor with the Battle Command Training Program (BCTP), Gott joined the staff of the Combat Studies Institute (CSI) at Fort Leavenworth as a historian and writer in 2002. He was promoted to Senior Historian in 2006 and served as head of the Research and Publications team. In 2012 he was named an Assistant Adjunct Professor of the Command and General Staff College. Gott completed over half of the coursework towards a PhD from Kansas State University, but his studies are on indefinite hiatus. He served as the Team Chief of the Research and Books team for 15 years until opting for retirement.

== Private life ==
Gott has presented programs with regional Civil War roundtables and has supported a number of staff rides conducted by the Blue and Gray Education Society. He also is very active in supporting the National Park Service at the Fort Donelson National Battlefield Park. He is a Lutheran, and a life member of the Veterans of Foreign Wars the American Legion, and National Eagle Scout Association. Gott earned a private pilot certificate in May 2012. He has two sons, one living in Augusta, Georgia and one in Leavenworth, Kansas. In 2018 Mr. Gott married his high school sweetheart Julia Slane.

== Selected publications and media ==
- Where the South Lost the War: An Analysis of the Fort Henry - Fort Donelson Campaign, February 1862. Stackpole Books, 2003. ISBN 0-8117-0049-6.
- In Glory’s Shadow: The 2nd Armored Cavalry Regiment During the Persian Gulf War, 1990-1991. Special Collections, Combined Arms Research Library, Fort Leavenworth, 1997.
- In Search of an Elusive Enemy: The Victorio Campaign, 1880. CSI Press, 2004.
- Mobility, Vigilance, and Justice: The US Army Constabulary in Germany, 1946-1952. CSI Press, 2005.
- Breaking the Mold: Tanks in the Cities. CSI Press, 2006. ISBN 978-0-16-076223-9
- 16 Cases of Mission Command (contributing author). CSI Press, 2013. ISBN 978-0-9891372-1-8
- Eyewitness to War, The US Army in Operation Al Fajr: An Oral History Volumes 1&2 (general editor). CSI Press 2004. ISBN 0-16-077312-1
- Cultivating Army Leaders: 2010 CSI Symposium Proceedings (general editor). CSI Press. ISBN 978-0-9837226-2-5
- The US Army and the Media: 2009 CSI Symposium Proceedings (general editor). CSI Press. ISBN 978-0-9841901-1-9
- The US Army and the Interagency Process: 2008 CSI Symposium Proceedings (managing editor). CSI Press. ISBN 978-0-9801236-6-1
- Warfare in the Age of Non-State Actors: 2007 CSI Symposium Proceedings (managing editor). CSI Press. ISBN 978-0-9801236-0-9
- Security Assistance: US and International Historical Perspectives: 2006 CSI Symposium Proceedings (managing editor). CSI Press. ISBN 0-16-077346-6
- The Brcko Bridge Riot: Mission Command in the Midst of Ethnic Strife, in Mission Command in the 21st Century: Empowering to Win in a Complex World. The Army Press, 2016. ISBN 978-1-940804-24-8
- Steamboat Seasons and Backwater Battles: A Riverboat Pilot on the Western Rivers in the Civil War, A Historical Novel. Covenant Books, 2019. ISBN 978-164559-373-7
- Ride to Oblivion: The Sterling Price Raid into Missouri, 1864, A Historical Novel. Covenant Books, 2020 ISBN 978-1-64670-205-3
- Steamboat Seasons: Dawn of a New Era Covenant Books, 2020 ISBN 978-1-63630-078-8
- Gone to Kansas: 1856 Covenant Books, 2021. ISBN 978-1-63885-292-6 The audiobook version was nominated for a Grammy in 2022. It came close but did not make the final list of six.
- Gone to Kansas: 1856: Fire and Tribulation Covenant Books, 2023. ISBN 979-8-88644-786-6

Documentaries and Films

- Appeared on the History Channel’s Investigating History: The Battle of Mine Creek.
- Consulted and appeared on the documentary film "Fort Donelson: Gateway to the Confederate Heartland", by Aperture Films. This film is shown hourly at the Fort Donelson Visitors Center.
- He appeared on C-SPAN 3 in March 2012, discussing the 150th anniversary of the Battle of Fort Donelson.
- Consulted and appeared on the documentary film "Unconditional Surrender: The Dover Hotel", by Aperture Films. This film is shown at the historic Dover Hotel in Dover, Tennessee.
