= Bushrod Johnson =

Confederate Army general

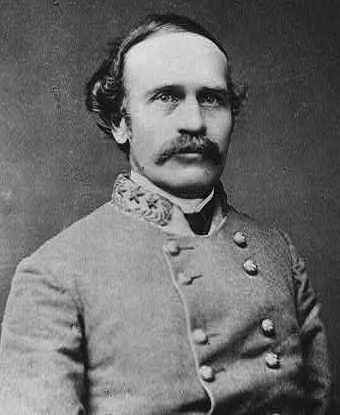
- Bushrod Johnson
- Born: October 7, 1817; Belmont County, Ohio, U.S.
- Died: September 12, 1880 (aged 62); Brighton, Illinois, U.S.
- Burial place: Old City Cemetery; Nashville, Tennessee
- Military career
- Allegiance: United States of America; Confederate States of America
- Branch: United States Army; Confederate States Army
- Service years: 1840–1847 (USA); 1861–1865 (CSA)
- Rank: First Lieutenant (USA); Colonel (Tennessee Militia); Major General (CSA)
- Unit: 3rd U.S. Infantry
- Commands: Fort Donelson; Left Wing, Army of Central Kentucky; Johnson's Brigade; Johnson's Division
- Conflicts: Seminole War Mexican–American War; American Civil War: Battle of Fort Donelson; Battle of Shiloh; Battle of Perryville; Battle of Stones River; Battle of Chickamauga; Siege of Knoxville; Bermuda Hundred Campaign; Battle of Swift Creek; Petersburg Campaign; Battle of the Crater; Siege of Petersburg; Appomattox Campaign; Battle of White Oak Road; Battle of Five Forks; Battle of Sayler's Creek
- Other work: Educator

Bushrod Rust Johnson (October 7, 1817 – September 12, 1880) was a Confederate general in the American Civil War and an officer in the United States Army. As a university professor he had been active in the state militias of Kentucky and Tennessee and on the outbreak of hostilities he sided with the South, despite having been born in the North into a family of abolitionist Quakers. As a divisional commander he managed to evade capture at the Battle of Fort Donelson, but was wounded at the Battle of Shiloh. He served under Robert E. Lee throughout the 10-month Siege of Petersburg, and surrendered with him at Appomattox.

== Early life ==
Johnson was born in Belmont County, Ohio. He was raised as a Quaker and, before moving to the South, worked on the Underground Railroad with his uncle. He graduated from the United States Military Academy in 1840 and was commissioned a second lieutenant in the 3rd U.S. Infantry. He fought in the Seminole War in Florida and the Mexican–American War. He was forced to resign from the Army in October 1847 after being accused of selling contraband goods. He worked as a professor of natural philosophy and chemistry at the Western Military Institute, Georgetown, Kentucky (1848–1849), and professor of mathematics and engineering at the University of Nashville (1849–1861). During this period he was active in the state militias of Kentucky and Tennessee, rising to the rank of colonel. His wife Mary died prior to the war of natural causes, leaving him with a disabled son.

== Civil War ==
Before his wartime service he went north and left his developmentally disabled son in the care of relatives; his son grew up believing that his father was fighting for the Union. After the start of the Civil War, Johnson entered the service June 28, 1861, as a colonel of engineers in the Tennessee Militia, and a week later this commission was changed to be in the Confederate States Army. He approved the locations of two new river-defenses, Fort Donelson on the west bank of the Cumberland River in Tennessee and Fort Henry on the low and flood-prone east bank of the Tennessee River, just 12 miles west of Fort Donelson and also located in Tennessee. Johnson was promoted to brigadier general on January 24, 1862. Fort Henry would turn out to be a disastrous location on swampy ground, often flooded, and easily captured by U.S. Grant. In approving the proposed site for Fort Henry, Johnson overruled vigorous objections to the proposed site from the two members of the Confederate survey team, Adna Anderson, a civil engineer, and Maj. William Foster of the Tennessee 1st Infantry. Just days before the Battle of Fort Donelson he was placed in command of the fort but served in that capacity only briefly as the higher ranking Brig. Gen. Gideon J. Pillow arrived only hours after Johnson assumed command. He commanded a division of the army at Donelson, but was effectively overshadowed by the more politically astute Pillow, who led the wing in a fierce assault in an attempt to break out and escape from the encircled fort. The fort and its army surrendered to Brig. Gen. Ulysses S. Grant on February 16, 1862, but two days later Johnson was able to walk unimpeded out through the porous Union Army lines and escaped capture.

Johnson commanded a brigade of the Army of Mississippi at the Battle of Shiloh, and on the second day of battle, April 7, 1862, he became the division commander, but was severely wounded by the concussion of an artillery shell. For the next year in Braxton Bragg's Army of Tennessee, Johnson's brigade served under a number of divisional commanders of William Hardee's corps: (1) Simon Bolivar Buckner during Bragg's Invasion of Kentucky and its culminating Battle of Perryville; (2) Patrick Cleburne after Bragg's withdrawal back into Tennessee and the Battle of Stones River; and (3) A.P. Stewart during the Battle of Hoover's Gap of the 1863 Tullahoma Campaign.

Thereafter, Bragg withdrew into Georgia. At the Battle of Chickamauga, Johnson's brigade spent September 18 on the Confederate right, assigned to the command of John Bell Hood's division of James Longstreet's corps, then just arriving from Virginia. There, Johnson's men secured Reed's Bridge. On September 19, Longstreet's forces were shifted to the Confederate left and Johnson's men saw minor action against Union forces coming north from the vicinity of Crawfish Springs. The following day, Johnson's men were part of the Confederate push across the Brotherton Field, but were not able to overtake the Union right on Snodgrass Hill. Bragg followed up with a siege of Chattanooga, while Johnson, now commanding a division, accompanied Longstreet's force north for the Siege of Knoxville.

After spending the winter of 1863–64 in northeastern Tennessee, Longstreet's force was transported by rail back to Virginia to reinforce Robert E. Lee for the Overland Campaign. En route, Johnson alone was diverted to Petersburg, to command a division in the Department of North Carolina and Southern Virginia under P. G. T. Beauregard. During the ensuing Bermuda Hundred Campaign, Johnson's division blocked the Union advance toward Petersburg at Swift Creek on May 9. Beauregard defeated the larger Union offensive, and Johnson was promoted to major general on May 21.

During the Siege of Petersburg, the section of the defenses held by Johnson's division was attacked in the Battle of the Crater on July 30. The mine was set off under part of Elliott's South Carolina Brigade, which rallied and captured three stands of colors and 130 prisoners that day. When Beauregard was transferred to the western theater in October, Johnson's division was assigned to Anderson's Fourth Corps in the Army of Northern Virginia under Robert E. Lee.

Johnson's division spent the next seven months of the siege in the trenches. In late March 1865, Johnson's division was withdrawn from the trench line to meet the Union drive around the Confederate right flank, and fought at Lewis's Farm on March 29. On March 31, Johnson led them in a counterattack at White Oak Road. They drove back two Union divisions, but were halted and driven back themselves by Union reinforcements. Two brigades of the division were detached to Pickett at Five Forks, and largely destroyed in that battle on April 1. Johnson led the rest of the division in the retreat toward Appomattox. At Sailor's Creek on April 6, the division was shattered, although Johnson escaped capture. Lee relieved Johnson of command on April 8. He accompanied the army without a command until the surrender at Appomattox Court House, when he was paroled.

== Postbellum life and death ==
Johnson returned to teaching to become a professor and co-chancellor (1870) of the University of Nashville with former Confederate General Edmund Kirby Smith. His health failing, he retired in 1875 to a farm near Brighton, Illinois, where he died in 1880. He was originally buried in Miles Station, near Brighton, but was reinterred in 1975 to Old City Cemetery, Nashville, Tennessee, to be next to the grave of his wife, Mary.

== See also ==
- List of American Civil War Generals (Confederate)
