= 48th Illinois Infantry Regiment =

48th Regiment Illinois Volunteer Infantry
- Illinois state flag
- Active: September, 1861 to August 15, 1865
- Country: United States
- Allegiance: Union
- Branch: Infantry
- Engagements: Capture of Fort Henry; Capture of Fort Donelson; Battle of Shiloh; Siege of Vicksburg; Battle of Resaca; Siege of Atlanta; Battle of Jonesborough; March to the Sea; Battle of Bentonville

The 48th Regiment Illinois Volunteer Infantry was an infantry regiment that served in the Union Army during the American Civil War.

== Service ==
The 48th Illinois Infantry was organized at Camp Butler, Illinois and mustered into Federal service in September, 1861.

The regiment was mustered out on August 15, 1865.

== Total strength and casualties ==
The regiment suffered 10 officers and 113 enlisted men who were killed in action or mortally wounded and 6 officers and 251 enlisted men who died of disease, for a total of 380 fatalities.

== Commanders ==
- Colonel Isham N. Haynie - resigned on November 21, 1862.
- Colonel William W. Sanford - resigned on January 18, 1864.
- Colonel Lucien P. Greathouse - killed in action July 22, 1864.
- Colonel Thomas L. Weens - mustered out with the regiment.

== See also ==
- List of Illinois Civil War Units
- Illinois in the American Civil War
