= Michael Huskey =

United States Navy Medal of Honor recipient

- Born: c. 1841; Ireland
- Died: October 1864 (aged 22–23); Memphis, Tennessee
- Military career
- Allegiance: United States
- Branch: United States Navy
- Rank: Fireman
- Unit: USS Carondelet
- Conflicts: American Civil War
- Awards: Medal of Honor

Michael A. Huskey (c. 1841 – October 1864) was a Union Navy sailor in the American Civil War and a recipient of the United States military's highest decoration, the Medal of Honor.

== Early life and family ==
A native of Ireland, Huskey immigrated to the United States with his family as a child, in 1848 or 1849. The family originally settled in Lockport, New York, and later moved to nearby Royalton. Huskey Cemetery in Royalton is located on the old family farm.

== Military career ==
Huskey joined the U.S. Navy early in the war and worked as a fireman, feeding coal to the boilers aboard steamships. By March 1863, he was serving on the gunboat USS Carondelet, part of the Mississippi River Squadron, conducting operations in support of the campaign to capture Vicksburg, Mississippi. During Steele's Bayou Expedition in mid-March, the Carondelet was among a group of Union ships which attempted to bypass Vicksburg and reach the Yazoo River from the Mississippi by steaming through Steele's Bayou. The ships became stuck in the bayou's narrow channel and came under fire from Confederate soldiers on shore. In an effort to trap the ships, the Confederates began chopping down trees such that they fell across the channel. During the engagement, the tugboat USS Ivy, which carried the commanding Union admiral, became stuck. Despite the Confederate fire, Huskey volunteered for a rescue party which successfully freed the Ivy. Union troops led by General William T. Sherman cleared the Confederate soldiers from the area, but the bayou proved impassable and the ships were forced to turn back.

For his actions during the expedition, he was approved for the Medal of Honor a year later, on April 16, 1864. Only months later, in October 1864, Huskey died of illness at a hospital in Memphis, Tennessee. He had neither claimed nor received his Medal of Honor before his death; it is unclear whether he was ever aware of the award. Huskey's place of burial is unknown. According to Niagara County historian Catherine Emerson, he was most likely among the "unknowns" buried in Memphis National Cemetery, presumably after authorities lost track of his identity.

== Unclaimed medal ==
Officials from Niagara County in New York submitted a request to the Department of the Navy to receive the unclaimed Medal of Honor for Huskey. The Navy denied the request, stating a lack of security in the building the county wanted to display the medal as well as the cost of creating the medal. The navy did however send county officials an embossed letter regarding his Medal of Honor which they called "an embarrassment". Although county officials were not happy with the outcome, they will display the latter in a display being dedicated in October if the medal is not available.

== Medal of Honor citation ==
Fireman Huskey's official Medal of Honor citation reads:

Carrying out his duties gallantly, Huskey volunteered to aid in the rescue of the tug Ivy under the fire of the enemy, and set forth general meritorious conduct during this hazardous mission.

== See also ==
- List of Medal of Honor recipients
