= Neosho-class monitor =

United States Navy's Neosho-class ironclad river monitors

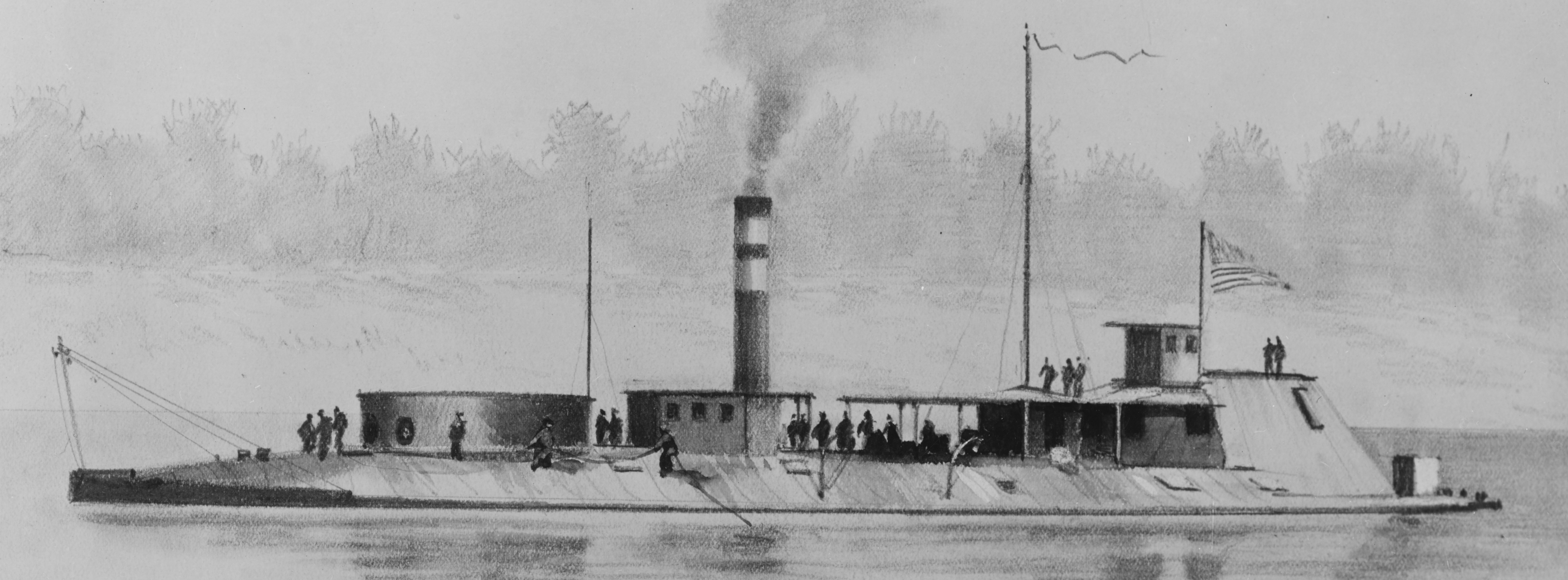
- A drawing of Neosho as she appeared in 1863

Class overview
- Name: Neosho class
- Builders: Union Iron Works, Carondelet, Missouri
- Operators: United States Navy
- Built: 1862–1863
- In service: 1863–1873
- Completed: 2
- Retired: 2

General characteristics
- Type: River monitor
- Tons burthen: 523
- Length: 180 ft (54.9 m)
- Beam: 45 ft (13.7 m)
- Draft: 4 ft 6 in (1.4 m)
- Depth of hold: 9 ft (2.7 m)
- Installed power: 400 ihp (300 kW); 4 × boilers
- Propulsion: 1 × horizontal steam engine; stern wheel-propelled
- Speed: 12 miles per hour (19 km/h)
- Complement: 100 officers and men
- Armament: 2 × 11-inch (280 mm) smoothbore Dahlgren guns
- Armor: Gun turret: 6 in (152.4 mm); Hull: 2.5 in (64 mm); Deck: 1.25 in (32 mm)

The Neosho-class monitors were a pair of ironclad river monitors laid down in mid-1862 for the United States Navy during the American Civil War. After completion in mid-1863, both ships spent time patrolling the Mississippi River against Confederate raids and ambushes as part of Rear Admiral David Porter's Mississippi Squadron. Both ships participated in the Red River Campaign in March–May 1864, although Osage supported the capture of Fort DeRussy in March and participated in the Battle of Blair's Landing in April. Osage was grounded on a sandbar for six months after the end of the campaign while Neosho resumed her patrols on the Mississippi. The latter ship supported the Union Army's operations on the Cumberland River and provided fire support during the Battle of Nashville in December.

Osage, after being refloated and repaired, was transferred to the West Gulf Blockading Squadron in early 1865 for the campaign against Mobile, Alabama. During the Battle of Spanish Fort in March 1865 she struck a mine and rapidly sank. The ship was later salvaged and sold in 1867. Neosho was decommissioned after the war and remained in reserve until sold in 1873.

== Design and description ==
The original plans for the Neosho-class ships, designed by James Eads, resembled the City-class ironclads with a draft of 5 feet 6 inches (1.7 m), but the successful performance of the Monitor during the Battle of Hampton Roads caused the navy to revise its requirement to include a gun turret. Eads responded with an impressive design that included a turret with 8 inches (203 mm) of armor, a fully armored sternwheel and a draft of 4 feet 6 inches (1.4 m), but the navy wanted even less draft and rejected his design. Eads adopted a turtleback deck design that promised to only draw 3 feet 6 inches (1.1 m).

The steam-powered turret was at the bow and they had a deckhouse between the funnel and the sternwheel, although another was later added between the turret and the funnel. The Neosho-class ships were 180 feet (54.9 m) long overall and had a beam of 45 feet (13.7 m). When launched, they proved to have a draft 1 foot (0.3 m) deeper than planned and they measured 523 tons burthen. The ships had four steam boilers powering one two-cylinder, western steamboat-type engine that drove the sternwheel. The Neosho-class ships had a maximum speed of 12 miles per hour (19 km/h) in service and they carried 50 long tons (51 t) of coal.

The ships' main armament consisted of two smoothbore 11-inch (279 mm) Dahlgren guns mounted in a single turret that had an arc of fire of 300°. Firing the guns tended to jam the turret until modifications were made to the guns' recoil system. Each gun weighed approximately 16,000 pounds (7,300 kg). They could fire a 136-pound (61.7 kg) shell up to a range of 3,650 yards (3,340 m) at an elevation of 15°. The turret and the pilothouse were protected by 6 inches (152 mm) of wrought iron while the hull had 2.5 inches (64 mm) of armor. The deck's armor plates were 1.25 inches (32 mm) thick.

== Ships ==
Construction data
Name	Builder	Laid down	Launched	Commissioned
Neosho	Union Iron Works, Carondelet, Missouri	mid-1862	13 February 1863	13 May 1863
Osage	Union Iron Works, Carondelet, Missouri	mid-1862	13 January 1863	10 July 1863

== Service history ==
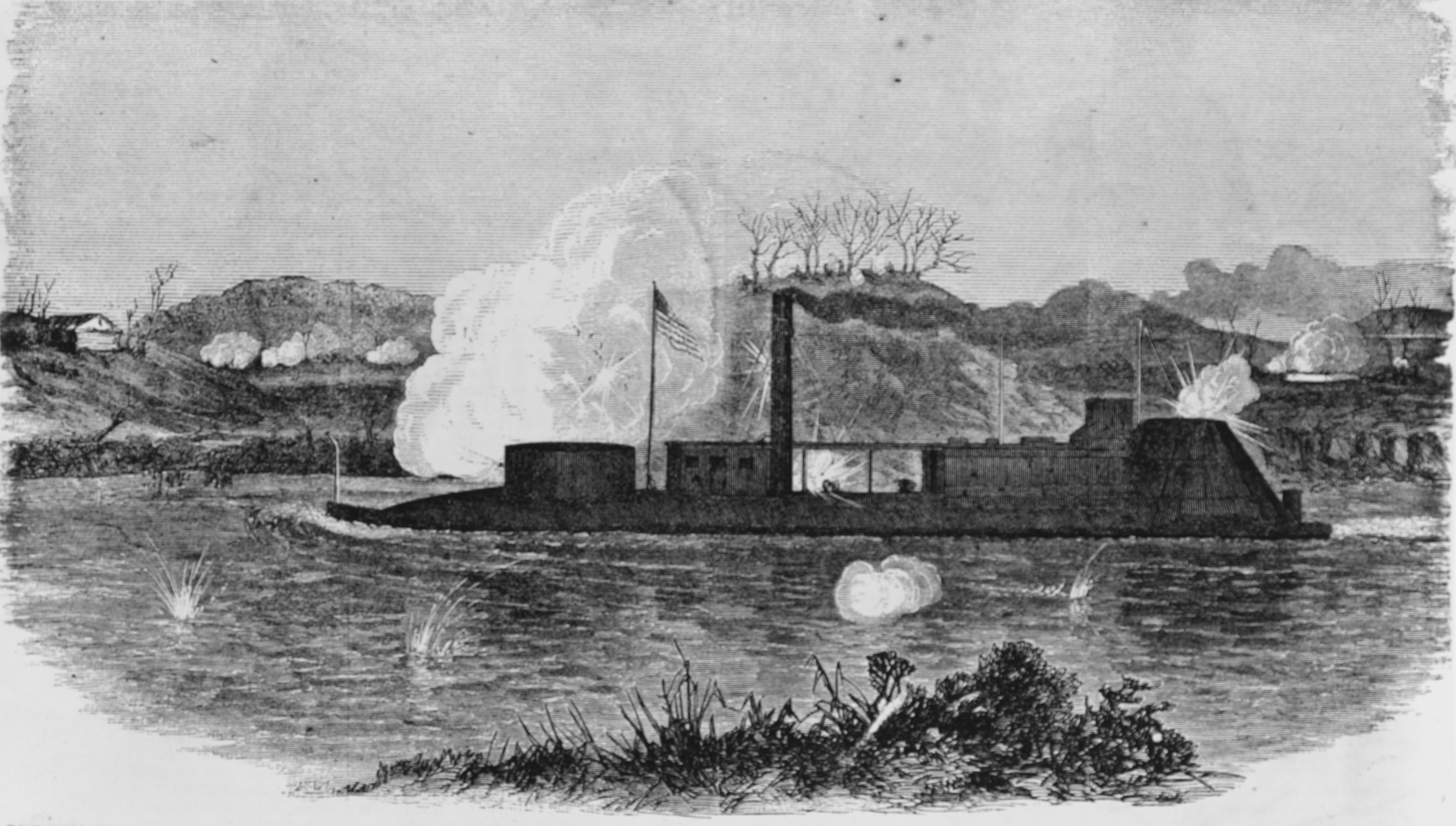
Neosho engaging Confederate artillery on the Cumberland, below Nashville, 6 December 1864

Neosho was commissioned at Cairo, Illinois on 13 May 1863, but was not completed until 1 July. She left Cairo on 14 July 1863 and reached Vicksburg on 6 August, just over a month after it had surrendered after a lengthy siege. Neosho and other warships patrolled the Mississippi and its tributaries to prevent Confederate raiders and flying batteries from ambushing Union supply ships. One example was on 8 December 1863 when "a Confederate shore battery attacked and disabled merchant steamer Henry Von Phul; Neosho and Signal steamed up to defend the ship and silenced the battery."

From 12 March to 22 May 1864, Neosho and Osage participated in the unsuccessful Red River Campaign under the command of Rear Admiral David Porter. During the retreat down the Red River, Neosho was trapped above the falls at Alexandria, Louisiana, along with most of the other ironclads of the Mississippi Squadron, when the river's water level unexpectedly began to fall. Two temporary dams, known as Bailey's Dam, had to be built in April–May to raise the water level high enough to allow the ironclads to proceed downstream. During the Franklin-Nashville Campaign in December 1864 Neosho, accompanied by the casemate ironclad Carondelet, bombarded Confederate artillery batteries on the Cumberland River, near Bell's Mills, Tennessee, on 6 December. Despite being hit over 100 times, she was not seriously damaged. The monitor bombarded the Confederate right wing during the Battle of Nashville on 15–16 December.

Neosho was decommissioned at Mound City, Illinois on 23 July 1865 and remained in ordinary. She was renamed Vixen 15 June 1869 and again renamed Osceola on 2 August 1869. The monitor was sold at Mound City to David Campbell 17 August 1873 for $13,600.

During the Red River Campaign Osage was commanded by Lieutenant Commander Thomas O. Selfridge Jr. She participated in the capture of Fort DeRussy on 14 March 1864, shortly after the beginning of the campaign. She successfully defended the navy transports attacked during the Battle of Blair's Landing on 12 April, driving off the Confederate forces with heavy losses. After the end of the campaign in May she was assigned to patrol the Mississippi River. During that month she grounded on a sandbar near Helena, Arkansas and could not be refloated even when some of her armor was removed due to the rapidly falling water level. As the water receded Osage began to hog at the ends because only her middle was supported by the sand. This caused her longitudinal bulkheads to split and broke many rivets in her hull and on her deck. She was repaired in place before being refloated at the end of November.

After being towed to Mound City for more permanent repairs, Osage was transferred to the West Gulf Blockading Squadron on 1 February 1865 for the attack on Mobile, Alabama. She participated in the Battle of Spanish Fort, defending Mobile from the east, but struck a mine in a previously swept channel and sank rapidly on 29 March. Two crewmen were killed and some others wounded. The ship was later refloated and sold at auction at New Orleans 22 November 1867, along with three ex-Confederate ships, for $20,467.

== See also ==
- List of ironclads
