= USS Mound City =

Civil War gunboat

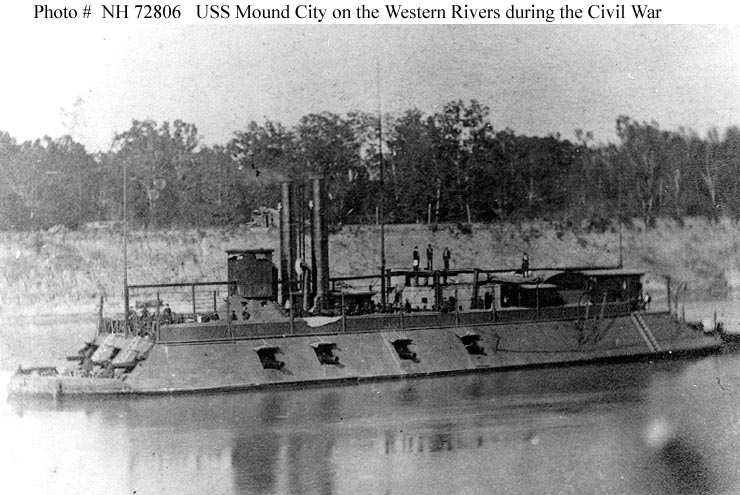
- USS Mound City, circa 1864-65

History

United States
- Name: USS Mound City
- Namesake: Mound City, Illinois
- Launched: October 1861
- Commissioned: 16 January 1862
- Fate: Scrapped 9 November 1865

General characteristics
- Displacement: 512 long tons (520 t)
- Length: 175 ft (53 m)
- Beam: 51 ft (16 m)
- Draft: 6 ft (1.8 m)
- Propulsion: Steam-driven sternwheel
- Speed: 9 knots (17 km/h; 10 mph)
- Complement: 251
- Armament: (see section below)
- Armor: Casemate:2.5 in (64 mm); Pilothouse: 1.25 in (32 mm)

USS Mound City was a City-class ironclad gunboat built for service on the Mississippi River and its tributaries in the American Civil War. Originally commissioned as part of the Union Army's Western Gunboat Flotilla, she remained in that service until October 1862. Then the flotilla was transferred to the Navy and she became part of the Mississippi River Squadron, where she remained until the end of the war.

While with the Western Gunboat Flotilla, Mound City took part in combat at Island No. 10, at Fort Pillow, and in an expedition on the White River in Arkansas. At Fort Pillow, she was rammed by Confederate vessels of the River Defense Fleet and averted sinking only by retreating into shoals. On the White River during the Battle of Saint Charles, a chance Confederate shot penetrated the steam drum of her engines, resulting in 105 of her sailors being killed. An additional forty-five crew members were reported wounded, primarily by scalding. The ship suffered only minor damage.

After being transferred to the Navy's Mississippi River Squadron, she served in the Vicksburg campaign. Among her activities there were participation in the Steele's Bayou Expedition and the later bombardment of the batteries at Grand Gulf, Mississippi. Following the capture of Vicksburg and consequent opening of the Mississippi, she took part in the ill-fated Red River Expedition, from which she and the other ships were rescued only with difficulty.

With the end of hostilities, she was decommissioned and sold to private parties.

== Design and construction ==
Mound City was one of seven gunboats built under contract for the Union Army by industrialist and inventor James B. Eads. The boats were collectively known by various names: Eads gunboats, City-class ironclads, or Cairo-class (after the lead vessel) gunboats. Unofficially and more commonly, they were referred to as "Pook turtles", in reference to both their peculiar shape and the man who was most responsible for their design. The initial specifications were drawn up by Eads, Commander John Rodgers of the US Navy, and the US Army's Quartermaster-General Montgomery C. Meigs. Chief of the Bureau of Construction and Repair John Lenthall provided some initial plans, but the pressure of other duties soon forced him to turn the task over to Samuel Moore Pook. Most of the final design was created by Pook, with some modifications by Flag Officer Andrew H. Foote. The engines were designed by A. Thomas Merritt.

Pook's design was constrained by the requirement that the vessel be armored. It would also have to operate on the shallow waters of the interior. Together, these meant that the hull had to be made quite broad, in order to support the weight of the armor. Faced with the limitations of the technology of the day, Pook decided that the hull should be built with three keels, the outboard pair somewhat longer than the one on the centerline. Propulsion would be provided by a single paddlewheel, immediately aft of the center keel; perhaps unintentionally, this meant that it would be somewhat protected from enemy projectiles by the armor carried along the sides.

The contract for constructing the seven gunboats was awarded to Eads and was signed on 7 August 1861. It called for the boats to be completed by 10 October, with penalties for failure to meet schedule. The cost was projected to be $89,600 per boat. Four of the seven were built in shipyards near St. Louis, while the remaining three, including Mound City, were built by Hambleton, Collier and Company at Mound City, Illinois, a short distance above Cairo on the Ohio river. Because of design changes during construction, the boats were not completed until nearly the end of the year, and the cost per vessel, $191,408, was more than double the contracted amount.

Mound City had two engines, one driving each side of the paddlewheel, mounted 90 degrees apart. Each engine had a single cylinder of bore 22 inches (0.56 m) and stroke 6 feet (1.8 m). These were able to drive her at a maximum speed of 8 knots (15 km/h). The engines for the class were built by Hartupee and Company of Pittsburgh, Eagle Foundry of St. Louis, or Fulton Foundry, also of St. Louis. The steam drums were at first mounted so low that the engines worked with water rather than steam, so the drums had to be moved to the top of the boilers. In their new position, they were not protected by the extra armor that was given to the engines.

As completed, Mound City displaced 512 tons. She was 175 feet (53 m) in length, 51 feet 2 inches (15.60 m) in beam, and drew 6 feet (1.8 m).

== Armor ==
According to the original plans, Mound City would have been protected by a casemate of iron 2.5 inches (64 mm) thick. The armor would have been pierced for 20 guns of various calibers and weights. Pook did not give specific instructions for the placement of the armor, however, so that problem had to be settled by Commander Rodgers. He insisted on greater thickness on the forward face of the casemate, and also that the pilot house, wheelhouse, and main deck be given some cover. In all, his modifications increased the weight of the armor to 122 tons, half again as much as Pook had intended. To compensate for the extra weight, the number of guns had to be reduced from 20 to only 13: three firing forward, four on each side, and two facing astern.

When she was delivered, she was found to be stern-heavy. By this time, Rodgers had been replaced in command of the Western Gunboat Flotilla by Captain Andrew H. Foote, who directed the final modifications. Foote reduced the armor at the stern. As a result, she was vulnerable to enemy fire from astern, as well as to plunging fire.

== Armament ==
Like many of the Mississippi theater ironclads, Mound City had her armament changed multiple times. To expedite the entrance of Mound City into service, she and the other City-class ships were fitted with whatever weapons were available, then had their weapons upgraded as new pieces became available. Though the 8-inch (200 mm) smoothbore guns were fairly modern, most of the other original armaments were antiquated, such as the 32-pounders, or modified, such as the 42-pounder "rifles" that were in fact old smoothbores that had been gouged out to give them rifling. These modified weapons were of particular concern to military commanders because they were structurally weaker and more prone to exploding than purpose-built rifled guns. Additionally, the close confines of riverine combat greatly increased the threat of boarding parties. The 12-pounder howitzer was equipped to address that concern and was not used in regular combat.

Ordnance characteristics
January 1862	Mid 1863	Early 1864
• 3 × D. 8-inch smoothbores • 4 × J. 42-pounder rifles • 6 × D. 32-pounder rifles • 1 × D. 12-pounder rifle	• 3 × D. 8-inch smoothbores • 1 × D. 50-pounder rifle • 2 × J. 42-pounder rifles • 6 × D. 32-pounder rifles • 1 × P. 30-pounder rifle • 1 × D. 12-pounder rifle	• 3 × D. 8-inch smoothbores • 4 × D. 9-inch smoothbores • 1 × P. 100-pounder rifle • 1 × D. 50-pounder rifle • 3 × D. 32-pounder rifles • 1 × P. 30-pounder rifle • 1 × D. 12-pounder rifle

== Service ==
=== Island No. 10 ===
Mound City was completed and delivered to the Western Gunboat Flotilla in early 1862, with Commander Augustus H. Kilty, USN as her captain. Although the flotilla was officially a part of the Army and their crews were enlisted in that service, their officers were supplied by the Navy. Mound City was not used at the battles of Fort Henry and Fort Donelson, so her first action was at Island No. 10. In the siege that preceded the surrender of the island by the Confederate garrison, the gunboats bombarded the island on 18 March. Other than that, they had little to do, as most of the action consisted of bombardment by the group of mortar rafts that were a part of the flotilla. However, an army raiding party, assisted by several crew members from Mound City and four other gunboats, successfully overran a Confederate battery on the night of 1 April and spiked the guns. This was preliminary to the run by USS Carondelet and Pittsburg that was key to the Union victory. In the aftermath of the Confederate surrender, Mound City captured the Rebel steamer CSS Red Rover, which had been used for accommodating the crew of the floating battery New Orleans. A copy of the Confederate Navy signals was captured with Red Rover; these were delivered to Washington, from where they were made available to the entire US Navy.

=== Plum Point Bend ===
Following the capture of Island No. 10, the next Federal objective on the Mississippi was Fort Pillow, upstream of and defending Memphis, Tennessee. Rather than assault the fort, Major General Henry Wager Halleck, commanding the Army west of the Appalachians, had moved into the interior of the states of Tennessee and Mississippi. Consequently, the struggle for Fort Pillow was reduced to a mortar bombardment like that at Island No. 10. However, the Confederate forces were augmented by eight cottonclad rams of the River Defense Fleet, and these surprised the bombarding mortar boat and its single accompanying gunboat Cincinnati on the morning of 10 May 1862. Mound City was with other gunboats at anchor a short distance upstream when the sounds of battle were heard, and she promptly got up steam and was the first to come to the aid of the vessels already involved in the fray. Because the Union ships entered the fight one at a time, the Rebels were able to concentrate on each in its turn. Cincinnati had already been rammed several times and was out action, fleeing to shallow water to avoid sinking. With no other support, Mound City was rammed by CSS Earl Van Dorn. The blow was so severe that her bow was almost wrenched off. She, like Cincinnati, had to seek refuge in shoals where the deep-draft rams could not follow. By this time, several other Federal gunboats had gotten up steam and were entering the battle, so Confederate commander James E. Montgomery withdrew his fleet.

Both Cincinnati and Mound City were raised and restored to the flotilla, although neither was repaired soon enough to take part in the First Battle of Memphis on 6 June.

=== White River expedition ===
About this time, the Union Army of the Southwest under Major General Samuel R. Curtis had been operating in the interior of Arkansas. Curtis believed that Confederate forces of the Trans-Mississippi Department were gathering to attack him. Fearing that he would be cut off, he requested that communications be established between his army and that on the Mississippi River. Either the Arkansas River or the White River would have served his purposes, but the Arkansas was too low for water transport, so an expedition was sent up the White River with intent to give Curtis the aid he had asked for. A single regiment, the 46th Indiana Volunteers, embarked in army transports; they were accompanied by two armored gunboats, Mound City and St. Louis, two unarmored gunboats, and an armed tug. On 13 June, the expedition entered the White River and proceeded uneventfully upstream for four more days.

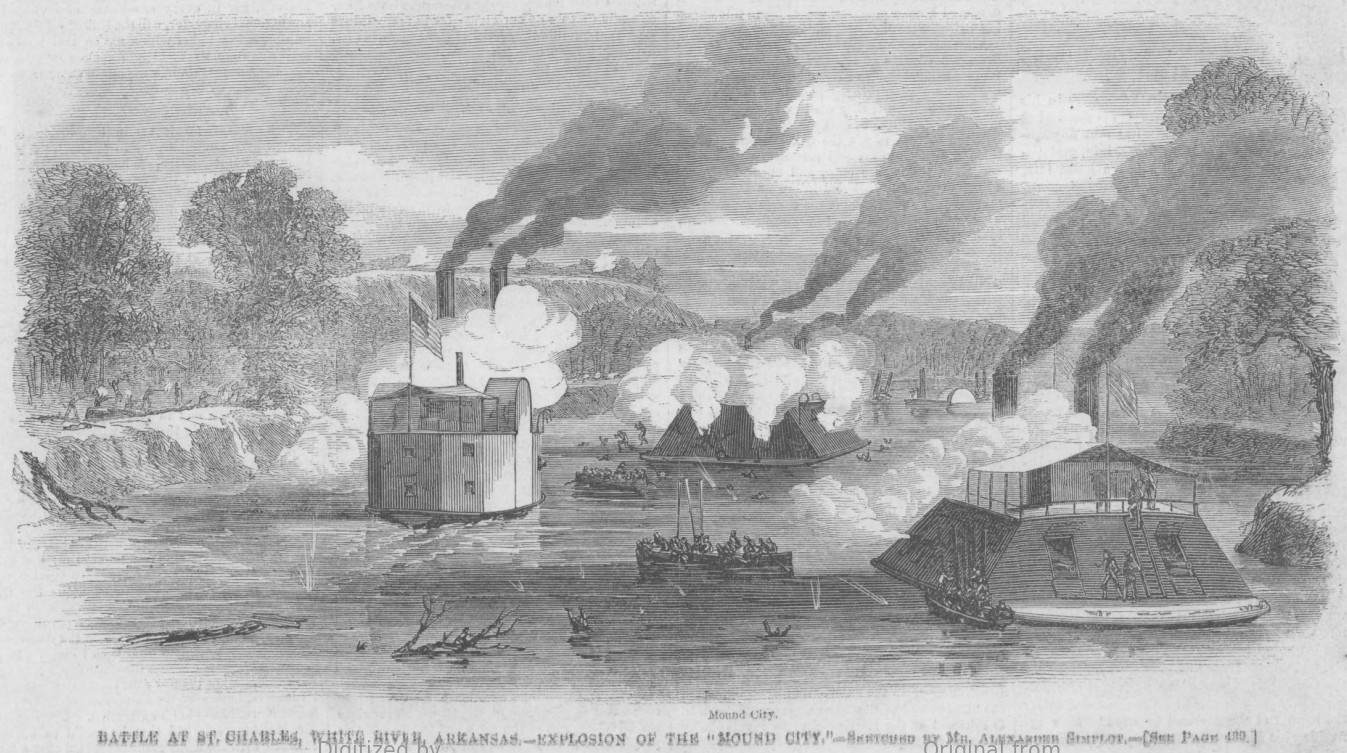
The Battle at St. Charles, White River, Arkansas—Explosion of the "Mound City" by Alexander Simplot

With intent only to slow down the progress of the Union vessels and not to make a determined stand, the Confederates had set up a pair of batteries on the bluffs near St. Charles, Arkansas, some 80 miles (130 km) above the river mouth. The guns were taken from a gunboat which they had then scuttled in the middle of the stream as a further impediment. On 17 June, the Federal flotilla arrived at that point; the soldiers went ashore to attack the batteries from the land side, while the two armored gunboats came up the river, Mound City leading. Shots were exchanged between the gunboats and the shore batteries, with nothing exceptional until a chance shot from the upper battery happened to penetrate the casemate of the lead gunboat. The shot killed some men in its passage, but most of the damage it caused occurred when it hit the vessel's steam drum. Hot steam immediately filled the entire boat, killing and scalding most of the crew. Those who could do so jumped overboard into the river, where Rebel sharpshooters shot them as they tried to swim to safety. By the time the carnage was over, 105 men were dead by the first shot, scalding, drowning, or being shot in the water. An additional 25 were injured by the steam. Among the wounded was Commander Kilty, who survived and later returned to service in the Navy, although he lost his left arm. Only 25 men of the entire crew escaped without major injury. Meanwhile, the soldiers had moved into position to assault the batteries, so the Confederates fled, leaving their wounded and their guns behind.

Despite the almost complete loss of her crew, Mound City had suffered only inconsequential damage that could soon be repaired. First Master John A. Duble of the gunboat Conestoga took temporary command in place of Commander Kilty. Replacements for the crew were taken from other vessels in the expedition, and they went on for another 65 miles (105 km). They then turned back without meeting the Army of the Southwest. Soon enough Curtis was able to move his army to Helena, Arkansas, where he was able to reestablish his communications without the support of the Gunboat Flotilla.

=== Steele's Bayou expedition ===
The Western Gunboat Flotilla was transferred from War Department to Navy Department control on 1 October 1862. It was reconstituted as the Mississippi River Squadron, with (Acting) Rear Admiral David Dixon Porter in command. Porter was ordered to cooperate with Major General Ulysses S. Grant's Department of the Tennessee. Relations between the commanding general and the fleet actually improved at this time, despite the altered chain of command.

Shortly after the transfer, Grant began his campaign to capture Vicksburg and open the Mississippi River. After the initial failure of his traditional overland approach, he devised several plans aimed at bypassing the fixed defenses of the city. One of these became known as the Steele's Bayou Expedition. Mound City, now commanded by Lieutenant Commander Byron Wilson, was a member of a flotilla that attempted to reach the Yazoo River through a web of bayous, sloughs, creeks, and rivers. Porter himself accompanied the expedition and made the important decisions. Progress was slow because of the tight turns in the narrow streams, the trees that overhung the channels, and willow roots that clung to the hulls of the vessels as they attempted to pass; they were brought to a complete halt by Confederate soldiers who felled trees in the intended path. Unable to dislodge the enemy, Porter ordered a retreat, but then found that a party of Rebels had circled behind him and were cutting him off. Porter sent an immediate appeal for help to Grant, and then had his subordinates prepare to destroy their vessels rather than let them fall into enemy hands. The appeal was passed on to Major General William T. Sherman, commanding the Fifteenth Army Corps and already in the vicinity. He ordered two of his regiments forward immediately, and they met up with Porter's flotilla on the afternoon of 21 March. Sherman himself accompanied a larger body of troops that arrived in the enemy's rear the next day. The surprised Confederate soldiers immediately fled. Although the expedition was no longer opposed by the Rebels, Porter and Sherman concluded that nothing would be gained by resuming the advance. Accordingly, the retreat continued, and the flotilla was back on the Mississippi on 27 March.

=== Grand Gulf ===
After the failure of the overland movements against Vicksburg, Grant decided to bypass the city on the Mississippi and attack it from the south. Porter strongly urged that the army be supported by a major part of his fleet, and Grant immediately accepted his suggestion. Mound City was one of eight gunboats, three army transports, and a tug that ran past the river batteries at Vicksburg and Grand Gulf on the night of 16 April 1863. She was struck five times by enemy shot, and four of her crew were wounded, with no fatalities. The gunboats then were in position to assist the Army of the Tennessee, which already had marched down the west bank of the Mississippi to New Carthage, Louisiana, roughly halfway between Vicksburg and Grand Gulf on the other side of the river.

Grant initially intended to cross the river at Grand Gulf, but the two Confederate batteries there would have to be eliminated before his soldiers could go ashore. Porter's gunboats attempted to do this on 29 April. Mound City and three of her sisters were assigned the task of reducing the lower battery, known as Fort Wade. Once this was accomplished, the four gunboats moved upstream to join three other members of the Mississippi River Squadron in the bombardment of the upper battery, Fort Cobun. The latter, being more favorably sited on high ground, could not be put out of action. One man was killed on Mound City, the only casualty the ship suffered during the gunfight. At the end of the day, Fort Cobun had only a single gun still operational, but it was sufficient to cause Grant to decide not to make his river crossing at Grand Gulf. He continued down the river and made an unopposed landing at Bruinsburg, Mississippi.

=== Red River expedition ===
Following the opening of the Mississippi that followed the capture of Vicksburg, Mound City had mostly small-scale operations to perform. The only exception was the Red River Expedition, described by one historian as the "largest combined [i.e. joint] operation to that point in U.S. military history, it was also one of the war's major military fiascoes." Most of the Mississippi River Squadron were involved, but little naval action transpired. The most memorable incident concerning the Navy was the near-stranding of several of the ironclads owing to low water in the Red River. The operation had already been canceled and the fleet was in retreat down the river when Mound City, two of her sisters, three other ironclads, and two tugs were almost trapped at rapids above Alexandria, Louisiana. They were saved only by an impressive engineering feat, the construction of wing dams to raise the water level high enough that the vessels could pass through. The man responsible for building the dams was Lieutenant Colonel Joseph Bailey, whom Admiral Porter credited with saving a fleet worth nearly $2,000,000.

== Decommissioned ==
The Mississippi River Squadron was rapidly eliminated after the end of hostilities. Mound City was already being stripped at the end of July 1865, and on 2 August she was out of commission. She was sold to private interests in November.

== See also ==
- Anaconda Plan

== Bibliography ==
- Gibbons, Tony, Warships and naval battles of the Civil War. Dragon's World, Ltd., 1989. U.S. ed., Gallery books, 1989. ISBN 0-8317-9301-5
- Joiner, Gary D., Mr. Lincoln's brown water navy : the Mississippi Squadron. Rowman & Littlefield Publishers, 2007. ISBN 978-0-7425-5097-1
- Konstam, Angus, New Vanguard 56, Union River Ironclad 1861-65, Osprey Publishing, 2002. ISBN 978-1-84176-444-3
- Milligan, John D., Gunboats down the Mississippi. Annapolis, U.S. Naval Institute, 1965.
- Tucker, Spencer, Blue & gray navies : the Civil War afloat. Annapolis, Md. : Naval Institute Press, 2006.
- (ORN) Official records of the Union and Confederate Navies in the War of the Rebellion. Series I: 27 volumes. Series II: 3 volumes. Washington: Government Printing Office, 1894–1922.
