= Woon (surname) =

Woon is a surname with various origins. It is a word in the old Cornish language, meaning 'downlander', and remains a common name in Cornwall. It is also one possible spelling of the Minnan pronunciation of the Chinese surname romanized in Mandarin pinyin as Wen (溫).

People with the Chinese surname Woon (溫) include:

- Woon Sui Kut (1929–2013), Singaporean sports official
- Woon Swee Oan (born 1954), Malaysian writer
- Woon Tai Ho (born 1958), Singaporean journalist
- Walter Woon (born 1956), Attorney General of Singapore
- Woon Khe Wei (born 1989), Malaysian badminton player

Other people with the surname Woon include:

- John Woon (1823–?), U.S. Navy sailor during the American Civil War
- Basil Woon (1893–1974), British-born American writer
- Peter Woon (1931–2014), British journalist
- Andy Woon (born 1952), British football forward
- Jamie Woon (born 1983), British singer
