= Matthew Arther =

- Civil War era Navy Medal of Honor
- Born: c. 1835; Scotland
- Died: 17 March 1890 (aged 54–55); San Francisco, California
- Burial place: San Francisco National Cemetery
- Military career
- Allegiance: United States
- Branch: United States Navy
- Service years: 1861 - 1863
- Rank: Signal Quartermaster
- Unit: USS Carondelet
- Conflicts: American Civil War • Battle of Fort Henry • Battle of Fort Donelson
- Awards: Medal of Honor

Matthew Arther (or Arthur) (c. 1835—1890) was a Union Navy sailor in the American Civil War and a recipient of the U.S. military's highest decoration, the Medal of Honor, for his actions at the Battles of Fort Henry and Fort Donelson.

== Biography ==
Arther was born in about 1835 in Scotland, and joined the US Navy from Boston, Massachusetts in August 1861. He served during the Civil War as a signal quartermaster on the USS Carondelet. During the Battles of Fort Henry and Fort Donelson in February 1862, he performed his duties as signal quartermaster and captain of the ship's bow gun "faithfully, effectively and valiantly". For these actions, he was awarded the Medal of Honor the next year, on July 10, 1863, and was discharged from the Navy two weeks later.

Arther's official Medal of Honor citation reads:

Served on board the U.S.S. Carondelet at the reduction of Forts Henry and Donelson, 6 and 14 February 1862 and other actions. Carrying out his duties as signal quartermaster and captain of the rifled bow gun, S/Q.M. Arther was conspicuous for valor and devotion, serving most faithfully, effectively and valiantly.

== See also ==
- List of American Civil War Medal of Honor recipients: A-F
