= John Henry Dorman =

American Civil War Medal of Honor recipient

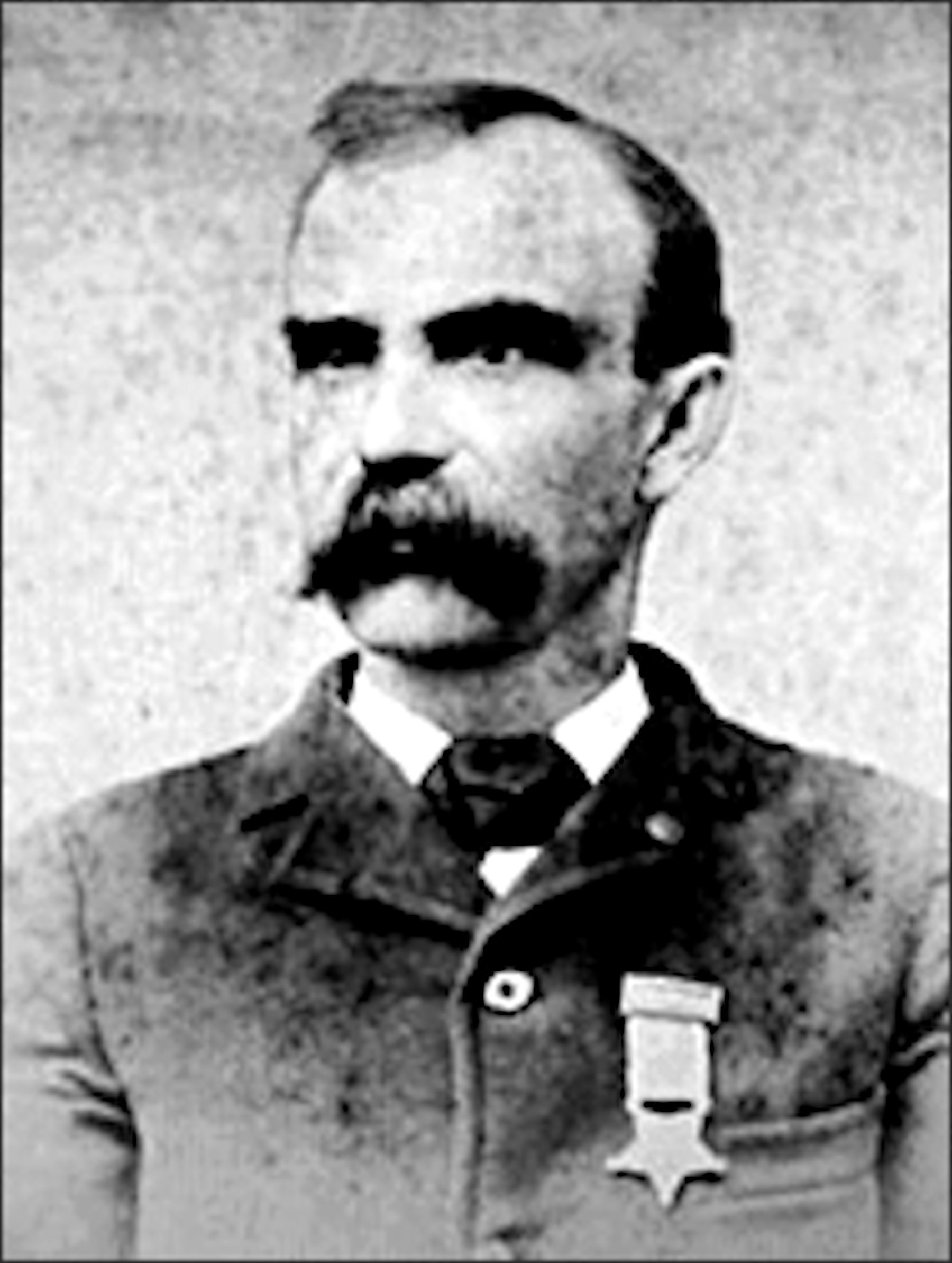
- Dorman in 1880
- Born: September 18, 1843; Cincinnati, Ohio
- Died: May 29, 1921 (aged 77); Cincinnati, Ohio
- Burial place: Spring Grove Cemetery
- Military career
- Allegiance: United States of America
- Branch: United States Navy
- Rank: Seaman
- Unit: (Ohio) U.S. Navy
- Conflicts: Battle of Fort Henry; Siege of Vicksburg
- Awards: Medal of Honor

Seaman John Henry Dorman (September 18, 1843 to May 29, 1921) was an American sailor who fought in the American Civil War. Dorman received the country's highest award for bravery during combat, the Medal of Honor, for his action aboard the USS Carondelet during the Battle of Fort Henry on 6 February 1862 and during the Siege of Vicksburg on 22 May 1863. He was honored with the award on 18 April 1864.

== Biography ==
Dorman was born in Cincinnati, Ohio on 18 September 1843. He enlisted into the United States Navy. He died on 29 May 1921 and his remains are interred at the Spring Grove Cemetery in Cincinnati, Ohio.

== Medal of Honor citation ==
Carrying out his duties courageously throughout the actions of the Carondelet, Dorman, although wounded several times invariably returned to duty and constantly presented an example of devotion to the flag.

== See also ==
- List of American Civil War Medal of Honor recipients: A–F
