= Steele's Bayou expedition =

Action of the American Civil War

- Part of the American Civil War
- Operations against Vicksburg and Grant's Bayou Operations. Confederate Union
Date	March 14–27, 1863
Location	Northwestern Mississippi
Result	Confederate victory

Belligerents
United States (Union)	(Confederate States of America) CSA (Confederacy)

Commanders and leaders
Rear Admiral David D. Porter, USN; Major General William T. Sherman, USA	Colonel Winfield S. Featherston, CSA

Strength
5 gunboats 4 mortar rafts 2 brigades	1 brigade (2,500 men)

The Steele's Bayou expedition was a joint operation of Major General Ulysses S. Grant's Army of the Tennessee and Rear Admiral David D. Porter's Mississippi River Squadron, conducted as a part of the Vicksburg campaign of the American Civil War. Its aim was to move Union forces from the Mississippi River to a point on the Yazoo River upstream of Confederate Lieutenant General John C. Pemberton's defenses of Vicksburg. To avoid enemy artillery in place on the bluffs to the east of the city, the expedition would leave the Yazoo and proceed indirectly on a route through a series of waterways in the flood plain to the east of the Mississippi.

The army and navy contingents of the expedition moved separately, although their movements were coordinated. The naval flotilla moved into Steele's Bayou on March 14, 1863. Two army transports followed them on the opening leg; others were to come later if the route were to prove satisfactory. Traversing Steele's Bayou was not particularly difficult, but the second leg, along Deer Creek, proved impossible. The waterway, narrow and with frequent turns, forced the vessels to move at snail's pace. Exploiting this, the Rebels further impeded progress by felling trees across the stream, and brought the Union force to a halt within 1.5 miles (2.4 km) of the Rolling Fork. The flotilla would have retreated, but Confederate troops got in their rear on Deer Creek and began felling trees there also.

With his vessels effectively trapped, Porter sent an urgent appeal for help to the Army, and then issued orders to his captains to prepare to destroy their ships rather than let them fall into enemy hands. The soldiers, with the personal prodding of Major General William T. Sherman, made a forced march that got to the flotilla on March 22. They easily drove off the Confederate patrols that were blocking the retreat, so Porter and his vessels were able to move back into Steele's Bayou. By March 27, the entire expedition was back on the Mississippi, having accomplished nothing.

The Steele's Bayou expedition was Grant's last attempt to attack Pemberton's right flank. Following its failure, he turned his attention to the enemy left flank, and soon began the movement that led to the capture of Vicksburg.

== Background ==
The campaign to capture the Confederate stronghold at Vicksburg, Mississippi, the last major obstacle to Union control of the Mississippi River, had bogged down in the winter of 1862–1863. The Union's Major General Ulysses S. Grant had put into motion several operations aiming at flanking Confederate Lieutenant General John C. Pemberton's fixed defenses. Grant wanted to keep his troops busy until he could begin active campaigning later in the spring, so he ordered them to undertake several moves that would give the appearance of activity but would not bring on a major battle. Writing in his memoirs long after the event, he stated that he did not have great confidence that any of them would prove successful, although he was prepared to take advantage of them if they did. Not only had the operations failed to produce any good results, but the last, the joint Army–Navy operation known as the Yazoo Pass expedition, was in danger of being captured or destroyed before it could extricate itself from enemy territory. Grant and Acting Rear Admiral David D. Porter therefore set one more operation in motion. Like the others, it was an effort to get on the enemy flank; it had the additional purpose of relieving some of the pressure on the earlier expedition. To avoid the lethargy in command that had hampered the Yazoo Pass operation, Porter himself went with the gunboats, and the Army was under the personal direction of Major General William T. Sherman.

Grant's orders to Sherman lay out the course of the expedition. They also show that he was not completely sure of its success. "You will proceed as early as practicable up Steele's Bayou and through Black Bayou to Deer Creek, and thence with the gunboats now there, by any route they may take, to get into the Yazoo River for the purpose of determining the feasibility of getting an army through that route to the east bank of that river, and at a point at which they can act advantageously against Vicksburg."

=== Geography ===
Steele's Bayou ran roughly parallel to the Mississippi, as seen on this map of the area produced shortly after the war

The expedition was very much limited by the geography of the Mississippi Delta, the flood plain of the river occupying most of northwestern Mississippi. The land is quite low and is in fact lower in many places than the river. The region is characterized by numerous marshes, brakes, sloughs, bayous, lakes, creeks, and rivers that in the geologic past were parts of the river bed. Until the middle of the nineteenth century, overflow from the Mississippi continued to pass into these waters, and they could be used as alternatives to the main river for water transportation. When railroads provided more convenient commerce, however, levees to contain the flow had been built, and the land was partially drained. Then, when the war came, the levee was breached for the Yazoo Pass expedition, and the land was again flooded. Minor waterways swelled to the size of small rivers, raising the possibility that Union gunboats could travel on them. Porter believed that he could send his gunboats and army transports up Steele's Bayou (present-day Steele Bayou) to Black Bayou, into Deer Creek, then Rolling Fork, and finally into the (Big) Sunflower River. The last met the Yazoo River a short distance upstream from the bluffs where a major Union attack had been repulsed in late 1862.

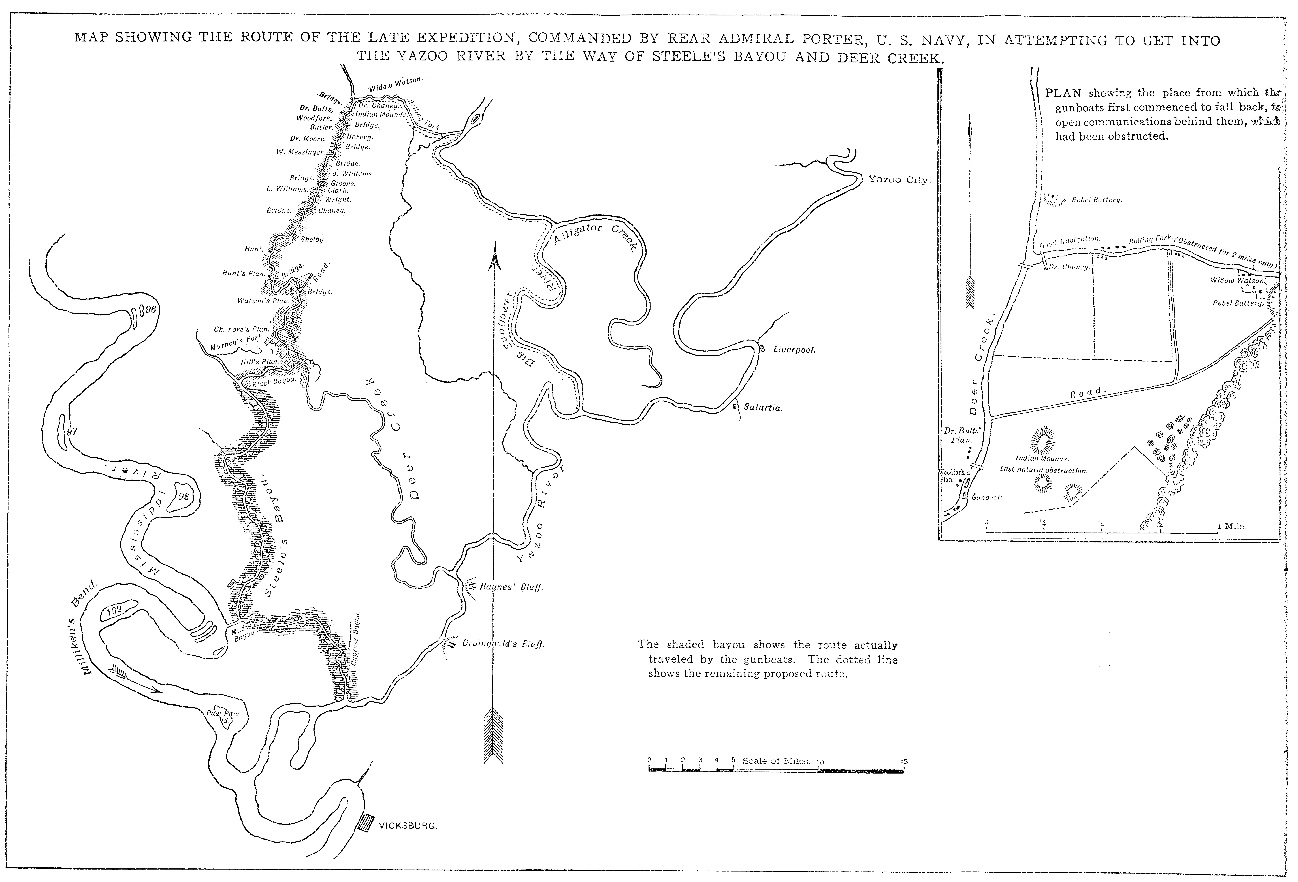
Route followed by the Steele's Bayou expedition.

Porter had to rely on imperfect maps and the advice of local citizens who did not understand the difficulties of moving heavy warships in a narrow channel with numerous bends. He was therefore unprepared for the problems presented by Deer Creek. There the straight-line distance between the entry point at Black Bayou and the exit at Rolling Fork, 13 miles (21 km), was only half the distance along the creek, 26 miles (42 km). He was also unaware of the impedance to mobility imposed by the overhanging trees that grew down to the water's edge and by the submerged vegetation that seized the hulls of his vessels. When encountered, these problems limited progress of the gunboats to as little as 1 mile (1.6 km) every two hours.

== Start of the expedition and Confederate response ==
The expedition entered Steele's Bayou on March 14. The naval contingent was spearheaded by five Pook turtles, USS Louisville, Cincinnati, Carondelet, Mound City, and Pittsburg. Four tugs pulling mortar rafts added to the firepower. In addition, soldiers in two Army transports followed the flotilla. General Sherman himself was with the troops. The gunboats got through Steele's Bayou and Black Bayou by the end of the second day, and there Sherman overtook them. He saw that the overgrowth would be a serious obstacle; while the armored gunboats could push aside the limbs in their path, the smokestacks and upper works of the flimsier transports would be severely battered. Nevertheless, Porter decided to push on, and Sherman returned to bring up the rest of his soldiers.

Meanwhile, the Confederate Army was not idle. Major General Carter L. Stevenson, who commanded the Confederate district, was aware of the growing threat to Vicksburg almost as soon as the expedition cleared Steele's Bayou. He had his division commander Major General Dabney H. Maury order Brigadier General Winfield S. Featherston to take his brigade to the Rolling Fork–Deer Creek juncture. The order was intercepted by Brigadier General Stephen D. Lee, who decided on his own to reinforce Featherston's brigade with one of his own regiments.

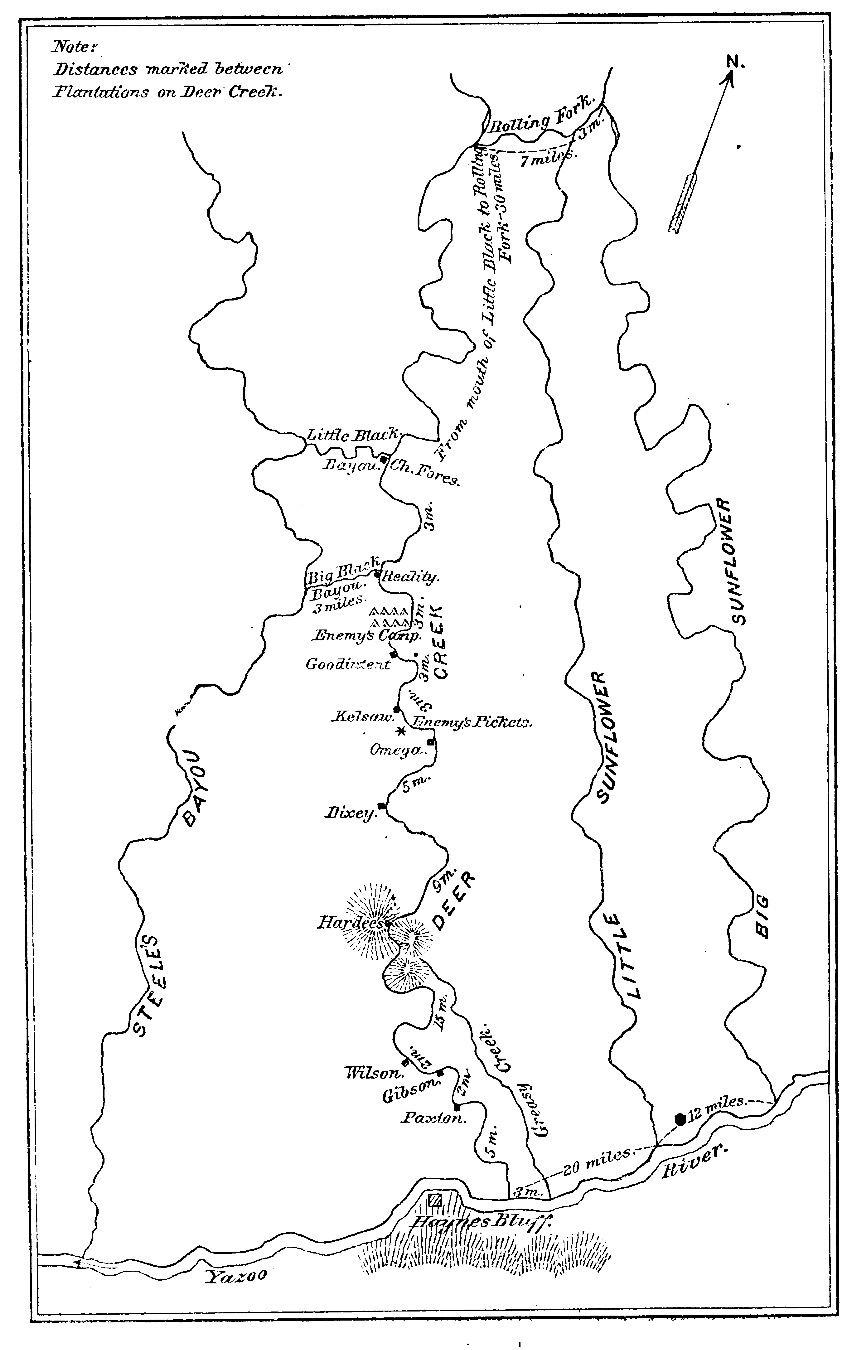
Map included with report of General Dill (CSA), referencing points he mentioned in the report. Compare the irregular path of Deer Creek shown here with the smoother path shown in Porter's map.

By March 20 Confederate troops began to arrive at the Rolling Fork and the upper end of Deer Creek. The earliest Rebel troops to arrive were those of Lee, a battalion of infantry, six field pieces of artillery, and 40 to 50 cavalry, all led by Lieutenant Colonel Samuel W. Ferguson. They had been at Fort Pemberton, the most serious impediment to the Yazoo Pass expedition. The removal of Ferguson's men gave the Federal commander there, Brigadier General Isaac F. Quinby, a good chance to take the fort, but Quinby remained unaware of his advantage. The opportunity to satisfy that part of Grant's strategy was missed.

The Rebel soldiers began by felling trees across Deer Creek, further impeding the progress of the flotilla. Porter sent some 300 of his sailors ashore under Lieutenant Commander John M. Murphy with orders to clear away the opposition. They occupied a small Indian mound that dominated the field and were for a time able to drive the enemy away, and the gunboats managed to crawl forward to within 0.5 miles (0.80 km) of the Rolling Fork. There they skirmished with Ferguson's force until the light failed, and the Union shore party retired to the protection of the armor of their vessels.

Ferguson renewed the attack the next day, March 21. Ferguson put his soldiers again to work obstructing the stream. Porter realized that he was blocked, so he began to reverse his course back down Deer Creek. About the time the ships began to move, however, a plantation slave brought word that some of the Confederate troops had slipped around the flotilla and were felling trees in their rear. The report was confirmed by (Union) Colonel Giles Smith of the 8th Missouri Infantry, who had come up Deer Creek and had counted more than forty large trees lying across the stream. Smith's regiment was welcome protection, but they were not strong enough to drive the enemy off.

== Sherman's army comes ==
Porter now had to consider the possibility that his vessels would be trapped. Although they were in no immediate danger, the Rebels could starve him out. He sent a message to Sherman outlining his predicament and urging him to hasten to the rescue. Meanwhile, preparing for the worst, he ordered his captains to be ready to destroy their ships rather than let them fall into enemy hands.

The remaining Union soldiers were still at the head of Black Bayou, not yet having entered Deer Creek. They had encountered unexpected difficulties in moving from the Mississippi across Steele's Bayou, and consequently they were still more than 20 miles (32 km) by land from the flotilla. When Sherman heard the noise of battle, he put his troops into motion. After a forced march of a day and a half, they arrived just as the Confederates were mounting an attack on the 8th Missouri. Taken in the rear, the Rebels withdrew, and the sailors greeted their savior enthusiastically. Porter now had adequate Army support to be completely out of danger, so the retreat continued. Aside from minor rear guard action, the expedition was over. By March 27, the flotilla was back in the Mississippi, where they awaited the next move that Porter and Grant had in store for them.

== Aftermath ==
With the collapse of the Steele's Bayou expedition, Grant had lost his last chance to attack the Confederate right flank. Porter, together with most others, thought that the Union forces should pull back to Memphis to regroup and consider what to do next. Grant, however, had no such inclination, and he turned to the prospect of attacking the Confederate left. Porter unhesitatingly accepted Grant's position, and he immediately began to advise the general how best to incorporate the Navy into his plans. The ensuing close working arrangement between the two men became an important part of the rest of the Vicksburg campaign.

Porter's easy acquiescence in the plans of the commanding general is an indication of his military maturity. In the view of his biographer Chester Hearn, the failure of the Steele's Bayou expedition at an earlier time in his career would likely have resulted in recriminations against his subordinates, superiors, and colleagues. As it happened, however, he recognized that all the others had given their best. He also saw that success was most likely to be achieved if the Army and Navy were to collaborate fully. Seen in this light, the expedition is more than simply a failed operation; it was a necessary prelude to final victory.

== Site coordinates ==
- Entrance to Steele's Bayou 32°26.9′N 90°53.5′W
- Deer Creek–Rolling Fork junction 32°54.4′N 90°52.7′W
