= USS Pittsburgh (1861) =

Gunboat of the United States Navy

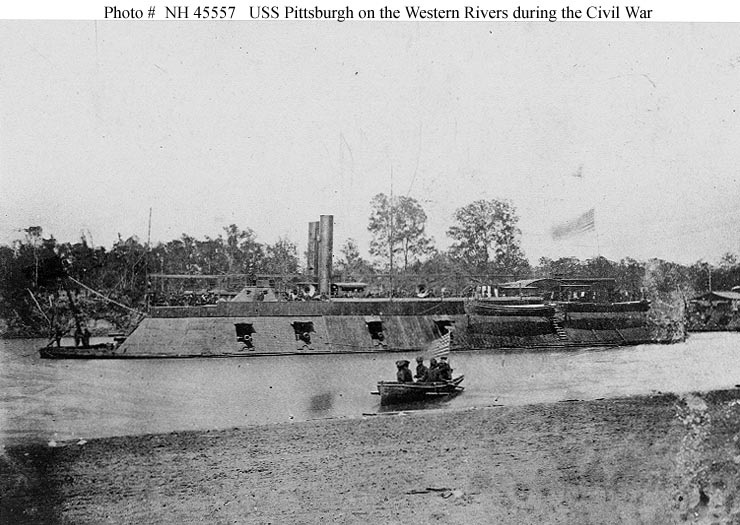
- USS Pittsburgh

History

United States
- Namesake: The City of Pittsburgh
- Launched: October 1861
- Commissioned: 25 January 1862
- Fate: Sold for scrap, 29 November 1865

General characteristics
- Displacement: 512 tons
- Length: 175 ft (53 m)
- Beam: 51 ft 6 in (15.70 m)
- Draft: 6 ft (1.8 m)
- Propulsion: Stern wheeler
- Complement: 251
- Armament: (see section below)
- Armor: Casemate: 2.5 in (64 mm); Pilothouse: 1.25 in (32 mm)

USS Pittsburgh (often Pittsburg) was a City-class ironclad gunboat constructed for the Union Army by James B. Eads during the American Civil War, and transferred to the Union Navy in October 1862. She was commissioned in January 1862, Commander Egbert Thompson in command.

== Operational history ==
Joining Flag Officer Andrew Hull Foote's Western Gunboat Flotilla in river patrol duty, Pittsburgh attacked Fort Donelson February 14, 1862, and was damaged by counter-fire. The support from the gunboats contributed greatly to the capture of the strategic fort two days later.

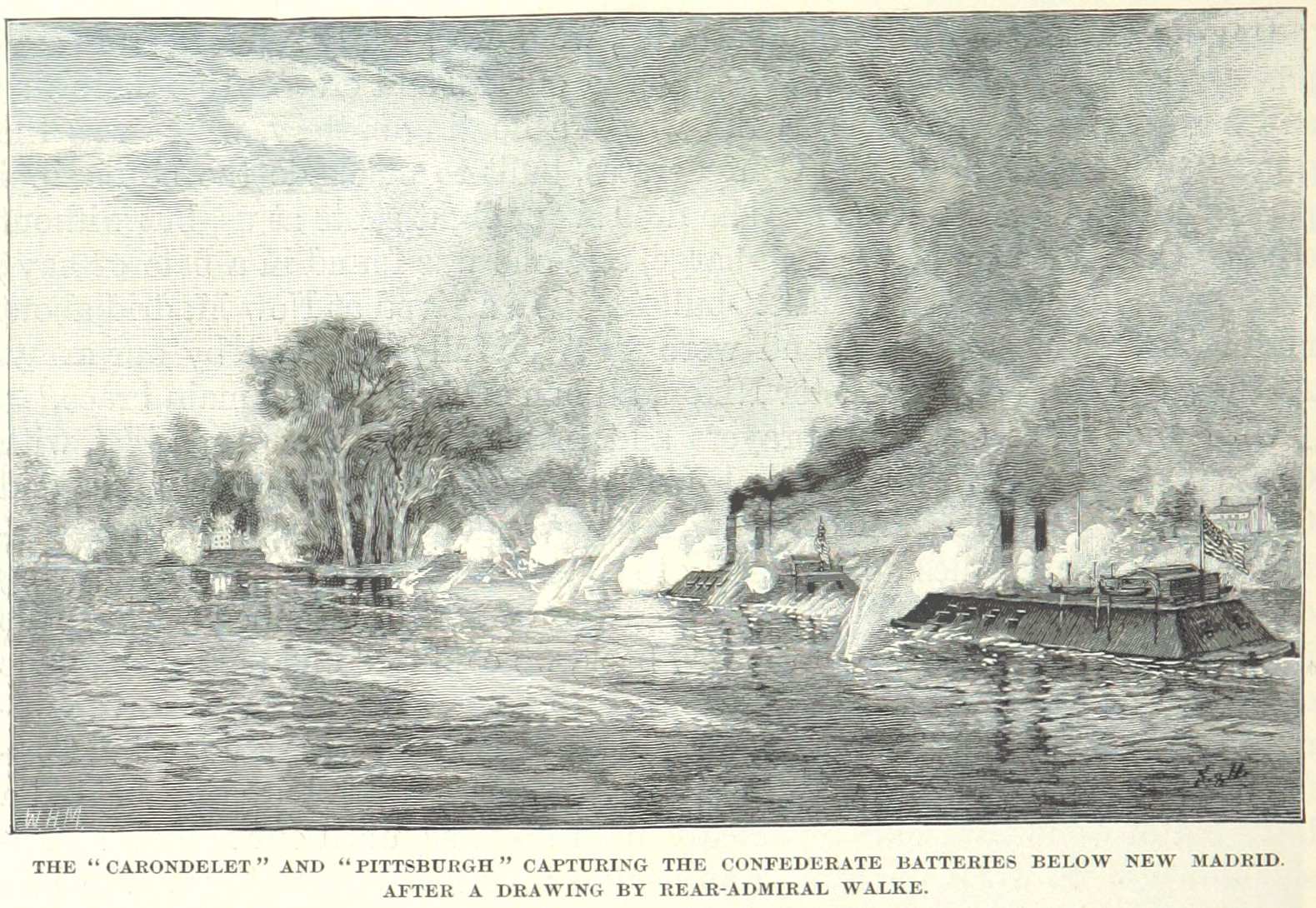
Pittsburgh and Carondelet destroy Confederate batteries below New Madrid

Repaired, she attacked Island No. 10 on April 3, then ran its batteries by dark April 7, being lashed by a heavy thunderstorm as well as the island's 73 guns. This daring feat made it possible for her and Carondelet to demolish batteries below New Madrid, Missouri that same day, clearing the way for the Army to cross the Mississippi River.

Pittsburgh gave continued service in the lengthy series of operations which wrested control of the lower Mississippi from the Confederacy. Her flotilla, previously under Army control, came under naval command October 1, 1862. Lieutenant Commander William R. Hoel USN took command of the Pittsburgh at this time. Highlights of her service were the operations against Plum Point Bend, Fort Pillow and Memphis in April, May and June 1862; the Steele's Bayou Expedition of March 1863; and the passing of the Vicksburg batteries April 16, 1863. She led the attack on the batteries at Grand Gulf on April 29 and was heavily damaged during the five-and-a-half-hour engagement. One of Pittsburgh's sailors, Boatswain's Mate John Woon, was awarded the Medal of Honor for his part in the battle. The action at Grand Gulf secured Union control of an important stretch of the river, making it possible for Grant to cross the river and attack Vicksburg from the rear. The strong Confederate river fortress surrendered July 4, allowing President Abraham Lincoln at last to report, "The Father of Waters flows unvexed to the sea."

Patrol and bombardment missions on the Mississippi were interrupted the following year when Pittsburgh joined in the Red River Expedition from March to May 1864. On March 1, 1865, Hoel was detached from Pittsburgh, to take command of USS Vindicator; Acting Master Morgan commanded Pittsburgh until her decommissioning at Mound City, Illinois at close of the war. Pittsburgh was sold there November 29, 1865.

== Armament ==
Like many of the Mississippi theater ironclads, Pittsburgh had its armament changed multiple times over life of the vessel. To expedite the entrance of Pittsburgh into service, she and the other City-class ships were fitted with whatever weapons were available; then had their weapons upgraded as new pieces became available. Though the 8 in (200 mm) Dahlgren smoothbore cannons were fairly modern most of the other original armaments were antiquated; such as the 32-pounders, or modified; such as the 42-pounder "rifles" which were in fact, old smoothbores that had been gouged out to give them rifling. These 42-pounder weapons were of particular concern to military commanders because they were structurally weaker and more prone to exploding than purpose-built rifled cannons. Additionally, the close confines of riverine combat greatly increased the threat of boarding parties. The 12-pounder howitzer was equipped to address that concern and was not used in regular combat.

Ordnance characteristics
January 1862	May 1863	December 1863	September 1864
• 3 × 8-inch smoothbores • 2 × 42-pounder rifles • 6 × 32-pounder rifles • 2 × 30-pounder rifles • 1 × 12-pounder smoothbore	• 2 × 9-inch smoothbores • 3 × 8-inch smoothbores • 2 × 42-pounder rifles • 4 × 32-pounder rifles • 2 × 30-pounder rifles • 1 × 12-pounder smoothbore	• 2 × 9-inch smoothbores • 2 × 9-inch rifles • 2 × 8-inch smoothbores • 1 × 100-pounder rifle • 4 × 32-pounder rifles • 2 × 30-pounder rifles • 1 × 12-pounder smoothbore	• 2 × 9-inch smoothbores • 2 × 9-inch rifles • 2 × 8-inch smoothbores • 1 × 100-pounder rifle • 2 × 32-pounder rifles • 2 × 30-pounder rifles • 1 × 12-pounder smoothbore

== See also ==
- Anaconda Plan
