= John Woon =

Medal of Honor recipient

- Born: c. 1823; England
- Military career
- Allegiance: United States
- Branch: United States Navy
- Rank: Boatswain's mate
- Unit: USS Pittsburgh
- Conflicts: American Civil War • Battle of Grand Gulf
- Awards: Medal of Honor

John Woon (born c. 1823, date of death unknown) was a Union Navy sailor in the American Civil War and a recipient of the U.S. military's highest decoration, the Medal of Honor, for his actions during the Battle of Grand Gulf.

Born in about 1823 in England, Woon immigrated to the United States and was living in New York when he joined the U.S. Navy. He served during the Civil War as a boatswain's mate and gun captain on the USS Pittsburgh. At the Battle of Grand Gulf, Mississippi, on April 29, 1863, he "had been confined to his hammock several days from sickness, yet insisted on and took command of the gun of which he was captain; fought it for over two hours, and only left it when no longer able to stand". For this action, he was awarded the Medal of Honor a few months later on July 10, 1863.

Woon's official Medal of Honor citation reads:

Serving on board the U.S.S. Pittsburg, [sic] Mississippi River, 29 April 1863. Engaging the enemy batteries at Grand Gulf, the U.S.S. Pittsburg, although severely damaged and suffering many personnel casualties, continued to fire her batteries until ordered to withdraw. Taking part in a similar action after nightfall, the U.S.S. Pittsburg received further damage, but receiving no personnel casualties in the latter action. Woon showed courage and devotion to duty throughout these bitter engagements.
