= City-class ironclad =

Mississippi River gunboat of the Americans civil war

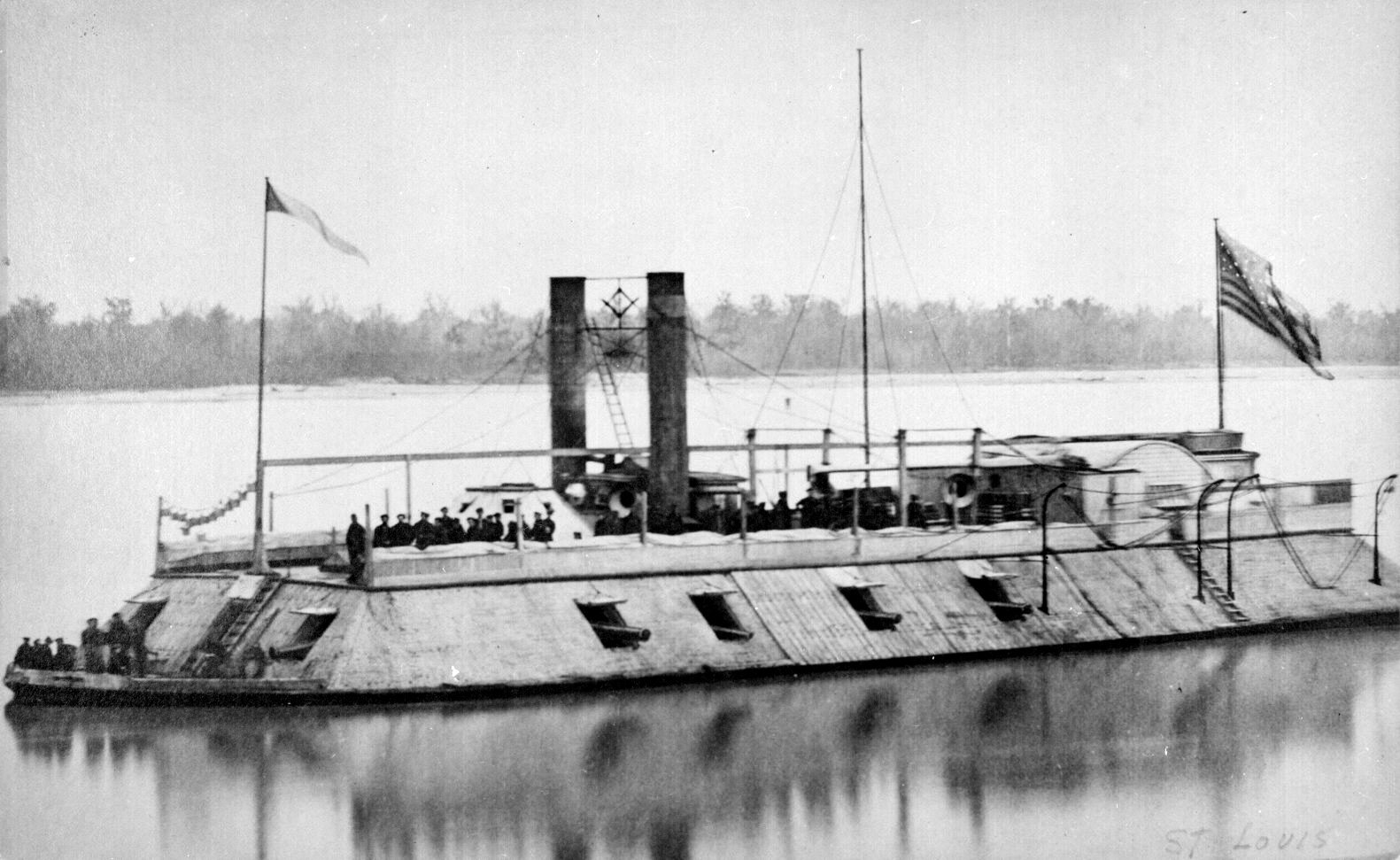
- USS Baron DeKalb in 1862

Class overview
- Name: City class
- Builders: James B. Eads, St. Louis, Missouri
- Operators: U.S. Army, until October 1, 1862; thereafter U.S. Navy
- Cost: $191,000, approximate average
- Lost: 2
- Retired: 5
- Preserved: 1

General characteristics
- Type: Gunboat
- Displacement: 512 tons
- Length: 175 ft (53 m)
- Beam: 51 ft 2 in (15.60 m)
- Draft: 6 ft (1.8 m)
- Installed power: two non-condensing reciprocating steam engines
- Propulsion: 22 ft (6.7 m) diameter paddle wheel
- Speed: 8 knots (15 km/h; 9.2 mph)
- Complement: 251
- Armament: 3 × 8 in (203 mm), 4 × 43-pounder (19 kg), 6 × 32-pounder (14.5 kg) (January 1862)
- Armor: 2.5 in (64 mm) on casemate, 1.5 in (38 mm) on pilot house; hull, deck, and stern unprotected

The Pook Turtles, or City-class gunboats to use their semi-official name, were war vessels intended for service on the Mississippi River during the American Civil War. They were also sometimes referred to as "Eads gunboats." The labels are applied to seven vessels of uniform design built from the keel up in Carondelet, Missouri shipyards owned by James Buchanan Eads. Eads was a wealthy St. Louis industrialist who risked his fortune in support of the Union.

The City-class gunboats were the United States' first ironclad warships. (Note: Because the City-class gunboats were built using War Department funds, when commissioned they were United States Army property. Because of this, the USS Monitor, commissioned over a month after the first of the City-class vessels, has the honor of being the United States Navy's first ironclad.)

The gunboats produced by Eads formed the core of the United States Army's Western Gunboat Flotilla, (Note: The Western Gunboat Flotilla was a unique "joint service" organization. The gunboats were built using funds from the War Department, were manned by Navy personnel, and were under the ultimate command of the U.S. Army theater commander.) which later was transferred to the US Navy and became the Mississippi River Squadron. Eads gunboats took part in almost every significant action on the upper Mississippi and its tributaries from their first offensive use at the Battle of Fort Henry until the end of the war. (Note: The major exception is the Battle of Shiloh; the two gunboats there had been built and converted in other shipyards.)

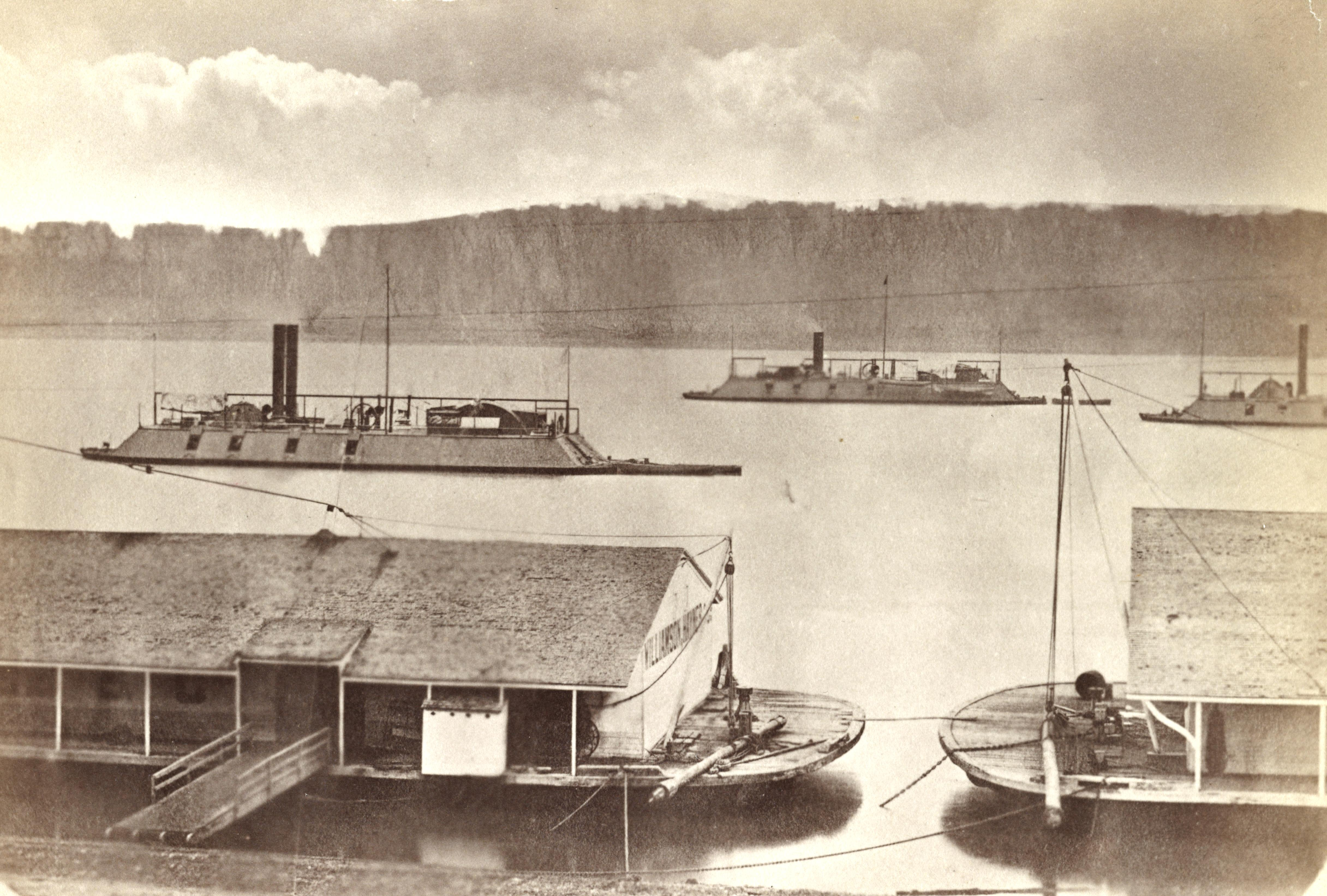
City-class ironclads in Illinois

== Early connection between Eads and the US government ==
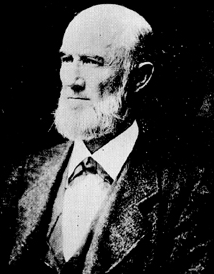
James Buchanan Eads

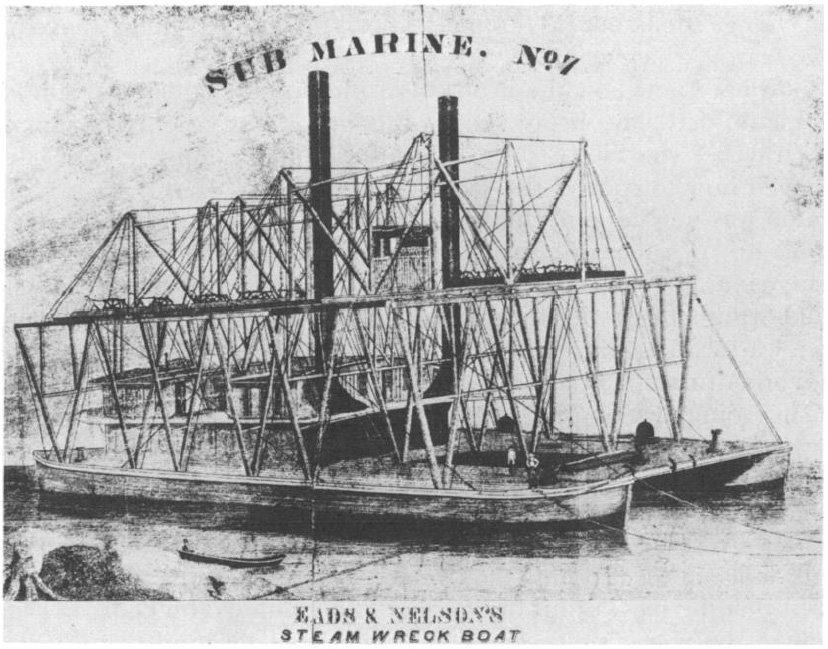
The Submarine No. 7

In the early days of the Civil War, before it was certain that the secession movement had been thwarted in St. Louis, and before it was known that Kentucky would remain in the Union, James B. Eads offered one of his salvage vessels, Submarine No. 7, to the Federal government for conversion to a warship for service on the western rivers. In a letter he wrote to Secretary of the Navy Gideon Welles, he pointed out that the catamaran-type hull of his boat (Note: In the mid-nineteenth century, a vessel that was not intended to venture on the open ocean was referred to as a boat and never a ship, no matter her size or construction. The distinction has been lost, except in rather special cases.) was already divided into several watertight compartments, and therefore could sustain numerous hits by enemy artillery without danger of sinking. As the interior of the country was the responsibility of the Army and not the Navy, Welles passed the letter on to Secretary of War Simon Cameron, who in turn referred it to Major General George B. McClellan for consideration. McClellan was commander of the Department of the Ohio, with responsibilities that included defense of the Ohio River and the parts of the Mississippi that were not in Confederate control.

At about the same time that McClellan received the letter, he also had a naval officer, Commander John Rodgers, added to his staff. Rodgers came with orders to provide the department with gunboats, either by acquiring civilian craft and converting them, or by having them built from the keel up. As the Eads letter meshed with the orders carried by Rodgers, McClellan passed responsibility on to him, ordering him to St. Louis to consult with Eads and see if his ideas were feasible. Rodgers did not like Submarine No. 7, but his negative assessment was overruled by Major General John C. Fremont, who succeeded McClellan when the latter was called to Washington to serve as General-in-Chief. Although Rodgers had opposed Eads's proposal, the two men were able to work together. This was the beginning of their short-lived but productive collaboration.

== City-class gunboats; Pook Turtles ==
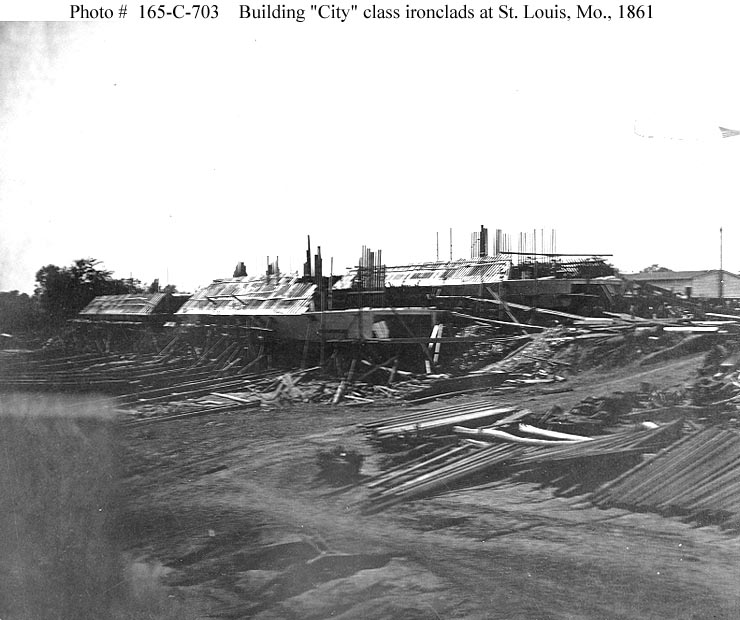
City-class ironclads under construction at St. Louis, Missouri in 1861.

In furtherance of Rodgers' orders, he and Eads drew up a set of requirements for a fleet of armored gunboats that would operate on the Mississippi. Rodgers knew, as his colleague did not, what characteristics would be required for a successful war vessel. Eads' contribution was equally vital, as he knew the characteristics of boats that could operate on the Mississippi, and also how to assemble the industry to build them. Together, they decided that the gunboats should have adequate armor to withstand direct shot from the artillery of the day; speed sufficient to be able to move against the current; shallow draft; and enough guns to present a serious and credible threat to the enemy. Not stated but well understood was the necessity of providing adequate accommodations for the crew, who would likely be forced to fight inside the protective shell of armor in the heat of a Southern summer.

To assist in the design of a vessel that would satisfy all of these requirements, Rodgers called for help from John Lenthall, the head of the Navy Department's Bureau of Construction, Equipment, and Repair. Lenthall provided some preliminary plans, but he had to devote most of his attention to ocean-going ships, so he withdrew. Fortunately, he was able to provide a substitute. The Navy Department already had under contract a man who had experience in designing river craft, one Samuel M. Pook, working at the time in Cairo, Illinois.

Pook designed a vessel, or rather a set of vessels, that drew only six feet (1.8 meters) while carrying 13 guns. Capable of 8 knots (15 km/h), each bore 2.5 inches (64 mm) of armor on the casemates and half that on the pilot house. In order to carry the machinery that would drive the great weight forward at speed while maintaining the light draft, the boats had to be made quite broad in relation to their length. Pook's solution was to give the hull three keels, the outboard pair somewhat longer than the one on the centerline. Propulsion was provided by a single paddle wheel at the after end of the center keel; the casemate armor that was carried back along the longer outboard keels provided the paddles a measure of protection from enemy gunfire from forward and abeam but not from astern. Each vessel as completed had a length overall of 175 feet (53 m) and a beam of 51 feet 2 inches (15.60 m). The length to beam ratio thus was a very small 3.4. The casemates had sloping sides, somewhat suggestive of the general shape of the best-known Confederate ship of the war, CSS Virginia (ex-USS Merrimack). When they were finally in the water, their awkward appearance struck the fancy of the farm boys who saw them, and they christened them "Pook's Turtles." The unofficial name stuck.

Eads submitted the winning bid for the contract to build seven boats to Pook's design. His bid was $89,600 per vessel, and he agreed to complete them by 10 October 1861. Because of changes in the design in the course of construction, the completion date was not met, and the cost more than doubled. By the end of January 1862, however, all had been delivered to the Army, where they were incorporated into the Western Gunboat Flotilla. The seven gunboats in the class were named for cities on the Mississippi or its tributaries. They were: USS Cairo, Carondelet, Cincinnati, Louisville, Mound City, Pittsburgh, and St. Louis (later renamed USS Baron DeKalb). The first four Eads gunboats were built at the Carondelet Marine Ways (today part of St. Louis). This was a logical choice as St. Louis had the dry dock facilities, was a machinery center, and had a ready supply of skilled tradesmen to do the required work. Most importantly, since the gunboats were to be used on the Mississippi River, building them at St. Louis meant that at completion, the boat could be quickly put into service. This was 1861 and the thinking still was that the war would be short. The three other gunboats were built at the Mound City Marine Railway & Shipyard facilities.

== Design ==
=== Armament ===
Positions were provided for 13 guns. Three gunports faced forward, four were on each side, and two aft. When they were first commissioned, the armament of most vessels of the class consisted of six 32-pounder and three 8-inch Dahlgren smooth bore guns and four 42-pounder army rifles. The exception was St. Louis (later Baron De Kalb), which had seven 32-pounders and two 8-inch Dahlgrens. In addition, some carried a single 12-pounder boat howitzer that is not counted as part of the armament. The mix of guns was changed later in the war; as this was done irregularly, refer to the individual ship articles.

=== Armor ===
The casemate armor was 2.5 inches (64 mm) thick, rolled in plates 13 inches (33 cm) wide and 8 to 13 feet (2.4 to 4.0 m) long. Total weight of the armor was 75 tons (68 tonnes). Pook's initial design called for armor only on the sides abreast the engines; Commander Rodgers, however, extended the plating to cover the forward casemate. The after casemate, hull, and deck not covered by the casemate were left unprotected. An additional 47 tons (43 tonnes) of armor was put on following the battle of Fort Pillow. At the same time, protection against ramming was given to the hulls by railroad iron at the stems and sterns.

=== Engines ===
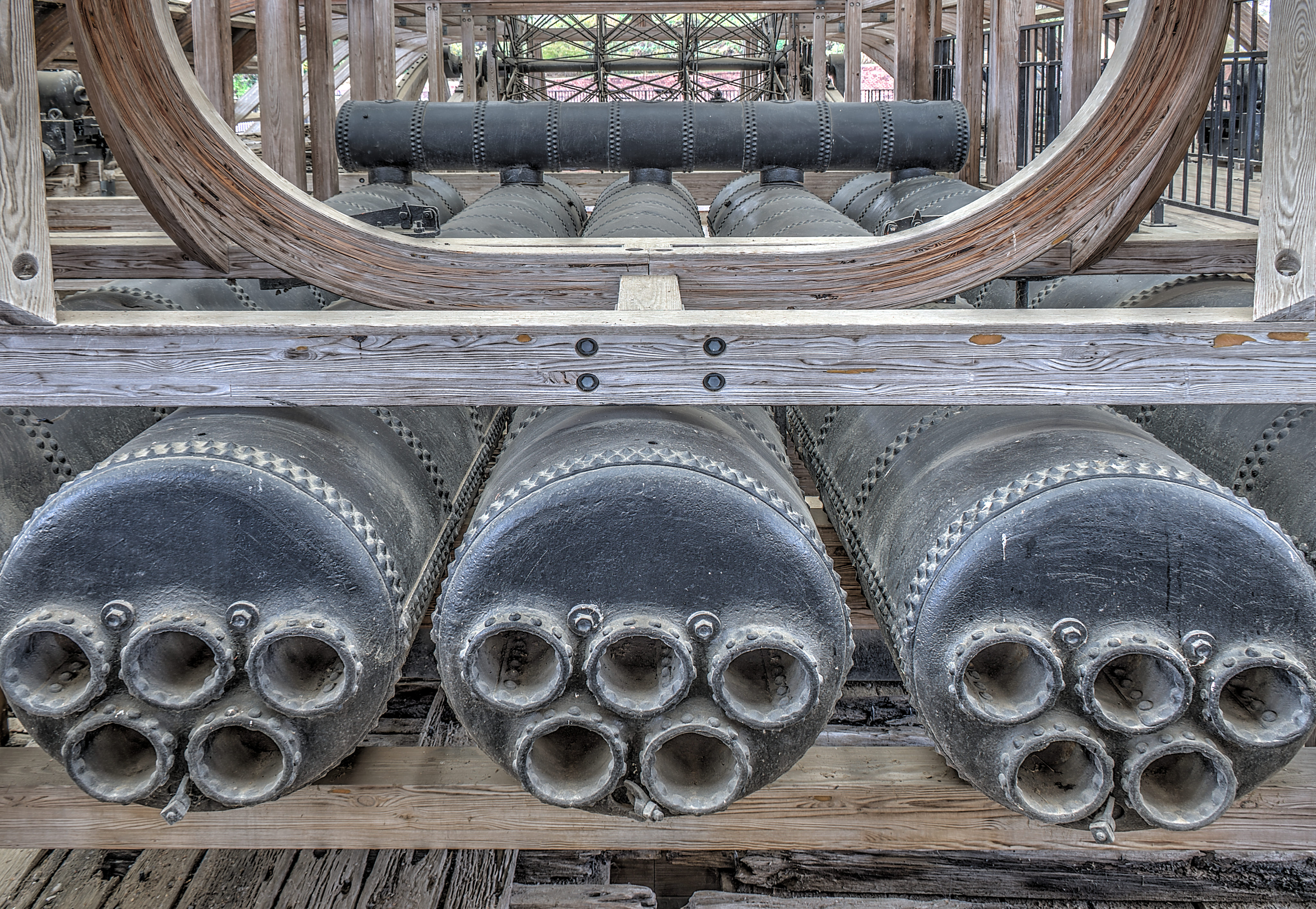
Restored boilers on the USS Cairo

The engines were designed by engineer Thomas Merritt. The 22-foot (6.7 m) paddlewheel was driven by two steam engines, mounted at opposite ends of the axle, 90 degrees apart. Five boilers, 36 inches (0.91 m) in diameter and 24 feet (7.3 m) long, gave steam to a cylinder 22 inches (0.56 m) in diameter with a six-foot (1.8 m) stroke.

The initial placement of the boilers proved to be unsatisfactory. In order to protect them from enemy shot, they had been crowded into shallow holds, causing the engines to work both water and steam. (Note: A steam engine's cylinders can only use steam to produce power. Liquid water in the cylinders does nothing at best, and since it is incompressible, at worst it will cause the engine to suffer "hydraulic lock", which can cause severe damage to cylinders, pistons, and other mechanical parts. A well-designed steam plant always takes steam from the highest point possible, to prevent liquid water from reaching the cylinders.) To remedy the problem, the steam drums had to be moved to the top of the boilers. This meant that they were no longer fully protected.

== Battles and other operations in which City-class gunboats participated ==
After the gunboats were completed but before their crews were filled out, several of them were pushed forward into the Battle of Fort Henry, February 6, 1862. The boats involved sustained some minor battle damage, but they achieved a complete victory unassisted by the Army. Their success at Fort Henry engendered exaggerated opinions of their effectiveness that were dashed only a week later. At the Battle of Fort Donelson, February 14, 1862, four of the gunboats bombarded the fort and received return fire. All four gunboats were forced out of action by damage they sustained, although the armor minimized casualties.

Two gunboats were vital in assisting the Army in blocking the escape of the Confederate garrison at the Battle of Island Number Ten, April 7, 1862. By running past the Confederate guns under cover of darkness, they gave the first example of the new tactic of bypassing fixed fortifications. The garrison at Island No. 10 made a point of surrendering to the Gunboat Flotilla.

Following the seizure of Island No. 10 and New Madrid, Missouri, the next target was Fort Pillow, upstream from Memphis. The mortar bombardment of the fort began on April 14, 1862, and continued until June 4, 1862. The gunboats assisted by protecting the mortars from Confederate counterattacks. One such counterattack, the Battle of Plum Point Bend, May 10, 1862, caught the flotilla unprepared for an assault by Rebel rams. Two of the gunboats were severely damaged, and avoided sinking only by grounding themselves in shallows.

The gunboats were vindicated less than a month later, when they again met the Confederate rams. Whereas at Plum Point Bend they had entered battle one at a time, this time they were a unified force that was ready for battle. At the First Battle of Memphis on June 6, 1862, four of the City-class gunboats were included in the flotilla that destroyed a force of eight Confederate rams, sinking or capturing seven of the enemy fleet. The gunboats suffered no damage in what was the most lopsided naval battle of the war.

Two City gunboats were among the vessels that accompanied the Army on an expedition into Arkansas along the White River. During the Battle of St. Charles, on June 17, 1862, a Rebel battery at St. Charles, Arkansas, fired a shot that penetrated the casemate of USS Mound City and exploded her steam drum. The escaping steam killed or scalded almost the entire crew. This chance shot soon led to the abandonment of the expedition.

The Western Gunboat Flotilla met the West Gulf Blockading Squadron at Vicksburg, Mississippi on July 1, 1862, where the two fleets attempted unsuccessfully to capture the city with only token support from the Army. On July 17, 1862, the armored CSS Arkansas encountered USS Carondelet and two other vessels on the Yazoo River. Carondelet was disabled, her steering being shot away, so she grounded. Arkansas then continued onto the Mississippi, where she passed through the rest of the Gunboat Flotilla and the West Gulf Squadron.

The gunboats, now part of the Navy's Mississippi River Squadron, cooperated with the Army in the better-supported campaign to capture Vicksburg late in 1862. On a scouting mission up the Yazoo River on December 12, 1862, USS Cairo struck two "torpedoes" (now called mines) and sank, without loss of life. She was the first ship to be sunk by mines in the war. On December 27, 1862, some gunboats feigned an attack on Haynes Bluff, but failed in their purpose of drawing off the Rebel defenses of Vicksburg. On December 28–30, 1862, other gunboats supported the Army by bombarding Confederate positions during the abortive assault at Chickasaw Bayou. Also as a part of the Vicksburg campaign, a joint Army-Navy force moved up the Arkansas River and attacked Fort Hindman on January 11, 1863. The Federal victory there was largely due to the destruction of the fort by the gunboats.

As efforts to bypass some of the Confederate defenses at Vicksburg, elements of the Mississippi Squadron engaged in two operations on minor tributaries of the Yazoo River. First was the Yazoo Pass Expedition, February 6– April 12, 1863, which included one City gunboat. The second, the Steele's Bayou Expedition, March 14–27, 1863, included five. Both expeditions proved futile. The primary reason for the failure was that the vessels were not well adapted to the environment in which they were used.

On the night of April 16–17, 1863, a large force of gunboats, including four City-class gunboats, ran past the Confederate batteries on the Mississippi River at Vicksburg. Most sustained only superficial damage during the passage. The ultimate aim of this movement was to assist General Ulysses S. Grant's intended move across the river to attack the defenses from the south. This committed the gunboats, as the boats could not return upstream while being subjected to bombardment from enemy shore batteries.

Initially, Grant planned to cross his army from the west side of the river to the east at Grand Gulf, Mississippi, just below Vicksburg, where the Rebels had set up a pair of batteries that they styled "forts." City-class gunboats were among the vessels used to bombard the batteries on April 29, 1863. Although the fleet was able to silence the lower battery and reduce the rate of fire of the upper battery, they could not put the latter completely out of action. The operation was therefore considered to be a failure, and Grant had to revise his plans to cross farther downstream.

After the Union army under Grant had successfully crossed the river and besieged Vicksburg from the Yazoo to the Mississippi, the Mississippi Squadron completed the encirclement by controlling the rivers. No notable naval actions resulted, but Grant regarded the Navy's contribution as a vital link in the campaign that finally ended on July 4, 1863, with the surrender of the city and its garrison.

During the siege of Vicksburg, part of the Mississippi Squadron, including one City-class gunboat, was diverted into the Red River to capture Alexandria, Louisiana, and attack nearby Fort De Russy, May 4–17, 1863. The city fell with no struggle, but the attack on the fort fell on empty air, as its defenders had fled. Despite the lack of opposition, too much time would have been needed to destroy the fort completely.

Once the Mississippi was opened following the fall of Vicksburg and Port Hudson, naval activity on the river virtually ceased. In this period of relative calm, USS Baron De Kalb (ex-St. Louis) was sunk in the Yazoo River by two Confederate torpedoes on July 13, 1863. Much of the Mississippi Squadron, including the five remaining City-class gunboats, took part in the ill-fated Red River campaign, in which they were almost lost because of falling water levels. This was their final significant action.

All five surviving gunboats were sold for scrap shortly after the end of the war.

== Evaluation of the gunboats ==
The only meaningful evaluation of a warship is by comparison with its contemporaries in function. By this scale, the City-class gunboats must be given very good grades, as they combined firepower, protection, and mobility in a manner achieved by few of their contemporaries. Nevertheless, they had certain design flaws that would have had to be corrected in later ships of their general type.

Their weakest point was the hull. Not only was the hull easily penetrated, but once breached, there was no way to isolate the damage, such as by watertight compartments. This made them vulnerable to mines (Cairo and Baron De Kalb) and to ramming (Cincinnati and Mound City).

Their armor was inadequate in two respects: both the deck and the stern were uncovered. The lack of deck armor made them vulnerable to plunging fire, which they encountered most famously at the Battle of Fort Donelson. The gaps in the armor left the steering cables uncovered, so at Fort Donelson and other encounters, their steering was knocked out rather easily.

In common with all other ships of their era, no provision was made for confining escaping steam if the boilers were to suffer battle damage. The most prominent example of the evil consequences of this lack of foresight was the Mound City disaster of 17 June 1862, but other ships suffered similarly, if not to the same degree.

The peculiar three-keel construction and confined paddlewheel created steering problems that are often overlooked. The gunboats could not be backed against the current. These handling characteristics affected their use at the Battles of Island Number Ten and Memphis.

== Gallery ==
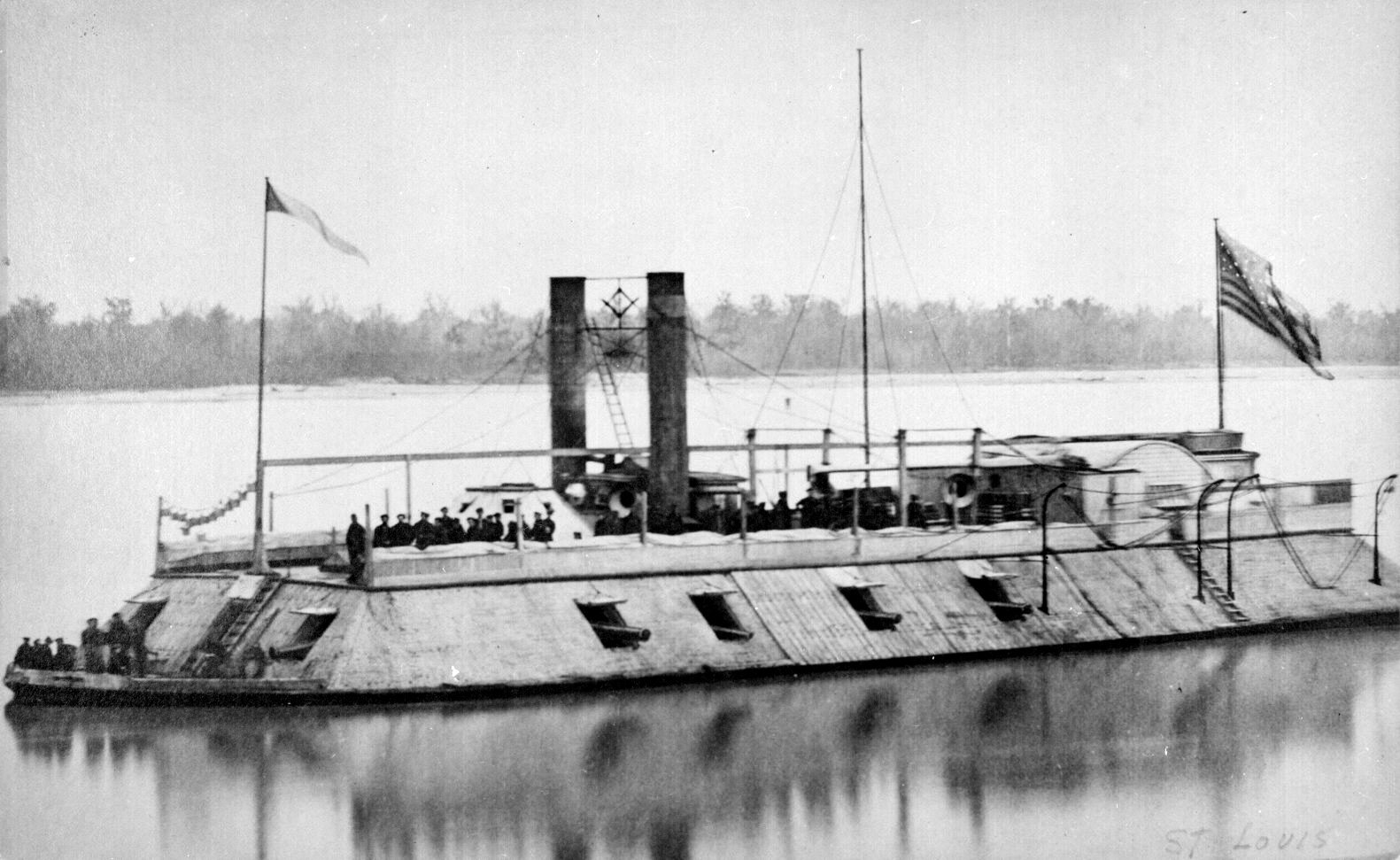
USS Baron DeKalb

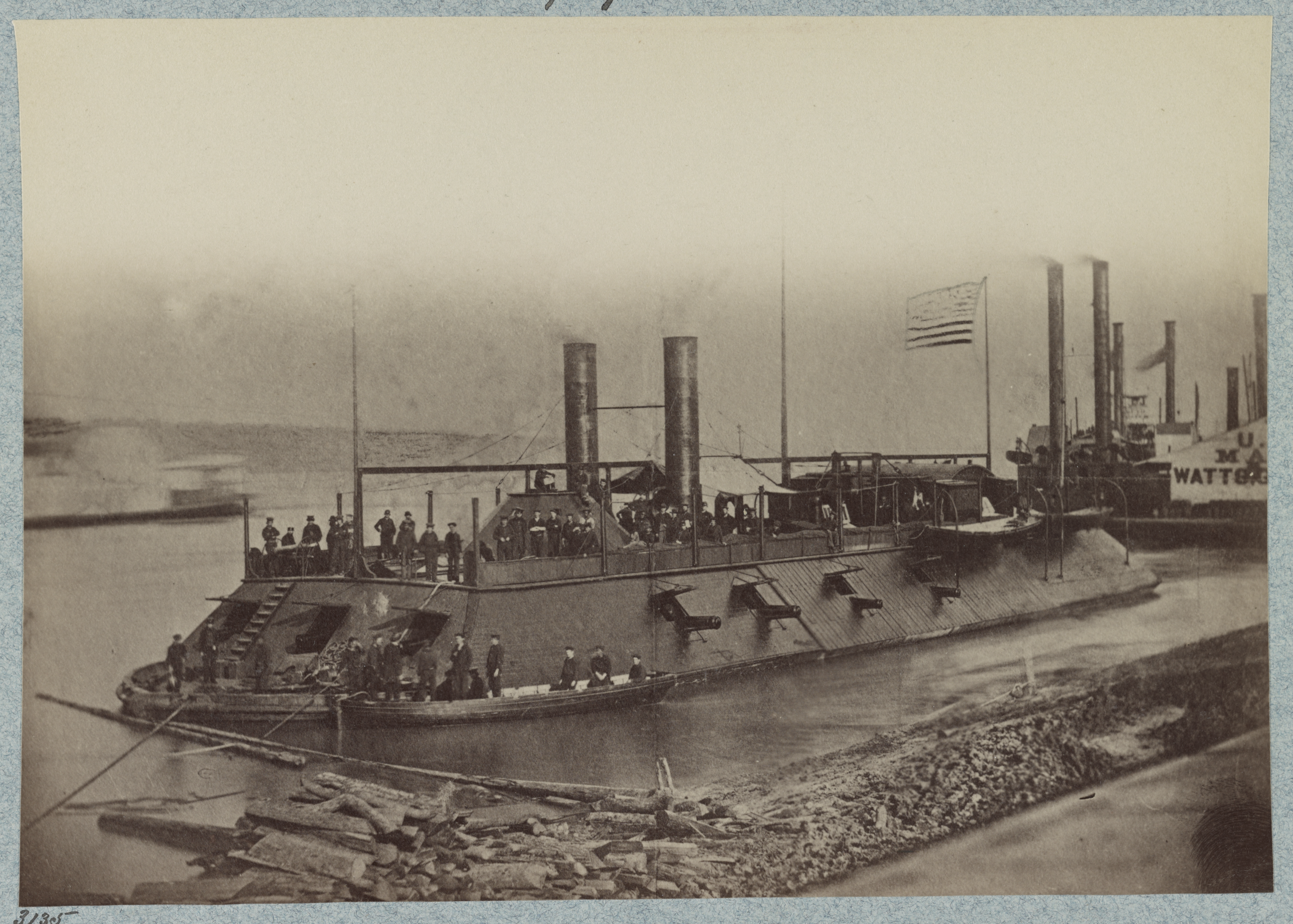
USS Cairo

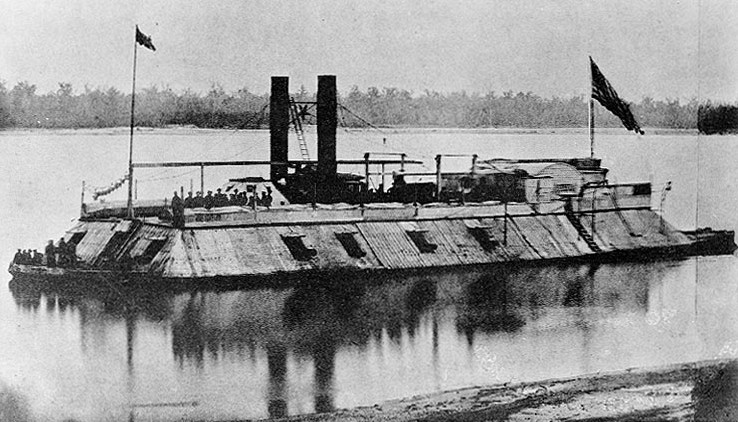
USS Carondelet

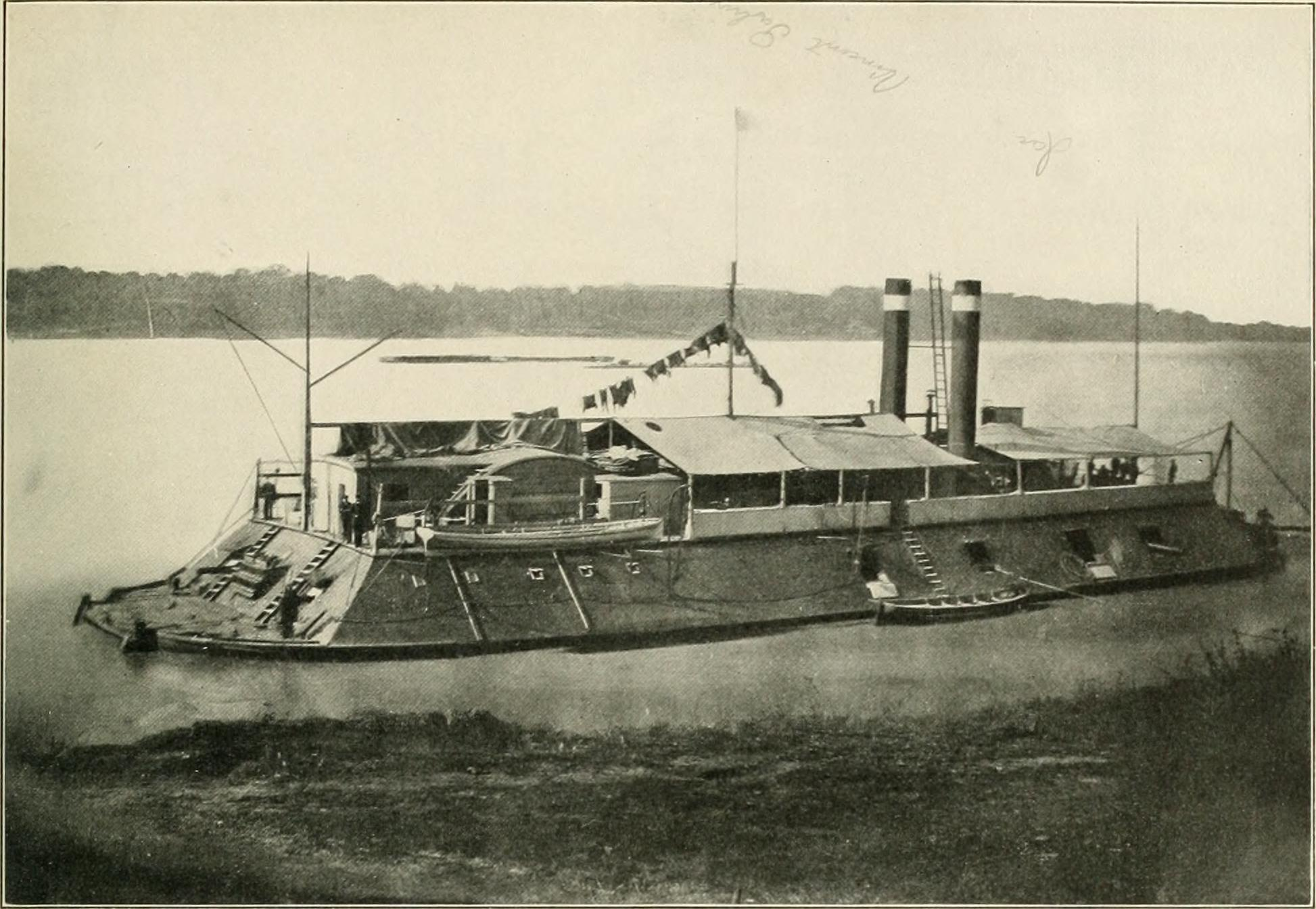
USS Cincinnati

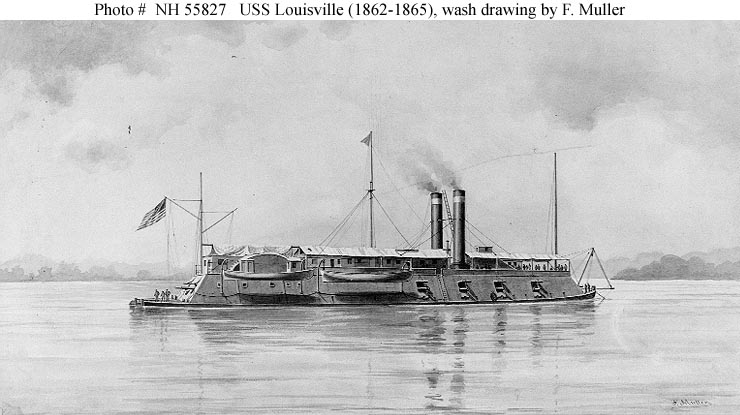
USS Louisville

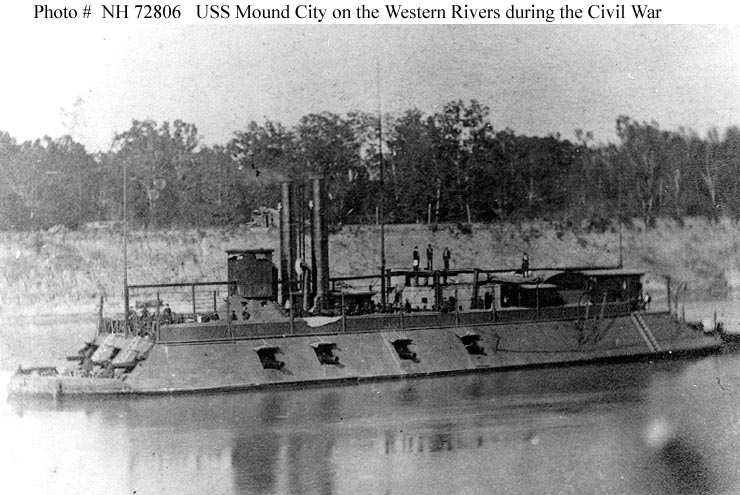
USS Mound City, circa 1864–65

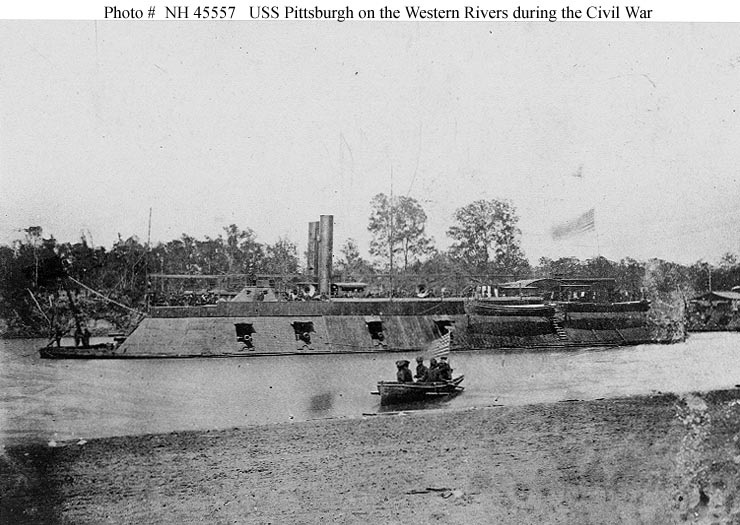
USS Pittsburgh

== Museum ship ==
The wreck of USS Cairo was located in 1956 and has been recovered. The gunboat and associated artifacts are now displayed in a museum in Vicksburg National Military Park, maintained by the National Park Service.

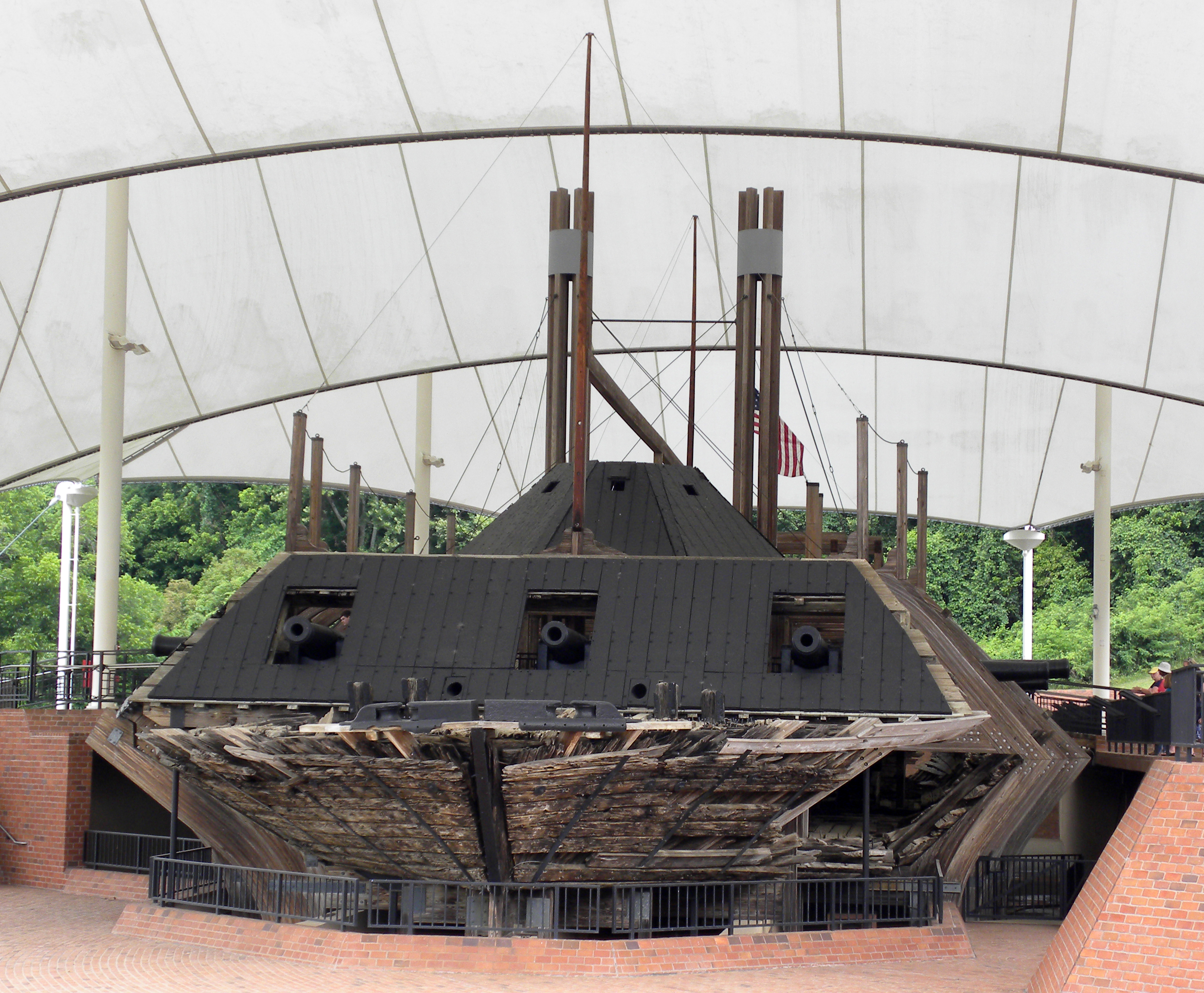
USS Cairo in her final resting place at Vicksburg National Military Park. The canopy shown here has been replaced.

== See also ==
- Mississippi Squadron

== Citations ==
Abbreviations used in these notes:

ORA (Official records, armies): War of the Rebellion: a compilation of the official records of the Union and Confederate Armies.
ORN (Official records, navies): Official records of the Union and Confederate Navies in the War of the Rebellion.
