= Mississippi River Squadron =

Union naval unit of the American Civil War (1861–65)

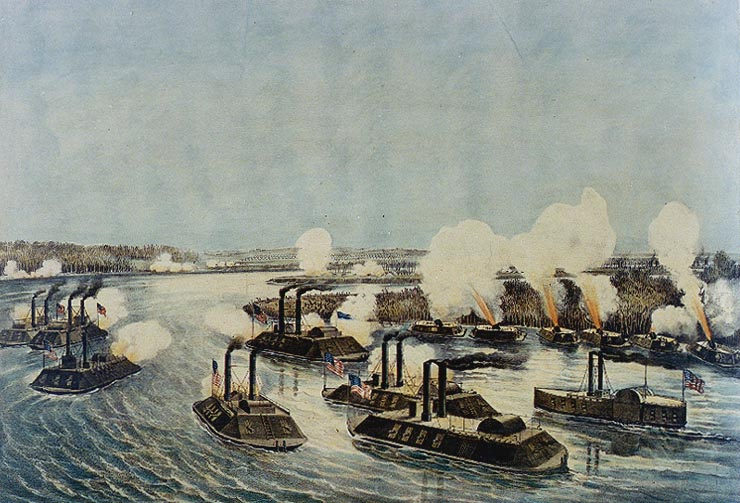
- Vessels of the Mississippi River Squadron in the Battle of Island Number Ten.
- Active: 1861 - 1865
- Country: United States: Union
- Branch: United States Navy: Union Navy
- Type: Naval squadron
- Engagements: American Civil War

The Mississippi River Squadron was the Union brown-water naval squadron that operated on the western rivers during the American Civil War. It was initially created as a part of the Union Army, although it was commanded by naval officers, and was then known as the Western Gunboat Flotilla and sometimes as the Mississippi Flotilla. It received its final designation when it was transferred to the Union Navy at the beginning of October 1862.

== History ==
=== American Civil War ===
The squadron was created on May 16, 1861, and was controlled by the Union Army until September 30, 1862. John Rodgers was the first commander of the squadron and was responsible for the construction and organization of the fleet. Flag Officer Andrew H. Foote relieved Rodgers and encouraged the army commander in the west, Major General Henry W. Halleck, to authorize an expedition down the Tennessee River against Fort Henry. Operating in conjunction with Ulysses S. Grant's Army of the District of Cairo, Foote subdued Fort Henry before Grant's troops could take their positions.

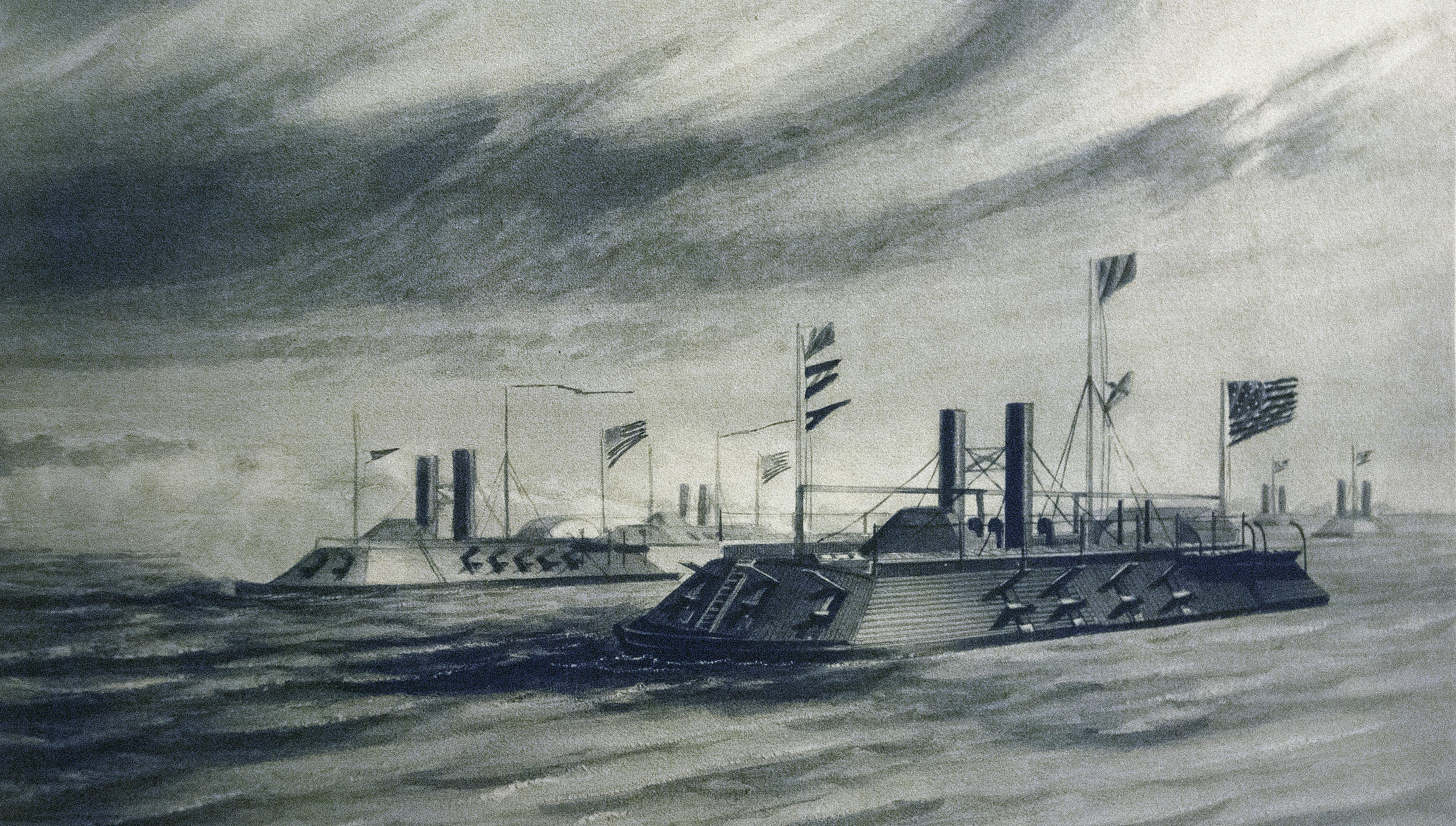
Rear Admiral David D. Porter's flagship

Foote led the squadron in the attack on Fort Donelson and then joined with Maj. Gen. John Pope's Army of the Mississippi for a joint attack on Island No. 10 on the Mississippi River. Charles H. Davis relieved Foote and proceeded to take Fort Pillow on the Mississippi. The U. S. Ram Fleet, commanded by Colonel Charles Ellet, Jr., accompanied the squadron during the First Battle of Memphis. After the capture of Memphis the squadron was transferred to the control of the U.S. Navy. The transfer included the Ram Fleet, by then reconstituted as the Mississippi Marine Brigade. Davis aided Grant's unsuccessful first campaign against Vicksburg. Rear Admiral David D. Porter relieved Davis in command and led the squadron at Arkansas Post and during the successful Vicksburg Campaign and siege of the city.

=== Red River Campaign ===
Porter led the squadron during the disastrous Red River Campaign of 1864, and when the waters of the river dropped, the fleet was almost lost. The engineering abilities of Colonel Joseph Bailey, who supervised the construction of Bailey's Dam, helped save the fleet. During the Red River Campaign, the Mississippi Squadron was composed of 10 ironclads, 3 monitors, 11 tin-clads, 1 timber-clad, 1 ram and various support vessels, including vessels in the following table:

Ship	Type
USS Osage	Neosho class twin-turret river monitor
USS Neosho	Neosho class twin-turret river monitor
USS Ozark	single-turret river monitor
USS Eastport	casemate ironclad
USS Essex	casemate ironclad
USS Baron DeKalb	City class casemate ironclad
USS Benton	casemate ironclad, flagship
USS Carondelet	City class casemate ironclad
USS Cincinnati	City class casemate ironclad
USS Louisville	City class casemate ironclad
USS Mound City	City class casemate ironclad
USS Pittsburgh	City class casemate ironclad
USS Lexington	timberclad
USS Moose	sternwheel steamer
USS Ouachita	sidewheeler steamer
USS Nyanza	sidewheeler steamer

Command temporarily passed to Alexander Pennock before Samuel P. Lee assumed command. Lee was in command until the squadron was discontinued on August 14, 1865.

=== List of Commanding Officers ===
Squadron Commander	From	To	Major Battles
Commander John Rodgers	16 May 1861	30 August 1861	construction of squadron
Flag Officer Andrew H. Foote	30 August 1861	9 May 1862	Fort Henry, Fort Donelson, Island No. 10
Flag Officer Charles H. Davis	9 May 1862	15 October 1862	Fort Pillow, Memphis, Chickasaw Bayou
Rear Admiral David D. Porter	15 October 1862	July 1864	Arkansas Post, Vicksburg, Red River Campaign
Captain Alexander M. Pennock	July 1864	1 November 1864	temporary
Rear Admiral Samuel P. Lee	1 November 1864	14 August 1865	

== See also ==
- Mississippi River in the American Civil War
- Mississippi Marine Brigade
- United States Ram Fleet
