= USS Carondelet =

Gunboat of the United States Navy

Coordinates: 38.687049°N 83.577544°W

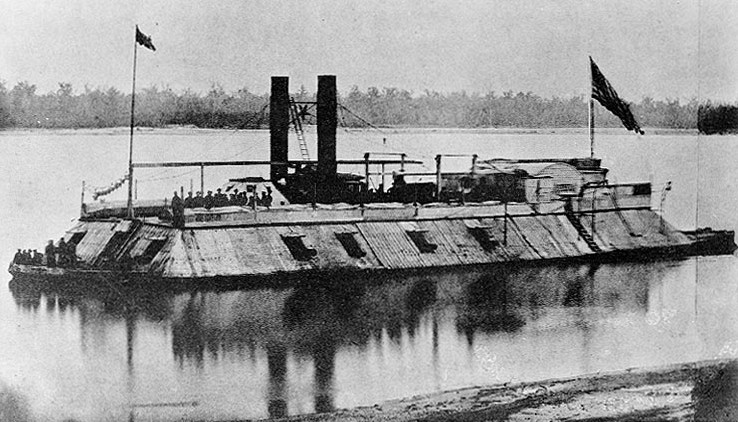
- USS Carondelet

History

United States
- Namesake: Carondelet, St. Louis
- Laid down: August, 1861
- Launched: October, 1861, at St. Louis, Missouri
- Commissioned: 15 January 1862; at Cairo, Illinois
- Decommissioned: 20 June 1865; at Mound City, Illinois
- Stricken: 1865 (est.), sold, 29 November 1865
- Fate: Sunk in Ohio River, 1873, severely damaged during dredging, 1982

General characteristics
- Class & type: City-class ironclad gunboat
- Displacement: 512 tons
- Length: 175 ft (53 m)
- Beam: 51 ft 2 in (15.60 m)
- Draft: 6 ft (1.8 m)
- Propulsion: Steam engine
- Speed: 4 knots (7.4 km/h; 4.6 mph)
- Complement: 251 officers and enlisted
- Armament: (see section below)
- Armor: Casemate:2.5 in (64 mm); Pilothouse: 1.25 in (32 mm)

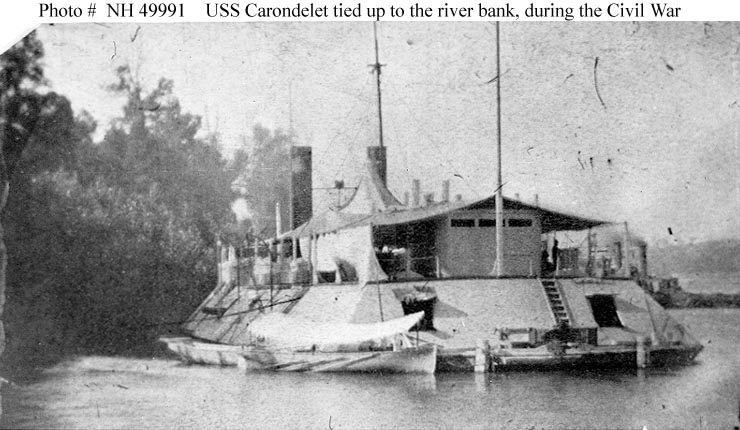
Stern view of USS Carondelet tied up to a river bank during the American Civil War.

USS Carondelet (/kəˈrɒndəlɛt/ kə-RON-də-let) (1861) was a City-class ironclad gunboat constructed for the War Department by James B. Eads during the American Civil War. It was named for the town where it was built, Carondelet, Missouri.

Carondelet was designed for service on the western rivers, with a combination of shallow draft and variety of heavy guns (and a light howitzer), she was suited for riverside bombardment and ship-to-ship combat against Confederate gunboats.

== Built in Carondelet Missouri in 1861 ==
USS Carondelet, an ironclad river gunboat, was built in 1861 by James Eads and Co., St. Louis, Missouri, at the Union Iron Works, in Carondelet, Missouri under contract to the United States Department of War. Carondelet was commissioned on 15 January 1862, at Cairo, Illinois, U.S. Navy Commander Henry A. Walke in command, and reported to Army's Western Gunboat Flotilla, commanded by U.S. Navy Flag Officer Andrew Hull Foote.

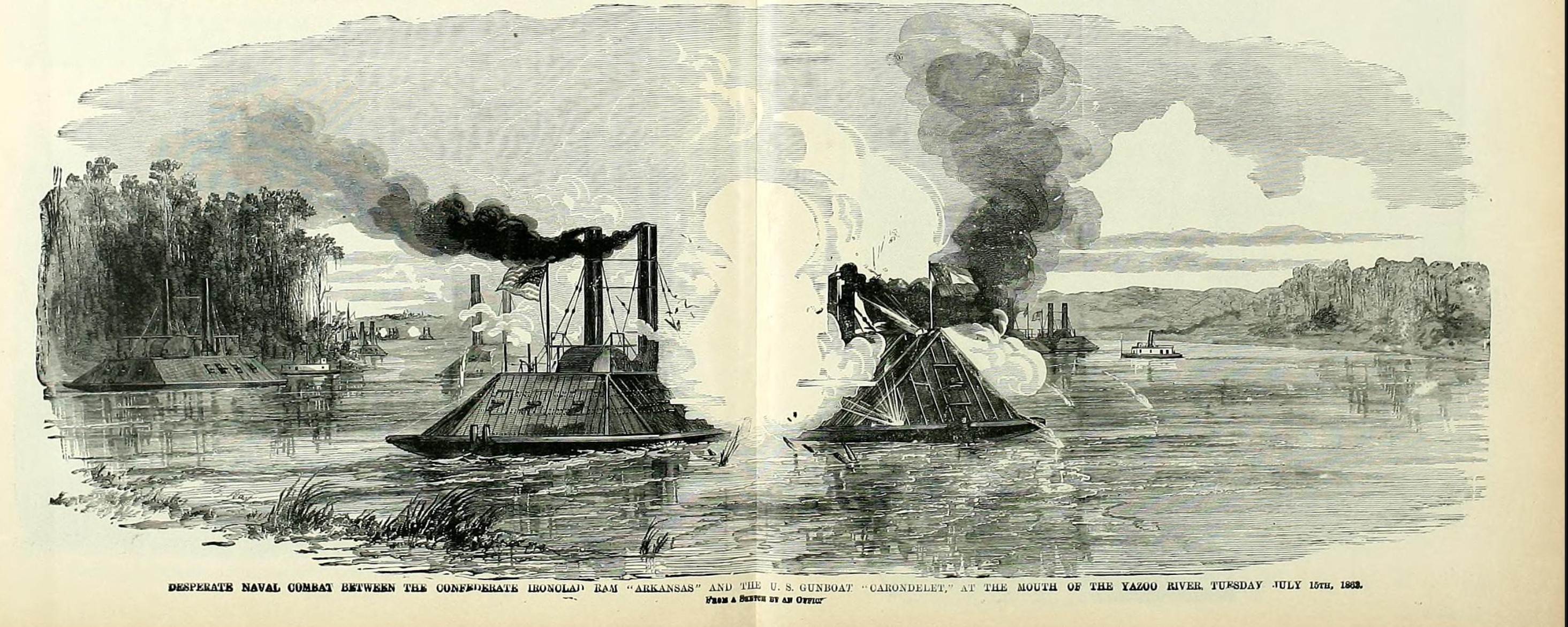
Desperate naval combat between the confederate Ironclad ram Arkansas and a group of Union ships at the mouth of the Yazoo river, 15th July 1863

== Civil War service ==
=== Union Army service ===
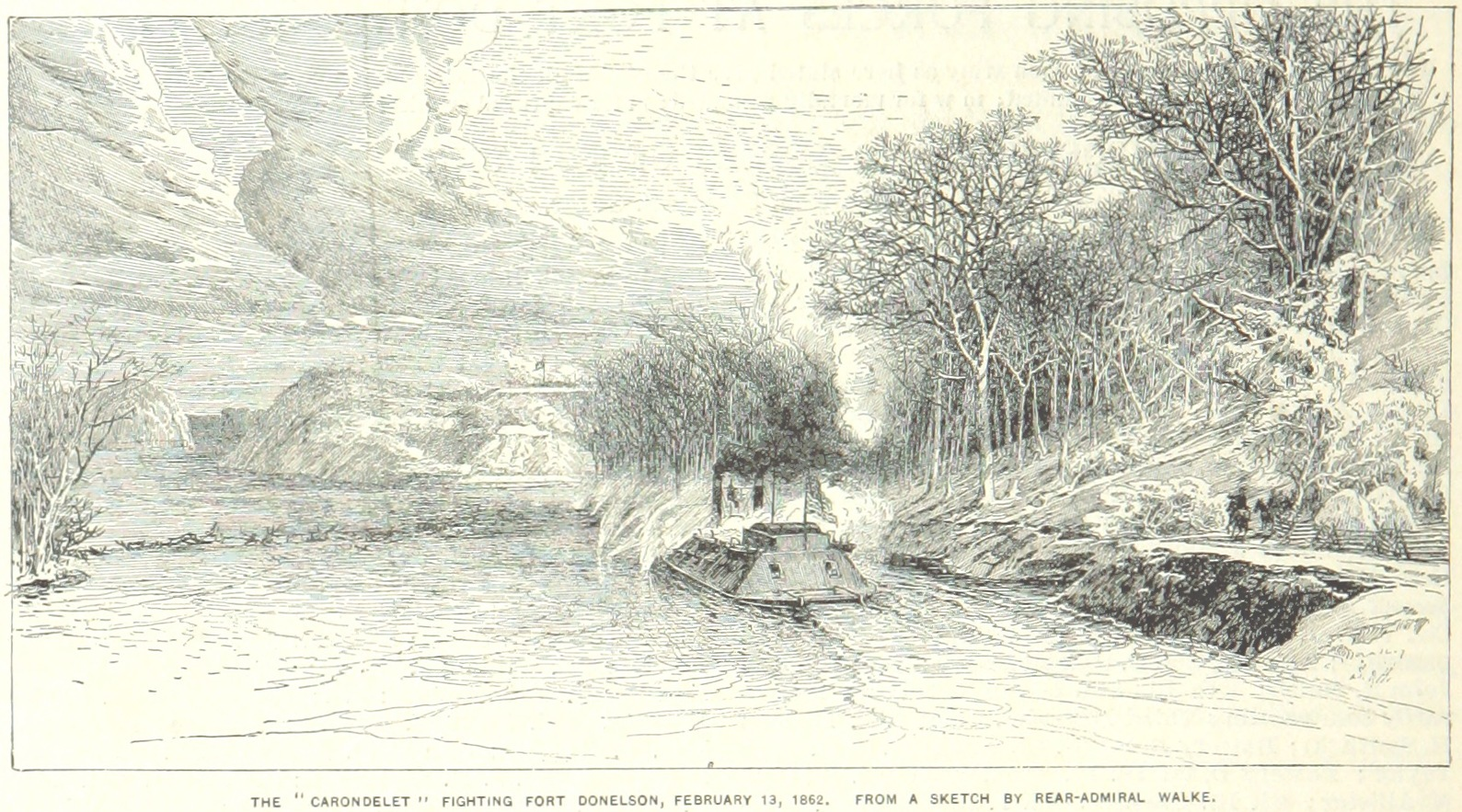
Carondelet attacks Fort Donelson

Between January and October 1862, Carondelet operated almost constantly on river patrol and in the capture of Fort Henry and Fort Donelson in February; the passing of Island No. 10 and the attack on and spiking of the shore batteries below New Madrid, Missouri, in April; the lengthy series of operations against Plum Point Bend, Fort Pillow, and Memphis, Tennessee, from April through June, and the engagement with CSS Arkansas on 15 July, during which Carondelet was heavily damaged and suffered 35 casualties.

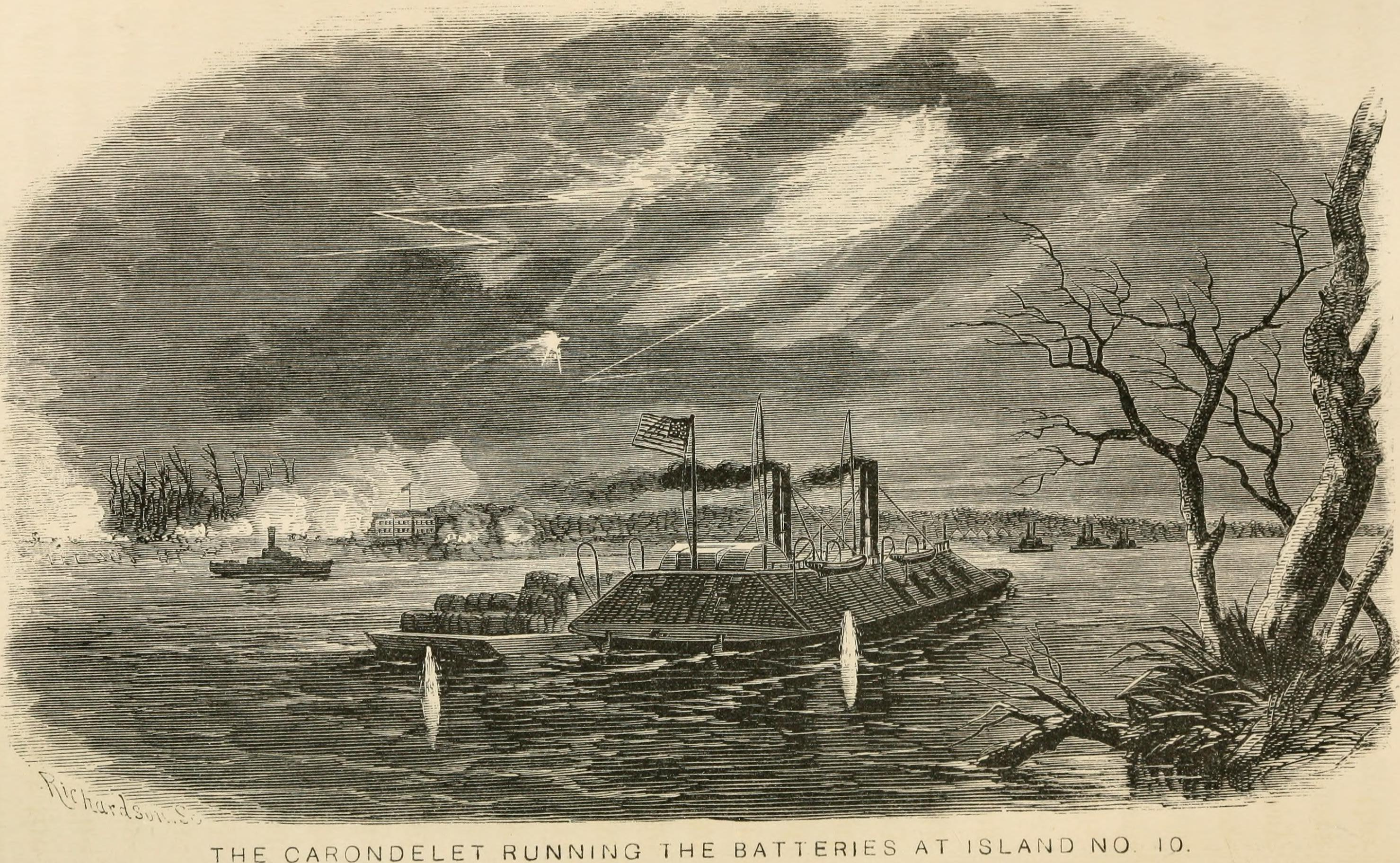
Carondelet running the Rebel batteries at Island No. 10

=== Union Navy service ===
Transferred to Navy control with the other ships of her flotilla on 1 October 1862, Carondelet continued the rapid pace of her operations, taking part in the unsuccessful Steele's Bayou Expedition in March 1863.

One of those to pass the Vicksburg and Warrenton, Mississippi batteries in April 1863, Carondelet took part on 29 April in the five-and-a-half-hour engagement with the batteries at Grand Gulf. She remained on duty off Vicksburg, bombarding the city in its long siege from May to July. Without her and her sisters and other naval forces, the great operations on the rivers would not have been possible and the Federal victory might not have been won.

From 7 March to 15 May 1864, she sailed with the Red River Expedition, and during operations in support of Union Army movements ashore, took part in the Bell's Mill engagement (part of the Franklin-Nashville Campaign) of December 1864. For the remainder of the war, Carondelet patrolled in the Cumberland River.

=== Commanding Officers ===
Carondelet had several commanding officers over the duration of her service.

Commanding Officers and Ship Masters
U.S. Navy Rank	Name (First, Last)	Command Dates
• Captain • Lieutenant Commander • Lieutenant • Acting Master • Lieutenant • Acting Master • Lieutenant • Lieutenant	• Henry A. Walke • James A. Greer • John McLeod Murphy • James C. Gipson • John G. Mitchell • Charles W. Miller • Charles P. Clark • John Rodgers	• Jan. 1862-Jan. 1863 • Jan. 1863-Feb. 1863 • Mar. 1863-Oct. 1863 • Nov. 1863-Jan. 1864 • Feb. 1864-Nov. 1864 • Dec. 1864 • Jan. 1865 • Feb. 1865-Jun. 1865

During the Civil War four of Carondelet's crew members were awarded the Medal of Honor: Signal Quartermaster Matthew Arther for actions at the Battles of Fort Henry and Fort Donelson, February 1862; Seaman John Henry Dorman for actions in various engagements; Fireman Michael Huskey, for actions during Steele's Bayou Expedition, March 1863; and Coxswain John G. Morrison, for actions in the engagement with CSS Arkansas, 15 July 1862.

== Post-war decommissioning and sale ==
She was decommissioned at Mound City, Illinois, on 20 June 1865, and sold there on 29 November 1865.

== Subsequent career and sinking ==
In 1873, shortly before she was to be scrapped, a flood swept Carondelet from her moorings in Gallipolis, Ohio. She then drifted approximately 130 miles down the Ohio River, where she grounded near Manchester, Ohio. Her ultimate fate remained unknown until a May 1982 search operation by Clive Cussler's National Underwater and Marine Agency pinpointed the location of the wreckage, just two days after a dredge passed directly over the wreckage, demolishing most of the wrecked vessel.

== Armament ==
Like many of the Mississippi theatre ironclads, USS Carondelet had its armament changed multiple times over life of the vessel. To expedite the entrance of Carondelet into service, she and the other City-class gunboats were fitted with whatever weapons were available; then had their weapons upgraded as new pieces became available. Though the 8 in (200 mm) Dahlgren smoothbore cannons were fairly modern most of the other original armaments were antiquated; such as the 32-pounders, or modified; such as the 42-pounder "rifles" which were in fact, old smoothbores that had been gouged out to give them rifling. These 42-pounder weapons were of particular concern to military commanders because they were structurally weaker and more prone to exploding than purpose-built rifled cannons. Additionally, the close confines of riverine combat greatly increased the threat of boarding parties. The 12-pounder howitzer was equipped to address that concern and was not used in regular combat.

Ordnance characteristics
January 1862	May 1863	January 1864
• 4 × 8-inch smoothbores • 1 × 50-pounder rifle • 1 × 42-pounder rifle • 6 × 32-pounder rifles • 1 × 30-pounder rifle • 1 × 12-pounder rifle	• 3 × 9-inch smoothbores • 4 × 8-inch smoothbores • 1 × 50-pounder rifle • 1 × 42-pounder rifle • 1 × 32-pounder rifle • 1 × 30-pounder rifle • 1 × 12-pounder rifle	• 3 × 9-inch smoothbores • 4 × 8-inch smoothbores • 2 × 100-pounder rifles • 1 × 50-pounder rifle • 1 × 30-pounder rifle • 1 × 12-pounder rifle

== See also ==
- Union Navy
- Anaconda Plan
- Mississippi Squadron
