= USS Stevens =

Two ships in the United States Navy have been named USS Stevens. The first was named in honor of Captain Thomas Holdup Stevens (1795–1841), and the second for both Capt. Stevens and his son, Rear Admiral Thomas H. Stevens, Jr. (1819–1896).

- The first USS Stevens (DD-86) was a Wickes-class destroyer, launched in 1918 and struck in 1936.
- The second USS Stevens (DD-479) was a Fletcher-class destroyer, launched in 1942 and struck in 1973.

== See also ==
- USS Ted Stevens (DDG-128), an Arleigh Burke-class guided missile destroyer, ordered in 2018 and named for United States Senator Ted Stevens.
