= USS Philip =

Two ships in the United States Navy have been named USS Philip in honor of John Woodward Philip, a distinguished naval officer of the American Civil War and Spanish–American War.

- The first USS Philip (DD-76) was a Wickes-class destroyer.
- The second USS Philip (DD-498) was a Fletcher-class destroyer in World War II.
