= Alex Bradley =

Alexander or Alex Bradley may refer to:

- Alex Bradley (basketball) (born 1959), retired American basketball player
- Alex Bradley (rugby union) (born 1981), New Zealand rugby union footballer
- Alex Bradley (footballer) (born 1999), Finnish footballer
- Alexander Bradley (1851–1925), United States Navy sailor and Medal of Honor recipient
