= USS Waller =

Fletcher-class destroyer

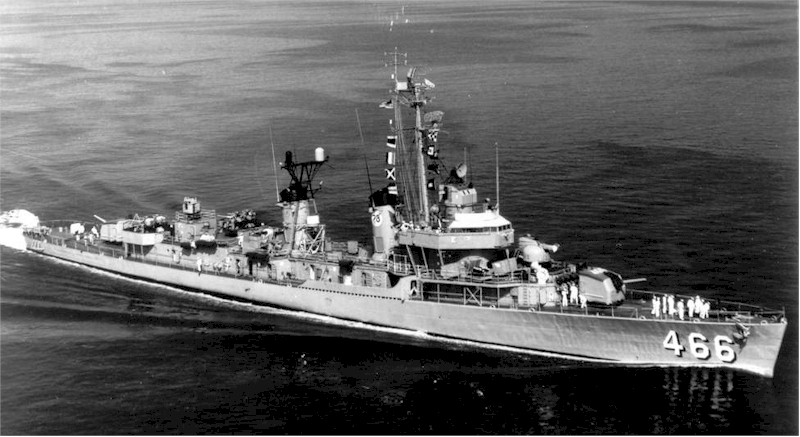
- USS Waller (DD-466)

History

United States
- Name: Waller
- Namesake: Major General Littleton Waller
- Builder: Federal Shipbuilding and Drydock Company, Kearny, New Jersey
- Laid down: 12 February 1942
- Launched: 15 August 1942
- Commissioned: 1 October 1942
- Decommissioned: 15 July 1969
- Stricken: 15 July 1969
- Fate: Sunk as target, 17 June 1970

General characteristics
- Class & type: Fletcher-class destroyer
- Displacement: 2,050 tons
- Length: 376 ft 6 in (114.7 m)
- Beam: 39 ft 8 in (12.1 m)
- Draft: 17 ft 9 in (5.4 m)
- Propulsion: 60,000 shp (45 MW); 2 propellers
- Speed: 35 knots (65 km/h; 40 mph)
- Range: 6500 nmi. (12,000 km) at 15 kt
- Complement: 329
- Armament: 5 × single Mk 12 5 in (127 mm)/38 guns; 5 × twin 40 mm (1.6 in) Bofors AA guns; 7 × single 20 mm (0.8 in) Oerlikon AA guns; 2 × quintuple 21 in (533 mm) torpedo tubes; 6 × single depth charge throwers; 2 × depth charge racks

USS Waller (DD/DDE-466), a Fletcher-class destroyer, was a ship of the United States Navy named for Major General Littleton Waller, USMC (1856–1926).

Waller was laid down on 12 February 1942, at Kearny, N.J., by the Federal Shipbuilding and Drydock Co.; launched on 15 August 1942, sponsored by Mrs. Littleton W. T. Waller, the widow of General Waller; and commissioned on 1 October 1942, Lieutenant Commander Laurence H. Frost in command.

== World War II ==
Into the fall of 1942, Waller conducted shakedown out of Casco Bay, Maine, and occasionally performed local escort duties for training submarines based at New London, Conn. Late that fall, Waller departed the New York Navy Yard, Brooklyn, N.Y., bound for the Pacific, via the Panama Canal and Pearl Harbor.

She arrived at Efate on 21 January 1943 and, six days later, sortied as part of the destroyer screen with Task Force 18 (TF 18). Rear Admiral Robert C. Giffen, commanding the force, flew his flag in Wichita (CA-45). The mission of TF 18 was to rendezvous off Guadalcanal with a transport force sent to resupply and reinforce the land-based forces there in their struggle to dislodge the Japanese from the key island. Intelligence reports indicated—wrongly, as it turned out—that the Japanese were mounting a big "push" to resupply their forces. As events would show, they were instead massing forces to evacuate their troops.

=== Rennel Island, January 1943 ===
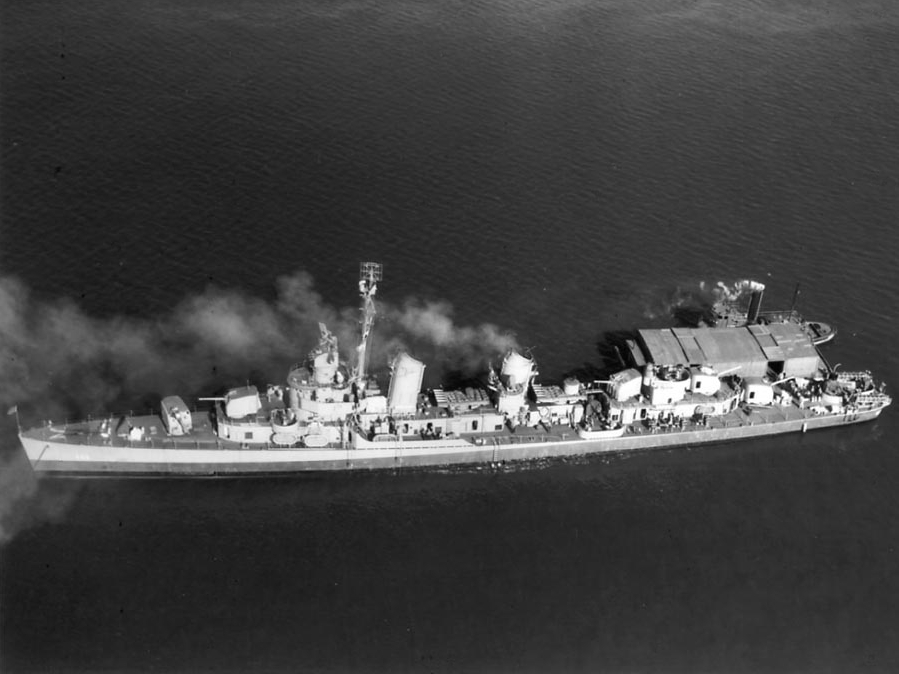
Waller in October 1942.

On 29 January, 50 miles (80 km) to the north of Rennell Island, Japanese torpedo-carrying "Betty" bombers (Mitsubishi G4M-1s) came in low from the east carefully avoiding silhouetting themselves against the afterglow of dusk. Waller, on the starboard beam of flagship Wichita and cruisers Chicago (CA-29) and Louisville (CA-28), came under machine-gun fire from the lead "Betty" as it bore in on the attack. The American ships responded with heavy fire toward the first two planes, and one cartwheeled into the sea and exploded in a brilliant fireball.

Soon red, green, and white flares gave the scene an eerie, ghostly effect, as the Japanese set off pyrotechnics to illuminate the American force. At 19:31, another flight of "Betties" appeared and pressed their attacks on the heavy cruisers steaming in the right van of the task force. One "Betty" splashed into the sea astern of Waller, before another enemy aircraft scored a torpedo hit on Chicago at 19:45, holing the cruiser's starboard side forward, and stopping three of the ship's four drive-shafts. A second torpedo soon struck home after the first, flooding number three fireroom and the forward engine room leaving Chicago dead in the water.

The attack momentarily subsided, giving the Americans a respite. Louisville took her crippled sister in tow, and, by early on 30 January, the damaged cruiser was on her way to Espiritu Santo at four knots. At 14:45, well after Louisville had passed the tow to the tugboat Navajo (AT-64), 12 "Betties" were reported south of New Georgia heading for Rennell Island. Combat air patrol fighters from USS Enterprise (CV-6) splashed three of the attackers, but nine remained to attack Chicago. Seven of these went down to the antiaircraft fire from the task force and the attacks by Grumman F4F Wildcats from Enterprise. Waller claimed one Mitsubishi G4M "Betty" downed and two damaged.

Chicago, however, took two more torpedoes and was abandoned soon thereafter, sinking stern-first, at 16:44. Navajo, Sands (APD-13), Edwards (DD-619), and Waller collected 1,049 survivors from the cruiser. In the melee, La Vallette (DD-448) was damaged and left the area, towed by Navajo. While retiring to Espiritu Santo, Waller located a submarine contact but could not develop it.

The Battle of Rennell Island, which resulted in the loss of one American cruiser and damage to a destroyer succeeded in diverting Japanese intentions from the transports off Lunga Point and allowed vital American reinforcements to enter the final phase of the battle to drive the Japanese from Guadalcanal.

=== Blackett Strait, March 1943 ===
In early March 1943, Captain Arleigh "31-knot" Burke broke his broad pennant in Waller. On the 5th, she led Conway (DD-507), Montpelier (CL-57), Cleveland (CL-55), Denver (CL-58), and Cony (DD-508) in a raid on the Japanese airfields at Vila, on the southern coast of New Georgia. Assigned to protect the larger ships, the destroyers drew the duty of silencing any hostile shore batteries which might try to interfere with the cruisers as they carried out the main bombardment.

Entering Kula Gulf shortly after midnight on 5 March, Waller's radar detected two ships—later determined to be Murasame and Minegumo—at the eastern entrance to Blackett Strait and standing out at high speed, apparently unaware of the American ships' presence. Waller opened the action at about 01:00, firing a five-tube spread of torpedoes at a range of three and one-half miles. A minute later, her gunners soon commenced fire with the main battery.

Taken by surprise, the two Japanese destroyers answered with ragged and inaccurate fire. Six minutes after action had commenced, Murasame broke in two from an "extremely violent" explosion, the victim of a combination of torpedoes and gunfire from Waller and her mates.

Minegumo, too, came in for her share of attention and was soon reduced to junk although she stubbornly remained afloat for a short while. Leaving the Japanese in their wakes, the American force swung westward at 01:14 and soon thereafter commenced their scheduled bombardment of Vila. The six American ships pounded the air strip for 16 minutes before breaking off action and leaving a number of fires burning brightly in the darkness. Waller was ordered to dispatch Minegumo but the blazing wreck sank before the American destroyer could get to do the job.

The Vila raid and the Battle of Blackett Strait evoked the praise of Admiral Chester W. Nimitz, who with glowing understatement called the exploit a "creditable performance." Nimitz cited the exemplary way in which TF 68 had picked up two enemy ships by radar, despite a close by land background; promptly obtained a fire control set-up, sank the enemy vessels in a "businesslike manner" and then proceeded to conduct their planned bombardment mission approximately on schedule. "The Operation had all the precision of a well-rehearsed exercise by veteran ships—which these were not."

Waller continued her operations in the Solomons through the end of 1943 and into 1944. As the Japanese sought to resupply their trapped garrisons on islands like Vella Lavella, Arundel, and Kolombangara, they utilized destroyers as transports and supply ships in what became known as the "Tokyo Express". These ships clashed with American cruisers and destroyers in a series of sharp, bitter night actions.

The Americans, meanwhile, kept up the pressure on the Japanese, subjecting their islands to nearly continual harassment from the sea and from the air. On the night of 29–30 June 1943, Waller, in company with three other destroyers and four cruisers, bombarded Vila-Stanmore plantation, Kolombangara, and the Shortland Islands. Much of the firing was done in the teeth of a driving rainstorm which obscured visibility and precluded claims of damage to Japanese installations.

=== Kula Gulf, July 1943 ===
Soon thereafter, on 6 July, a task group of three cruisers and four destroyers under Rear Admiral W. L. "Pug" Ainsworth, tangled with 10 Japanese destroyers carrying troops and supplies to Kolombangara in the Battle of Kula Gulf. In the fierce night action, two Japanese destroyers, Niizuki and Nagatsuki, were sunk as was Helena (CL-50) which fell victim to the dreaded "Long Lance" torpedoes.

During efforts to save the surviving crew of Helena, Waller served in the force covering Woodworth (DD-460) and Gwin (DD-433) which were engaged in the primary rescue operations. Waller detected a submarine by her radar and went in to try to seek out the enemy craft. A three-hour search netted a contact, and Waller dropped depth charges. Although the destroyer found no visible evidence that she had scored a kill, the commander of Task Group 36.2 (TG 36.2), Rear Admiral Aaron S. "Tip" Merrill, commented that the probability of the submarine's destruction was good endorsement to Waller's action report.

=== Mistaken identity ===
The warship continued supporting operations in the Solomons by escorting troop and supply convoys. While screening TG 31.2—four destroyers and four fast transports (APDs) bound for Enogai Inlet, New Georgia—a search plane picked up what looked like four enemy ships near Kolombangara Island and radioed a contact report. Waller, as part of the covering force, changed course to intercept and soon sighted three ships lying low off the jungle coastline.

Unbeknownst to Waller, these three "enemy" ships were, in reality, PT-157, PT-159, and PT-160, out on patrol, having unintentionally strayed north of their assigned patrol area. Waller, tracking as best she could opened fire at 20,000 yards, and other ships in company reported that she straddled and hit the "enemy". However, she had not. The PT boats, suddenly thrown into a bad situation, loosed torpedoes at the attacking "enemy" and sped off to the southward. Waller and her mates did not pursue the fleeing "enemy" but broke off action and returned to their duties covering the departing APDs, apparently satisfied that one had made a hit on the "Japanese destroyer". In the subsequent action report written up on 29 July, Waller's commanding officer wrote: "It has since been learned that these ships were probably our own PT boats."

=== Vela Lavella, August 1943 ===
No such case of mistaken identity occurred in Waller's operations on 15 August, while covering the landings at Vella Lavella. At 08:00, approximately 10 Japanese dive bombers appeared on the destroyer's radar, 38 miles distant. She fired an umbrella barrage at the approaching enemy to keep the attackers at "arm's length" and claimed two "Vals."

Later in the day, Waller again battled persistent Japanese planes, picking up on her radar eight torpedo planes heading in at low level. Director-controlled gunfire from the main battery 5 inch spat out fiery steel at the incoming Nakajima B5N "Kates" but knocked none down.

On the evening of 17 August, a Japanese air attack caused Waller and Philip (DD-498) to collide while undertaking evasive action; and Waller eventually steamed out of the combat area to undergo needed repairs. However, in October, she was back in the thick of the fighting.

=== Solomons campaign, October 1943 – February 1944 ===
On the night of 1–2 October, Waller entered waters off Vella Lavella in an attempt to cut off the evacuation of Japanese troops from the island. Waller shot up six landing barges that night and four on the following, wreaking heavy destruction, along with her mates, on the smaller-sized "Tokyo Express". All told during this period, 46 enemy craft of this type met destruction at the hands of American destroyers, cruisers, and PT boats.

Waller continued her convoy escort and support functions into the fall months. On 17–18 November, as American forces pushed towards Bougainville, Waller screened the 5th echelon of transports and supply ships. The total American force consisting of six destroyers, eight APDs, a fleet tug, and eight LSTs was crossing Empress Augusta Bay, off the coast of Bougainville, when 10 Japanese torpedo planes swooped in low and fast at 03:00. The ships quickly put up a tremendous barrage of antiaircraft fire to discourage the Japanese attackers.

Flares and float lights dropped by the Japanese planes lit up the scene with an eerie light. Destroyer gunfire sent tracer streaks across the night sky, and one "Betty" spun into the sea off the port bow of Pringle (DD-477). Another attacker, roaring in low and fast at 03:30, flew into a veritable hail of flak and crashed, trailing flames into the sea astern of Conway (DD-507). The torpedoes launched by the doomed aircraft failed to hit their mark and sped off past the American ships. Two minutes later, however, another "Betty" drew blood from the American force by torpedoing McKean (APD-5), which later sank. When the smoke of battle had cleared, Waller picked up eight Japanese aviators.

The warship soon was back off Torokina, Bougainville, on the shore of Empress Augusta Bay, with the 7th echelon of support ships. On 23 November, she shelled Marine Island.

She and her sister ships bombarded enemy positions on Buka Island and in the Choiseul Bay area on 1 February 1944. At 06:25, enemy shore batteries on Buka opened fire on the American men-of-war. Waller immediately served up a round of return fire at the Japanese guns which silenced one enemy battery. About a fortnight later, during the Green Island invasion, the ship set out, in company with Saufley (DD-465), Renshaw (DD-499), and Philip, to bombard the Japanese radar station at Cape St. George and the Borpop and Namatanai airfields. However, inclement weather hampered the spotting of shot, and it was impossible to ascertain the effectiveness of the raid.

=== Marianas campaign, June – August 1944 ===
Meanwhile, the Allied war effort continued to gain momentum; and, in June, American forces struck at the Marianas. Waller, having sailed to the Hawaiian Islands for a rest period, departed Pearl Harbor and passed the 180th Meridian on 5 June 1944. She escorted TG 51.18 via Kwajalein to Saipan. TG 51.18, an expeditionary force reserve whose mission was to support the occupation of the Marianas was slated to land on whatever island the situation might dictate Saipan, Guam, or Tinian.

Saipan was designated its target, and Waller began to bombard Japanese positions on that island. On the evening of 18 June, the warship received orders to give fire support in two areas to assist the marines in repelling an enemy tank attack. At 17:55, in company with Pringle, she entered Magicienne Bay. Waller closed the beach to get a better view but was unable to distinguish any tanks—American or Japanese. At 17:58, all engines were stopped to give the watch a better look at the shore. Suddenly, three minutes later, enemy shore guns opened up on the two destroyers.

Waller and Pringle both leapt ahead at full speed, heading in an easterly direction as their funnels belched forth a large amount of oily, black smoke. Splashes from near misses rose on both sides of the ships as they disappeared into the thick, boiling smoke. Waller fired several salvoes in return; but, as her action report noted, "possibly the terrain favored the Japanese, and no good point of aim was offered the director pointer."

American forces returned to Guam in the summer of 1944, and Waller took part in these operations by serving as screening unit for the forces landing on the island. She then conducted fire support and screening missions off Tinian as that island fell to the American naval steamroller in August. Following these operations, the ship returned to the west coast for a refit which lasted through the early fall of 1944.

=== Philippines campaign, November 1944 – April 1945 ===
She joined the 7th Fleet on 27 November for operations in the Philippine Islands. Shortly after noon that day the Japanese seemingly celebrated Waller's return to the battle zones by launching a suicide-plane raid by 15 planes. During the fracas, Waller shot down one intruder and assisted in splashing another.

On the night of 27–28 November, the destroyer led the four ships of Destroyer Division 43 (DesDiv 43) in a night sweep into Ormoc Bay, preparatory to American landings there. Her mission was one of the first penetrations of these waters since the Americans had been forcibly ejected from the Philippines almost three years before. While bombarding Japanese troop concentrations, she kept on the lookout for whatever small Japanese coastal naval craft might be encountered. The ships poured shells onto the shores around the bay for an hour, before they proceeded into the Camotes Sea in search of shipping.

An Allied patrol plane radioed a message to the division noting that a surfaced Japanese submarine—later determined to be I-46—was south of Pacijan Island, heading for Ormoc Bay. The division reversed course to intercept; and, at 01:27, Waller's radar picked up the target just off the northeast coast of Ponson Island. Firing all batteries that would bear, the destroyer steamed directly for the submarine—passing the word to "stand by to ram." Countermanding this order at the last minute because the submarine looked like she was already severely damaged, Waller instead continued to pump 40-millimeter and 5 inch shellfire into the enemy submersible which attempted a weak and ineffective return fire with her deck guns. At 01:45, as Waller doubled back for a second pass, the submarine's bow rose up towards the sky; and she sank, stern first.

Waller remained in the Leyte Gulf area until 2 December, after making a second sweep into the Camotes Sea on the night of 29–30 November in search of a reported 10-ship Japanese convoy. While she found no trace of the convoy, she nevertheless located and smashed six enemy barges with gunfire. Also during the Ormoc Bay raids, the ship came under Japanese air attack on both Ormoc Bay excursions on one occasion, three bombs fell within a few hundred yards of the destroyer.

In mid-December, Waller participated in the invasion of Mindoro as a unit of the covering force of battleships, escort carriers, cruisers, and destroyers. On 15 December, this force repulsed a heavy kamikaze attack in the Sulu Sea. Waller again downed one and helped to destroy another Japanese attacker. One of the planes, a twin-engined "Betty," was attempting a suicide run on Waller before heavy antiaircraft fire splashed her.

Early in January 1945, Waller shifted the scene of her operations to Lingayen Gulf, as American forces were landing there. While thus engaged, she scored hits on two suicide boats and poured some 3,000 rounds of ammunition at both air and surface targets. While she did not down a single plane, she damaged a countless number at the height of the heavy Japanese suicide raids.

February and March 1945 again found Waller escorting and screening the vital Allied transports and cargo vessels. When American forces splashed ashore at Basilan, Waller was off the beaches as flagship of the task group and received additional fire-support assignments at Tawi Tawi and Jolo, in the Sulu Archipelago, during April.

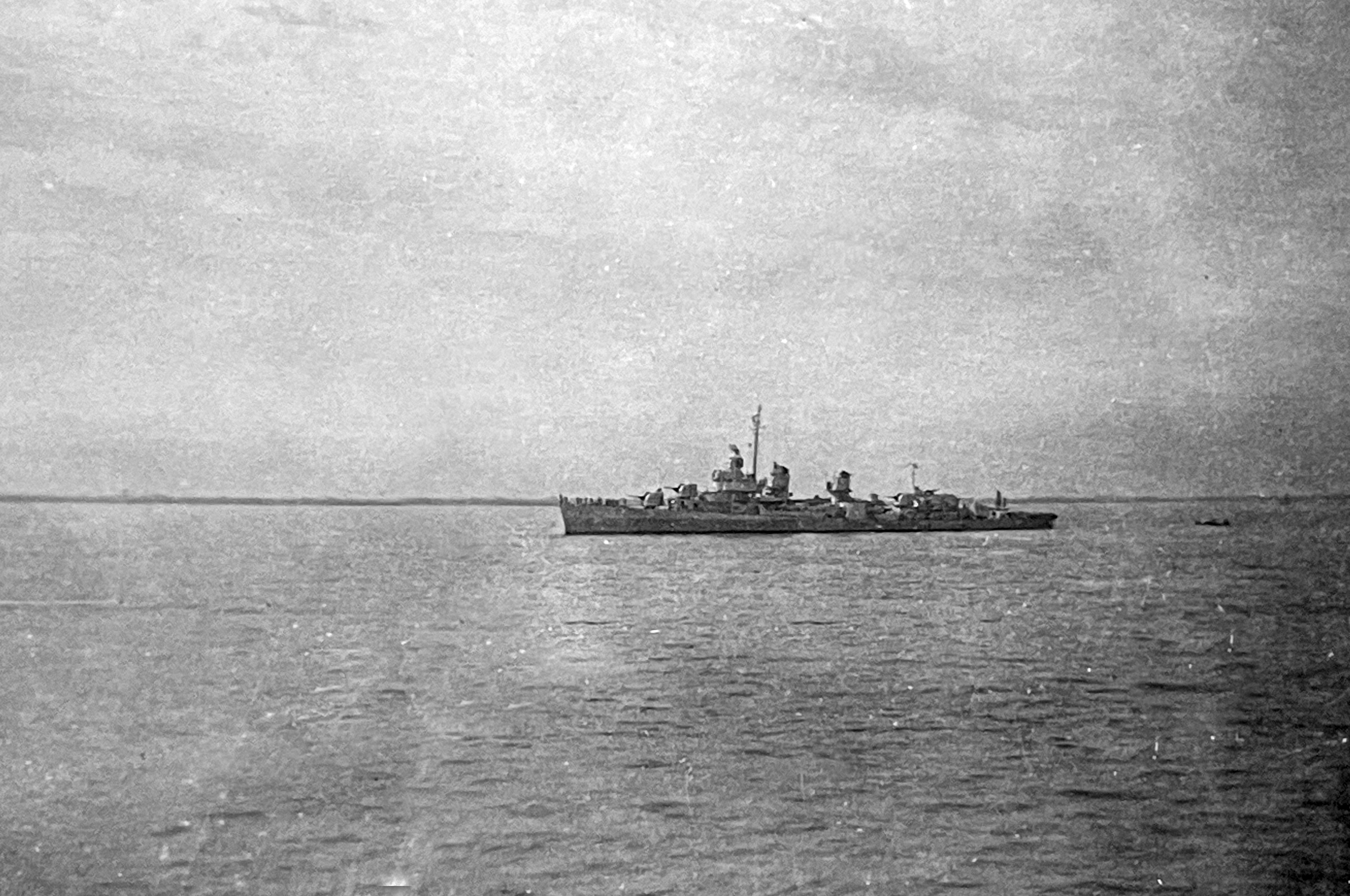
Waller in the Yangtze River outside Shanghai, 8 October 1945. Taken from USS Philip.

=== Indonesia and China, May – December 1945 ===
A joint Australian-American effort against Borneo kept Waller busy from May to July. Waller participated in this campaign by escorting convoys to Tarakan Island, Brunei Bay, and Balikpapan, as well as by covering minesweeping operations in the Miri-Lulong area, below Brunei Bay. She then rejoined the 3d Fleet early in August to be in readiness for the projected invasion of the Japanese home islands. But while en route toward Honshū, escorting a convoy, Waller received the most welcome news that the Japanese had accepted the unconditional surrender terms of the Potsdam Declaration.

Returned to the 7th Fleet once more, Waller entered Shanghai, China, on 19 September for a tour with the reconstituted Yangtze Patrol force and was one of the first American warships to make port at that Chinese city. A fortnight later, the destroyer neutralized a Japanese suicide-boat garrison base when a 21-man landing force from the ship assisted local Chinese authorities in disarming an estimated 2,700 Japanese at Tinghai.

While returning to Shanghai on 9 October, Waller fouled a Japanese-moored "Shanghai"-type contact mine. Three officers and 22 men were wounded, and the ship sustained enough structural damage to warrant a drydocking at Jiangnan Dock and Engineering Works at Shanghai. Following this period of repairs, the ship supervised minesweeping operations and supplied provisions and water to the ships engaged in the sweeps which netted some 60 mines. In addition, she provided Yangtze pilots for incoming vessels and monitored all shipping traffic passing her patrol station in the Yangtze estuary. The ship departed Chinese waters on 12 December bound for the United States, and after a stop at Pearl Harbor arrived at San Diego 18 days later.

== Korean War – Vietnam War ==
Placed out of commission soon thereafter and attached to the 6th Naval District, Waller remained in reserve at Charleston, S.C., until the onset of the Korean War. Selected as one of the Fletcher-class units to be converted to escort destroyers, Waller was redesignated DDE-466 on 26 March 1949 and was recommissioned at Charleston on 5 July 1950. Following shakedown, she joined Escort Destroyer Squadron 2 as flagship on 28 January 1951.

On 14 May of that year, Waller headed west to participate in the Korean War and, upon arrival near the "Land of the Morning Calm", immediately joined Task Force 95 (TF 95) as it was proceeding to Wonsan harbor. For 10 days, she fired shore bombardment missions against North Korean targets, hurling some 1,700 rounds of 5 inch shells on enemy positions. During the following summer, the destroyer acted as an escort for 7th Fleet units exercising in waters off Okinawa before returning to the seaborne blockade lanes in October 1951 for a two-week tour of duty before again returning to the United States.

From 1951 to late 1956, Waller participated in many Antisubmarine warfare (ASW) exercises off the east coast and made two extensive deployments to the Mediterranean Sea and two to the Caribbean. She entered the Norfolk Naval Shipyard late in 1956 and was again modified—this time with extensive alterations in her ASW battery. She rejoined the Fleet soon thereafter and, after a Mediterranean deployment in 1957, joined Destroyer Squadron 28 (DesRon 28), as a unit of ASW Task Force Alfa.

Her classification reverted to DD-466, 30 June 1962. Subsequently, joining DesRon 36 on 1 July 1964 Waller made numerous Mediterranean deployments over the next four years. On 6 September 1968, the destroyer departed Norfolk with DesDiv 362 for Vietnamese waters. Arriving in October, she reported immediately to the "gunline" and took up patrol duties on Yankee Station in the Gulf of Tonkin, off Qui Nhon, South Vietnam.

Supporting Korean troops, her 5-inch gunfire did extensive damage to Viet Cong bunkers and storage areas, before she moved south to a station off Phan Thiet where she supported the U.S. Army 173rd Airborne Brigade. During this deployment, she destroyed numerous Viet Cong structures rest camps and the like as well as interdicted the movement of Viet Cong supply traffic by destroying trails.

After having fired 2,400 rounds and completing her gunline assignment, Waller received a "well done" from Commander, Task Unit 70.8.9: "Waller's ability to meet all commitments is indeed noteworthy."

Proceeding to Yankee Station, Waller joined Intrepid (CVS-11) for attack carrier escort duties and upon this carrier's departure, joined Ranger (CVA-61) to conduct similar missions After 109 consecutive days of this duty, the veteran destroyer started for home on 2 March 1969. Although originally slated to become a Naval Reserve training ship on the east coast, after an extensive inspection Waller was decommissioned and struck from the Navy list on 15 July 1969. She was authorized to be disposed of, as a target, on 2 February 1970; she was sunk off Rhode Island, 17 June 1970.

== Honors ==
Waller received 12 battle stars for her World War II service and two each for Korean and Vietnam service. USS Waller also participated in the Cuban missile blockade in October 1962. The ship detected a Russian submarine and dropped a hand grenade over board to insist that it surface which it did.
