= USS Wachusett (1861) =

Gunboat of the United States Navy

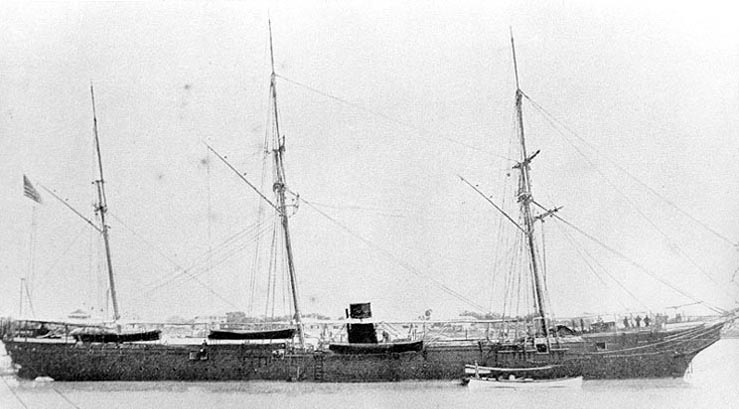

History

United States
- Name: USS Wachusett
- Namesake: Mount Wachusett, Massachusetts
- Laid down: June 1861 at the Boston Navy Yard
- Launched: 10 October 1861
- Commissioned: 3 March 1862
- Decommissioned: September 1885
- Fate: Sold 30 July 1887

General characteristics
- Type: Sloop-of-war
- Displacement: 1,032 tons
- Length: 201 ft 4 in (61.37 m)
- Beam: 33 ft 11 in (10.34 m)
- Draft: 14 ft (4.3 m)
- Depth of hold: 16 ft (4.9 m)
- Propulsion: sail and steam engine backup
- Speed: 11.5 knots (21.3 km/h; 13.2 mph)
- Armament: two 30-pounder Parrott rifles; one 20-pounder Parrott rifle; four 32-pounder guns; one 12-pounder rifle; two 11-inch Dahlgren smoothbores

USS Wachusett – the first United States Navy ship to be so named – was a large (1,032-ton), Mohican-class steam sloop-of-war that served the United States Navy during the American Civil War. She was outfitted as a gunboat and used by the Navy as part of the Union blockade of the Confederate States of America.

When the war was over, Wachusett continued to serve the Navy, protecting American interests in both the Atlantic Ocean as well as the Pacific Ocean until she was finally decommissioned.

== Service history ==
Wachusett—one of seven screw sloops-of-war authorized by the U.S. Congress in February 1861—was laid down by the Boston Navy Yard, Boston, Massachusetts, in June 1861; launched on 10 October; sponsored by Miss Mary C. Frothingham; and commissioned at the Boston Navy Yard on 3 March 1862, Comdr. John S. Missroon in command.

=== Civil War service ===
Wachusett's long career began on 10 March 1862 with her assignment to the North Atlantic Blockading Squadron. The warship left Boston two days later and arrived in Hampton Roads, Virginia, on the 16th. She was deployed in the York and James Rivers, Virginia, and performed service in support of Major General George B. McClellan's Peninsular Campaign of spring, 1862. On 4 May, a boat crew from Wachusett raised the Stars and Stripes at Gloucester Point, Virginia, following the Union occupation of Yorktown, Virginia; and, on the 6th and 7th, the vessel helped to land troops at West Point, Virginia, in the face of Confederate shore fire. Soon thereafter, the screw sloop moved to the James and, on the 15th, participated in the attack on Fort Darling, Drewry's Bluff, Virginia. She remained in the York and James rivers through August and later served with the Potomac Flotilla as Commodore Charles Wilkes' flagship from 29 August to 7 September.

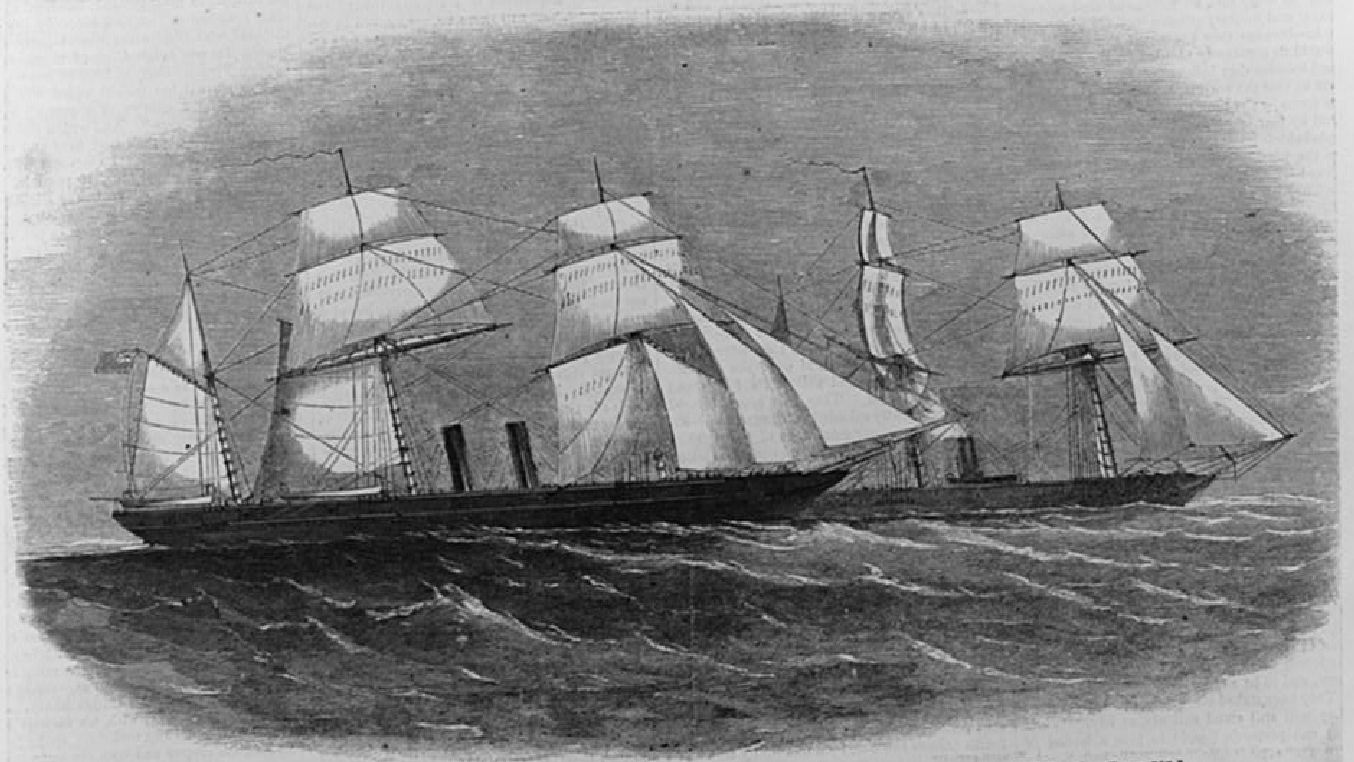
The capture as illustrated in Harper's Weekly.

On 8 September, Wachusett was designated flagship of a special "Flying Squadron" under Commodore Wilkes. This squadron of seven vessels was deployed in the West Indies with orders to search for the destructive and elusive Confederate commerce raiders CSS Alabama and Florida. On 18 January 1863, Wachusett and USS Sonoma captured the Southern merchant steamer Virginia off Isla Mujeres and took the British blockade runner Dolphin between Puerto Rico and St. Thomas Island on 25 March. However, all efforts to track down Alabama and Florida failed; and Wachusett returned to Boston, Massachusetts, in May for badly needed repairs. She was later decommissioned at the Philadelphia Navy Yard on 19 June 1863. Repairs completed, Wachusett was recommissioned on 28 January 1864. On 4 February, she sailed for the coast of Brazil to protect American commerce from the Confederacy's "piratical cruisers," particularly Alabama and Florida. Many months passed tracking down fruitless leads as to the whereabouts of the two vessels.

Finally, on 4 October, Comdr. Napoleon Collins of Wachusett sighted Florida, Lt. Charles Manigault Morris, CSN, entering Bahia harbor, Brazil. Comdr. Collins dared Lt. Morris to come out and fight, but the Confederate captain prudently declined. However, Collins was determined not to allow Florida to slip away. In the early morning darkness of the 7th, Wachusett got underway, steamed past the Brazilian gunboat anchored between his ship and Florida, and rammed the raider on her starboard quarter. After a brief exchange of cannon fire, Lt. Porter, commanding Florida in Morris's absence, surrendered the ship. Aroused by the commotion, the Brazilian coastal fort at Bahia opened fire on Wachusett as she towed her prize to sea. The two vessels escaped unscathed, steamed north, and reached Hampton Roads, Virginia, on 11 November. Commander Collins was promptly court-martialed for the Bahia incident, but soon after was restored to his command by U.S. Secretary of the Navy Gideon Welles.

=== Post-Civil War service ===
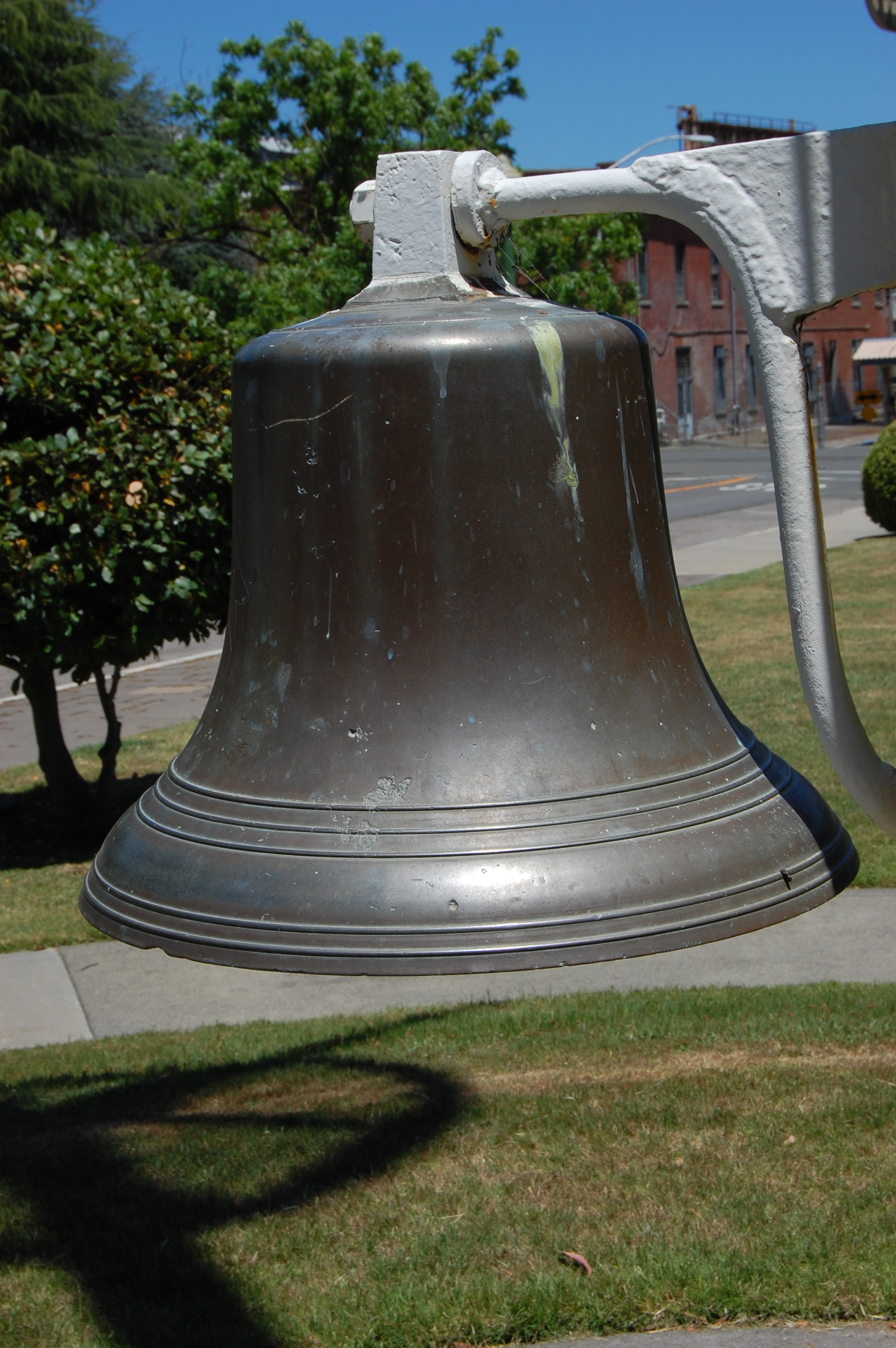
USS Wachusett bell, Mare Island Naval Shipyard.

After undergoing repairs at the Boston Navy Yard, Wachusett, under its new captain, Commander Robert Townsend, got underway on 5 March 1865 and sailed, via the Cape of Good Hope, for the East Indies. There, she joined Wyoming and Iroquois in an effort to track down the Confederate commerce raider CSS Shenandoah. While in China the ship was engaged in efforts to track down outlaws and pirates who were harming American interests. In mid-August the ship sailed up the Yangtze River in this mission. The heat was reportedly 107 degrees Fahrenheit (42 °C) in the shade and the ship made difficult passage up the river. A number of cases of heat stroke, some of them fatal, occurred. At 1:45 am on 15 August 1866, Robert Townsend died of heat stroke. The executive officer John Woodward (Jack) Philip, (later Admiral) assumed command of the Wachusett and sailed it downriver with the goal of making it to Japan for the health of the crew. That evening the ship anchored by the consulate in Shanghai and held a funeral for their commander. She remained in Chinese waters into 1867, when under Captain Robert W. Schufeldt she attempted to enter Korea in order to investigate the demise of the USS General Sherman. Upon her return to the United States, she was decommissioned on 4 February 1868 and was placed in ordinary at the New York Navy Yard.

Recommissioned on 1 June 1871, Wachusett left New York City a week later, bound for the Mediterranean where she cruised until November 1873. On 7 August 1872, Landsman Alexander Bradley jumped overboard to rescue another sailor from drowning, for which he was later awarded the Medal of Honor. Returning home, Wachusett served along the Atlantic and gulf coasts for a year before she was decommissioned at Boston on 29 December 1874. She remained laid up at Boston for five years and was recommissioned on 26 May 1879. She sailed for the Gulf of Mexico on 5 June and visited New Orleans, Louisiana, and Vicksburg, Mississippi, to enlist seamen before returning to Boston in August. On 2 October 1879, Wachusett left Boston for the South Atlantic Station where she cruised until May 1880. Following service in the Atlantic, Wachusett was transferred to the Pacific. In August 1881 Wachusett sailed to Sitka, Alaska and relieved USS Jamestown as the seat of government for the colonial Alaska District. Wachusett, with Alfred Thayer Mahan in command, was stationed at Callao, Peru, protecting American interests during the final stages of the War of the Pacific. The vessel remained on the Pacific Station, cruising extensively until September 1885 when she was decommissioned at the Mare Island Navy Yard, Vallejo, California. Wachusett was sold there to W. T. Garratt & Co. on 30 July 1887.
