= USS Philip (DD-498) =

Fletcher-class destroyer

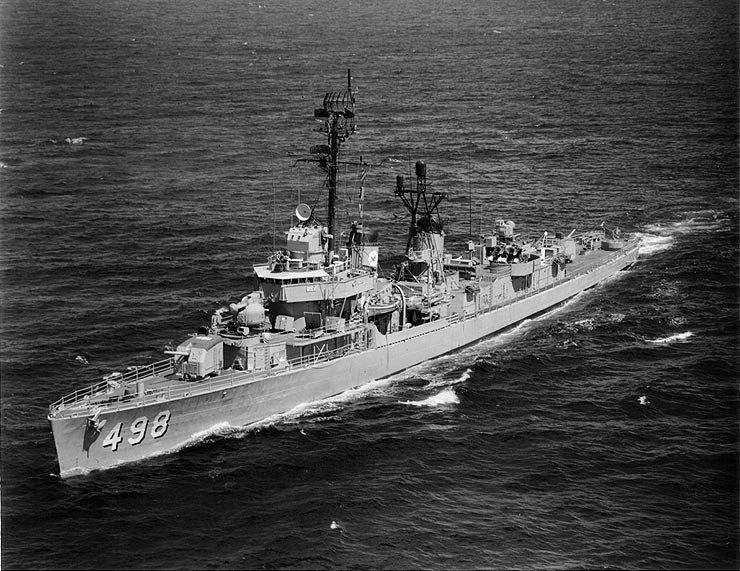
- USS Philip (DD-498) underway in the Pacific Ocean, 9 July 1968.

History

United States
- Name: USS Philip
- Namesake: John W. Philip
- Builder: Federal Shipbuilding and Drydock Company, Kearny, New Jersey
- Laid down: 7 May 1942
- Launched: 13 October 1942
- Commissioned: 21 November 1942
- Decommissioned: 30 September 1968
- Stricken: 1 October 1968
- Fate: Sank in a storm while under tow for scrapping, 2 February 1972.

General characteristics
- Class & type: Fletcher-class destroyer
- Displacement: 2,050 tons
- Length: 376 ft 6 in (114.7 m)
- Beam: 39 ft 8 in (12.1 m)
- Draft: 17 ft 9 in (5.4 m)
- Propulsion: 60,000 shp (45 MW); 2 propellers
- Speed: 35 knots (65 km/h; 40 mph)
- Range: 6500 nmi. (12,000 km) at 15 kt
- Complement: 336
- Armament: 5 × single Mk 12 5 in (127 mm)/38 guns; 5 × twin 40 mm (1.6 in) Bofors AA guns; 7 × single 20 mm (0.8 in) Oerlikon AA guns; 2 × quintuple 21 in (533 mm) torpedo tubes; 6 × single depth charge throwers; 2 × depth charge racks

USS Philip (DD/DDE-498), a Fletcher-class destroyer, was the second ship of the United States Navy to be named for Rear Admiral John W. Philip (1840–1900).

== Construction ==
Philip was laid down by the Federal Shipbuilding and Dry Dock Co., Kearny, New Jersey, 7 May 1942; launched 13 October 1942; sponsored by Mrs. Barrett Philip; and commissioned 21 November 1942. Among the junior officers at commissioning was Ensign Benjamin C. Bradlee, who later became executive editor of The Washington Post.

== Solomon Islands campaign: June 1943 – March 1944 ==
Philip's first mission came during the early morning of 30 June 1943 when she bombarded installations in the Shortland Islands area in the southwest Pacific. Operating in the screen of the Second Transport Group, Philip, on 15 August 1943, made a good showing in her first scrape with the enemy. Several bomb splashes were seen near Barakoma Beach, Vella Lavella, indicating that Japanese bombers were attacking the LCIs unloading there. A few minutes later, two dive bombers headed for Philip to unload their explosives. Each dropped a bomb, but both missed. The first aircraft, taken under fire by the ship's guns, kept getting closer until a friendly F4U Corsair took over the fight. Guns were shifted to the second and they soon shot it down.

Japanese aircraft came back for another attack at nightfall. Silhouetted clearly against a full moon, Philip was the most desirable target. One torpedo wake passed a few yards astern and another crossed parallel to the ship after it was seen in time to take evasive action. The ship's guns kept firing at one of the bombers, finally shooting it down.

Again during the next evening, Japanese aircraft made several attacks. This time, their objective proved to be the cumbersome LSTs withdrawing from Barakoma Beach. While laying a heavy smoke screen and shooting at the aircraft, Philip collided with Waller under the cover of her own smoke. Although damage to both vessels resulted, damage control parties of both ships rigged up shoring to prevent flooding and stayed in the battle. Philip kept her guns firing at the Japanese aircraft, one was shot down and another was claimed as a possible kill.

The Japanese continued to press their attacks in an attempt to dislodge American forces from their toehold on the Solomons. One aircraft released its torpedo and then flew between the ship's stacks and another was shot down, crashing into the sea 30 yards to port. A second attack brought another close call; two torpedoes dropped 15 yards astern. Philip's anti-aircraft guncrews shot down one of the torpedo bombers.

Two days later, while leading a convoy out of Tulagi, the destroyer launched a pair of attacks on what appeared to be a Japanese submarine, without damage to the enemy.

On 27 October, the destroyer fired at mortar emplacements on Mono Island and then came into Blanche Harbor, Treasury Island, Solomons. Six enemy Aichi D3A aircraft attempted to destroy the transports sitting there. The attack was repelled and Philip did her share by hitting one aircraft, which was seen to fly away in flames.

A barge sweep off Bougainville and bombardment of Choiseul Bay was conducted on 8 January 1944; ten days later, the destroyer returned for gunnery support on Bougainville, raking the island's northeast shores with surface fire.

Leading a convoy of LCIs into Bougainville on 15 February, Philip weathered a bombing attack similar to earlier actions; but retaliated in like manner, damaging one aircraft and repelling the others.

After a bombardment of Empress Augusta Bay 14 March, Philip left to take part in the Marianas campaign. From 17 June to the end of July, the destroyer's guns were in use almost daily against enemy positions on Saipan and Tinian. Known gun emplacements, troop concentrations, and air fields were the main targets, although several smaller engagements were performed at small craft in Tinian and boats in Tanapag Harbor.

== Philippines campaign, December 1944 – April 1945 ==
The Philippines came next. An assault on Mindoro, 12–15 December, was her initial step. One airplane was damaged in the battle. More fierce airplane attacks came when Philip joined a screening force around a resupply echelon traveling from Leyte to Mindoro, later that month. Frequent raids with coordinated bombing and suicide attacks by as many as six planes at one time greeted the slow convoy during its entire trip. Two of the attackers were shot down by the destroyer and another was damaged. A 20-millimeter shell, fired by an LCT at a Japanese plane, landed upon the aluminum spray shield on the ship's starboard bridge wing, tearing a hole in the structure and wounding two men. One of the wounded men died five hours after the accident.

Many of the ships were not as fortunate as Philip, which escaped with comparatively little damage. Kamikaze aircraft struck many of the less maneuverable merchant ships.

When Gansevoort received a hit from a kamikaze Philip assisted with two of her men, acting upon their own initiative, boarding the crippled destroyer, setting her depth charges on safe, and jettisoning them.

Steaming out of Leyte 5 January 1945, Philip sailed to join a task group which went on to invade Lingayen Gulf, Luzon Island, Philippines, 9 January. The destroyer remained in the area until 12 January, screening the transports as they unloaded. Several air attacks and suicide boat assaults were encountered during the journey from Leyte.

During the early morning of 10 January, the destroyer challenged a small boat which it picked up on radar. The small craft, acting queerly, did not reply. After illuminating the small explosive-laden boat, Philip opened with its 20-millimeter and .45 sub-machine guns. The boat turned sharply, headed directly for the ship's port side amidships but was exploded 20 yards short of her mark.

Two brief fire support missions were conducted in the occupation of Zamboanga Peninsula, Mindanao, during March, and assaults on Sanga-Sanga and Jolo Islands, Sulu Archipelago, Philippines, were successfully conducted by Philip during 2–10 April.

== Borneo campaign, April – July 1945 ==
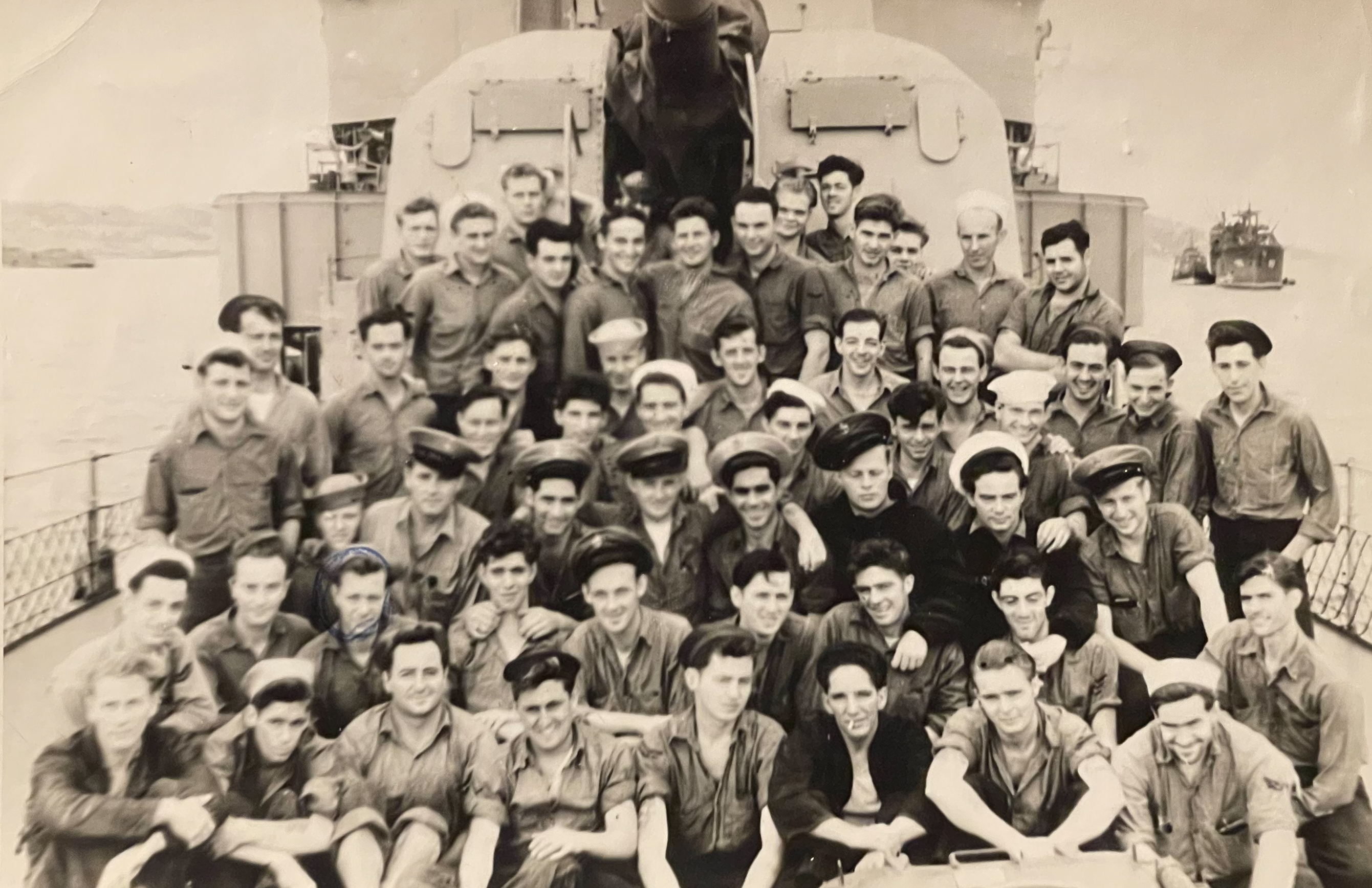
Original crew of the USS Philip in 1945

On 30 April, the destroyer joined a special attack unit to transport, protect, and establish units of the 26th Australian Brigade on Sauau, Borneo, N.E.I. Major landings on Tarakan Island followed a day later; enemy opposition in force was surprisingly absent.

Relieved of radar picket duty off Brunei Bay on 12 June, Philip rendezvoused with a minesweeping group and left to clear the area of Miri-Luton, Sarawak, Borneo, in preparation for an assault which was to come seven days later.

Having previously paved the way for an assault landing on Brunei Bay, Borneo, Philip covered the "sweeps" while preparations were made for the next invasion. A total of 246 mines were cut loose from the heavily planted area, not without loss of much valuable sweep gear. Hostile gun positions in the Miri area were softened by the destroyer while the minesweepers performed their chores.

Elements of the First Australian Corps, loaded at Morotai, landed at Balikpapan, Borneo, 1 July, while Philip stood guard for enemy attempts to hinder the invasion. Remaining in the area until 19 July, the destroyer bombarded the surrounding shores and helped repel such feeble air attacks as the Japanese could muster.

The end of the war followed the Borneo operation, but it did not bring about immediate return to the United States for the busy destroyer. She was sent to China on mine destruction duty and remained in the Pacific area until late in 1945.

The veteran destroyer got back to the West Coast just in time to allow the crew to spend New Year's Eve on home soil. She subsequently sailed to the Atlantic and, by Directive dated January 1947, was placed out of commission, in reserve, attached to the U.S. Atlantic Reserve Fleet, berthed at Charleston, South Carolina

Philip's classification was changed to DDE-498 on 26 March 1949.

== Korean War, 1950 – 1954 ==
Philip recommissioned at Charleston, South Carolina 30 June 1950, and sailed to the Panama Canal Zone and San Diego en route to her new home port, Pearl Harbor. Here she arrived 10 September 1950, and immediately assumed her part in advanced hunter-killer exercises. During the autumn of 1950, Philip acted as plane-guard for the aircraft bearing President Harry S. Truman to his mid-ocean conference with General Douglas MacArthur on Wake Island, to discuss the conduct of the Korean War.

Philip departed Pearl Harbor 1 June 1951 for Midway and Yokosuka, Japan. On 15 June, she joined Task Force 77 (TF 77) in the Sea of Japan for duty screening the fast carrier task force as it conducted air operations against enemy forces in North Korea. She returned to Japan for anti-submarine warfare exercises from 30 June to 10 July, and next day sailed for Taiwan and duty on patrol in the Taiwan Straits. A visit to Hong Kong which began 29 July was interrupted by Typhoon Louise. Through August, Philip continued her patrol duties, and early in September conducted anti-submarine exercises off Okinawa until 11 September when she put into Yokosuka for upkeep.

On 24 September 1951 Philip was bound for the east coast of Korea. Here she had escort duty with TF 77 until 3 October, when she received orders which sent her to duty on the west coast of Korea with the United Nations Naval Forces which included Australian and British units. Here Philip screened the carrier group, and served to enforce the naval blockade on the 38th parallel.

Fighting her way through the most devastating typhoon in years, Ruth, Philip steamed back to duty with TF 77, joining up 15 October. Released from this duty 31 October. Philip proceeded to Yokosuka, and departed 2 November for Pearl Harbor.

On arriving at Pearl Harbor, the ship commenced a yard period, which was followed by a period of refresher training. Underway training and plane guard duty continued until 27 October 1952, when Philip began a short drydock period, part of her preparation for another tour of duty in the Korean War. She departed Pearl Harbor 10 November, bound for Yokosuka, Japan, where she arrived ten days later.

Late in the afternoon of 25 November 1952 Philip joined Task Force 78, and began duty in the screen of the task force. Later duty included a shore bombardment patrol in company with Los Angeles in the vicinity of latitude 38'30'N off the east coast of Korea. On 5 December, the two vessels entered Wonsan Harbor to fire on shore targets, and then returned to the bombline to carry out call fire missions. Steady steaming with TF-78 was resumed from 8 December until 27 December, interrupted only by a night search for a sonar contact and two rescue missions for pilots of downed aircraft. After a period of tender availability in Yokosuka, Philip resumed similar duty until May 1953.

Philip returned to Pearl Harbor 29 May 1953, and operated for a month in training exercises. Late in June she began an intensive three-month overhaul at Pearl Harbor Naval Shipyard. Overhaul completed, she returned to a busy schedule of operations in the Hawaiian group which included search and rescue missions, anti-submarine exercises, practice shore bombardment, and carrier plane guard duties.

A major fleet exercise occupied Philip during the first months of 1954, and she then began preparations for another journey to the Western Pacific. On 14 June, she stood out for Yokosuka, Japan, where she arrived 23 June, mooring alongside Hamul for two days of tender availability. Philip then got underway for the Shimonoseki Straits and Chinhae, Korea. After reporting for duty with Task Force 95, Philip steamed to Inchon to join HMS Warrior and act as plane guard for the British carrier on the United Nations Blockade. Philip escorted Warrior to Kure, Japan, 4 July, and sailed on to Sasebo for a week's restricted availability.

== 1954 – 1957 ==
After further service in Korean waters, Philip left Japan for Pearl Harbor, arriving home 29 August 1954 for a month's overhaul, She resumed operations in the Hawaiian Islands until 15 March 1955, when she entered the yard for a comprehensive overhaul. Overhaul was followed by refresher training and preparation for another Far Eastern deployment. On 8 August 1955, she sailed for Yokosuka, Japan, arriving ten days later. On this tour of duty, she participated in large scale antisubmarine warfare exercises off Okinawa, operated with Task Force 77, and served on the Taiwan Patrol before heading for home 6 January 1956.

Operations in Hawaiian waters occupied Philip between 15 January 1956, and 30 October when she once more took departure for the Far East. Serving primarily in Japanese waters, Philip completed a shorter tour than previously, and was back home in Pearl Harbor 22 January 1957.

== 1957 – 1968 ==
During 1957, she joined Destroyer Squadron 25, unique in its three divisions, rather than the usual two. The escort destroyers of Destroyer Squadron 25 were so deployed that one division of the three was in the Far East at any given time, and it was on this schedule that Philip once more sailed for the Orient 27 December.

Arriving in Yokosuka 5 January 1958 Philip served on exercises off Japan and Okinawa, in the Philippine Islands, and in the South China Sea until 23 April, when her division began the homeward bound voyage, by an unusual route. Arriving in Brisbane, Australia 2 May, Philip visited Melbourne and Sydney, Australia; Wellington, New Zealand; and Pago Pago, American Samoa, before returning to Pearl Harbor 29 May. Here she resumed her operations in the Hawaiian Group throughout the remainder of 1958.

From the latter part of June 1958 until the end of January 1959, Philip took part in hunter-killer operations, conducted shore bombardment, air, and surface shoots, single and dual ship antisubmarine exercises, and fulfilled the duties of plane guard destroyer for the super carrier Ranger. On 18 February, Philip and the other escort destroyers of DesDiv 252 got underway and proceeded to Yokosuka, Japan. Philip operated around Japan and in the South China Sea before arriving Brisbane, Australia, 11 July. The deployment ended at Pearl Harbor 30 July.

The division sailed from Honolulu again for Yokosuka 22 April 1960. After operating in the waters of Japan and Okinawa Philip returned to Pearl Harbor 29 October 1960. On 4 February 1962 Philip was off for Yokosuka again. This cruise was spent in the waters of Japan, the Philippines, and Vietnam. Effective 1 July 1962 Philip was redesignated from DDE to DD. Philip returned to Pearl Harbor 18 July 1962.

On 3 October 1962, "Philip' operated with the Essex Class carrier USS Kearsarge CVS-33 (primary recovery ship) in the recovery of astronaut Wally Schirra who flew aboard the Mercury – Atlas 8 mission who splashed down in the Pacific at 32°07'30"N, 174°45'W.

Philip steamed again for Yokosuka 12 November 1963, operating again in Japanese, Philippine, and Vietnamese waters, and returning to Pearl Harbor 10 April 1964. After another period of operations out of Hawaii, Philip steamed for Yokosuka again 19 April 1965. This cruise was highlighted by duty on Yankee Station off Vietnam and by patrol of the Taiwan straits. She returned home 1 October 1965.

The USS Philip was featured in the 1965 Otto Preminger film In Harm's Way starring John Wayne. It makes its appearance as the fictitious destroyer USS Cassiday (with an altered hull number of DD 298) that steams out of Pearl Harbor at the beginning of the 7 December 1941 attack, joins up with the Wayne character's cruiser in an ad hoc task group, depth charges a Japanese submarine that attacks the task group, and pulls alongside the Wayne character's cruiser to render aid after it has been torpedoed by the same Japanese submarine.

Philip was decommissioned 30 September 1968 and struck from the Navy List on 1 October 1968. She was sold 15 December 1971 but sank in a storm on her way to be scrapped 2 February 1972.

Philip received nine battle stars for World War II service and five battle stars for Korean War service.
