= James Orton Woodruff =

American engineer (1840–1879)

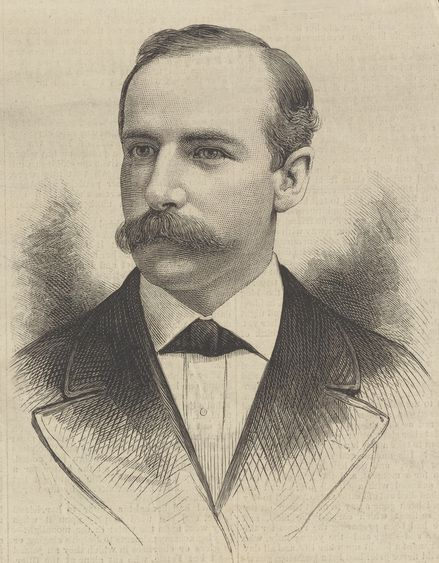
- Born: July 26, 1840; Auburn, New York
- Died: June 4, 1879; Indianapolis
- Occupation: Engineer
- Known for: Woodruff Place, Rubber Stamp

James Orton Woodruff (26 July 1840 – 4 June 1879) was an American engineer.

== Biography ==
Woodruff was born to Harmon J. Woodruff in Auburn, New York. In 1861 he joined the Union army at the outbreak of the American Civil War and before deploying he married Ermina Jane Adsit, daughter of Samuel Adsit. He reached the rank of First Lieutenant before he was forced to resign in 1863 due to ill-health.

Following the war he spent some time in New York and while there he saw the potential of using vulcanized rubber to set up letter molds. Eventually he was able to succeed with the help of his uncle, Urial D. Woodruff, who was familiar with the vulcanizers through his work as a dentist. As a result of this Woodruff is often credited as the inventor of the rubber stamp, however this claim is disputed.

He subsequently moved to Indianapolis where he proposed to the city council to install a system of water works. This resulted in the incorporation of the Water Works Company of Indianapolis which completed work on the water works in 1871.

After completion of the water works he purchased 77 acres of land and started the development of Woodruff Place, one of the first suburbs of Indianapolis, which he envisioned as an exclusive suburban town. The planning and construction of the development was started in 1872, however Woodruff was bankrupted by the Panic of 1873 which put an end to the development until new investors were able to take over the project.

Later in his life Woodruff planned the Woodruff Expedition Around the World, a round the world voyage for educational and scientific purposes taking teachers and students. It was originally scheduled as a two-year voyage departing in October 1877 with John W. Philip as the commanding officer, Daniel McCauley as Secretary and with a number of notable professors acting as academic faculty including W.L.B. Jenney, Fred E. Ives and Burt G. Wilder. This expedition was cancelled due to difficulties finding a suitable ship for an affordable price. Eventually a bill was passed in Congress to grant an American register to a foreign-built ship for the purpose of the expedition and an attempt was made to revive the expedition however with Woodruff's death put an end to the plans for the expedition.
