= USS Philip (DD-76) =

Wickes-class destroyer

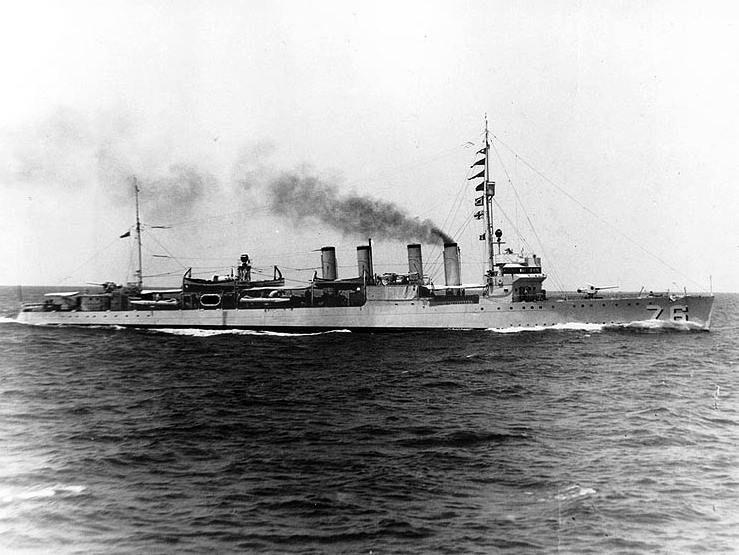
- USS Philip

History

United States
- Name: USS Philip
- Namesake: John Woodward Philip
- Builder: Bath Iron Works
- Laid down: 1 September 1917
- Launched: 25 July 1918
- Commissioned: 24 August 1918
- Decommissioned: 29 May 1922
- Recommissioned: 25 February 1930
- Decommissioned: 2 April 1937
- Recommissioned: 30 September 1939
- Stricken: 8 January 1941
- Fate: Transferred to United Kingdom 23 October 1940

United Kingdom
- Name: HMS Lancaster
- Commissioned: 23 October 1940
- Decommissioned: July 1945
- Fate: Scrapped in 1947

General characteristics
- Class & type: Wickes-class destroyer
- Displacement: 1090 tons (1107 tons)
- Length: 314 ft 4 in (95.81 m)
- Beam: 30 ft 6 in (9.30 m)
- Draft: 8 ft 8 in (2.64 m)
- Speed: 35 knots (65 km/h; 40 mph)
- Complement: 134 officers and enlisted
- Armament: 4 x 4 in (102 mm)/50 guns; 1 x 3 in (76 mm)/23 gun; 12 x 21 inch (533 mm) torpedo tubes

The first USS Philip (DD–76) was a Wickes-class destroyer in the United States Navy during World War I, later transferred to the Royal Navy as HMS Lancaster. She was named for John Woodward Philip.

== As USS Philip ==
Philip was laid down by the Bath Iron Works, Bath, Maine, 1 September 1917; launched 25 July 1918; sponsored by Mrs. Barrett P. Philip; and commissioned at the Boston Navy Yard 24 August 1918. The vessel was named for Admiral John Woodward Philip, captain of the battleship USS Texas during the blockade and battle of Santiago, Cuba in 1898.

After being fitted out at Boston, Philip reported to Commander Squadron Two, Cruiser Force, 1 September 1918, to escort convoy HX–47 across the Atlantic, returning from Buncrana, Ireland, under orders of Commander, U.S. Destroyer Forces operating in European waters. She was flagship of Submarine Hunting Group stationed at the Coast Guard Station, Cold Spring, Cape May, New Jersey, 28 September – 11 October. She steamed to Europe with convoy HX–54 which sailed 27 October but returned to New York, 20 November.

Philip supported the trans-Atlantic flight of the NC-1, NC-3, and NC-4, 11 – 19 May 1919. With other fleet units, she had a part in Army experimental firing at Fort Hancock, New York. She then had orders to duty with Squadron 4, Destroyer Force, Pacific Fleet, and reported at San Diego Destroyer Base 2 August. During the next month she cruised to Pearl Harbor, and thereafter took part in division maneuvers, fleet movements and tactical exercises, cruising the west coast of the United States, South America, and Panama Canal Zone, having special duty as assigned until 29 May 1922 when Philip was placed out of commission.

When recommissioned 25 February 1930, after her overhaul and reconditioning, Philip was attached to Destroyer Squadrons, Battle Fleet, and conducted maneuvers and gunnery practice for the Reserve Force in the San Diego area. On 3 November she arrived at Corinto, Nicaragua, en route to the East Coast to join the Training Squadron, arriving New York Navy Yard 6 December. For the instruction of NROTC classes in the year 1931, she made many departures from Staten Island for the New England coast, Bermuda operating area, and Naval Operating Base, Hampton Roads, Tangier Sound and Quantico, Virginia, before returning to New York. On 22 December she departed New York to join the Special Service Squadron which operated in the vicinity of Panama, Nicaragua, and El Salvador, for the protection of American interests. Upon being detached Philip entered Mare Island Navy Yard, and from 9 May to 30 July 1932 operated in reduced commission with Destroyer Squadron 20, Rotating Reserve.

At her base in San Diego, from 18 August, Philip operated with Destroyer Division 6, Squadron 2, Battle Fleet, engaging in intensive division training, tactics and torpedo practice, at times operating with Aircraft Battle Force. From December 1933 to July 1934 she was in reduced status as before, later serving successively with Submarine Division 12 and with Cruisers Scouting Force, and with other destroyer divisions.

In July – August 1934 Philip visited Alaskan ports, and made preparations for the Presidential Fleet Review held at San Diego in September – October 1935. Among her many duties, Philip annually participated in fleet problems, engaged in squadron and fleet tactics, acting at times as plane guard for carriers.

She decommissioned at Destroyer Base, San Diego, 2 April 1937, and recommissioned 30 September 1939 for duty with Division 64, Atlantic Squadron, which operated on neutrality patrol in the vicinity of Key West, Florida. She arrived there 11 December, and early the next year as a unit of the Antilles Detachment, she visited Dutch Indies and Venezuelan ports, as well as Guantanamo Bay, Cuba, St. Eustatius, Dry Tortugas, San Juan, Puerto Rico, St. Thomas, Culebra Island, and acted as submarine escort to the Canal Zone.

== As HMS Lancaster ==
Departing Key West for New York Navy Yard 23 July 1940, she was overhauled and following trials arrived at Newport, Rhode Island, en route to Halifax, Nova Scotia. There she was decommissioned 23 October 1940 and turned over to British authorities in the ships for bases exchange, and renamed HMS Lancaster in the Royal Navy. Her name was struck from the Navy List 8 January 1941.

As Lancaster, she served as a convoy escort in the Royal Navy during World War II, and was reduced to reserve in July 1945.
