= USS Essex (1856) =

1000-ton ironclad river gunboat

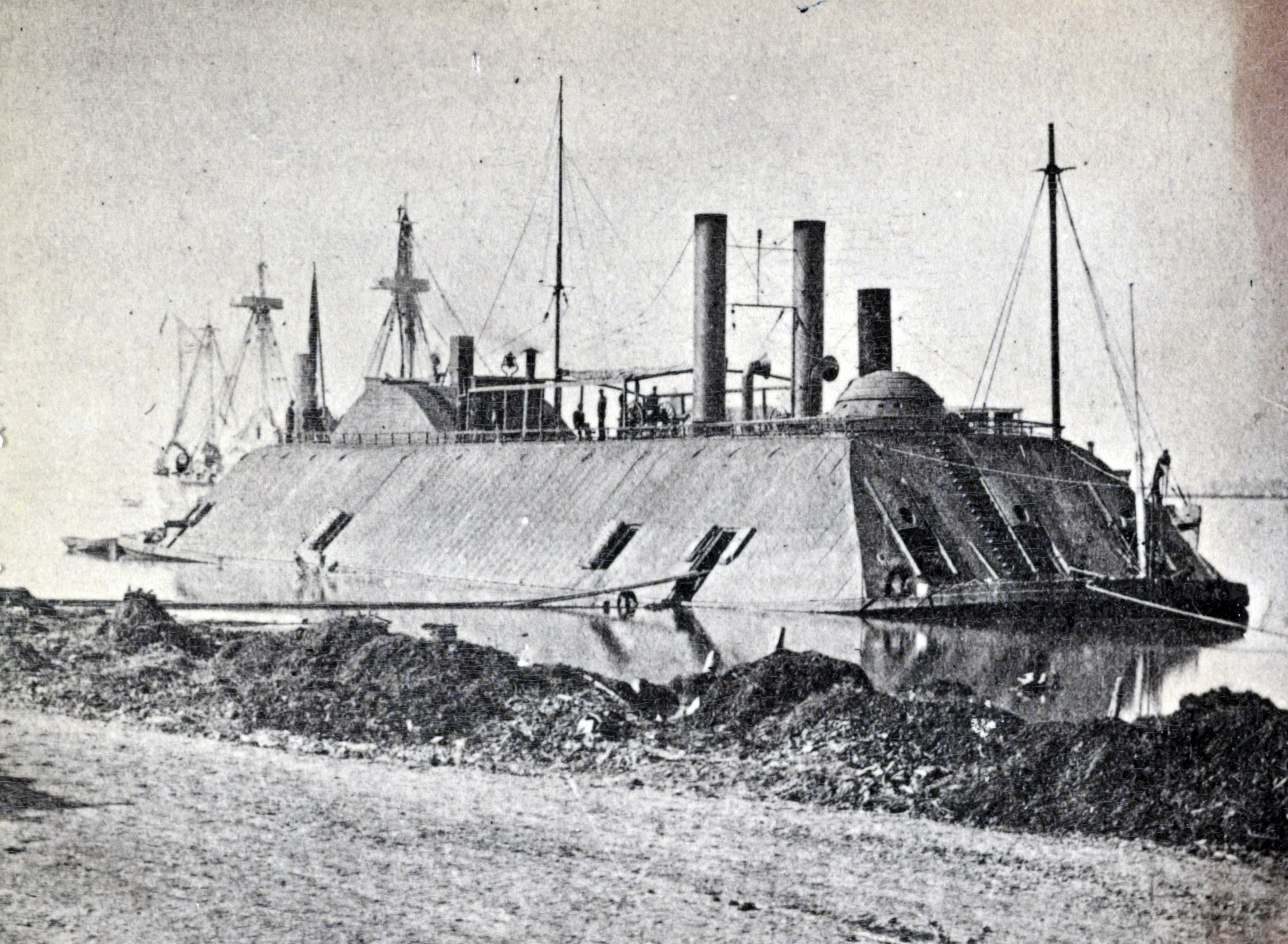
- Essex at Baton Rouge, Louisiana, July 1862

History

United States
- Name: New Era
- Launched: 1856
- Acquired: 20 September 1861
- Decommissioned: 20 July 1865
- Renamed: Essex in late 1861
- Refit: as an ironclad late 1861
- Fate: sold on 29 November 1865; scrapped 1870

General characteristics
- Type: Ironclad
- Displacement: 640 tons
- Length: 202 ft (62 m)
- Beam: 60 ft (18 m)
- Draft: 6 ft (1.8 m)
- Speed: 5.5 knots
- Complement: 124
- Armament: 1 × 32-pounder; 3 × 11-inch Dahlgren smooth bores;1 × 10-inch Dahlgren smoothbore;1 × 12-pounder howitzer
- Armor: 1 ¾" forward casemate, ¾" sides

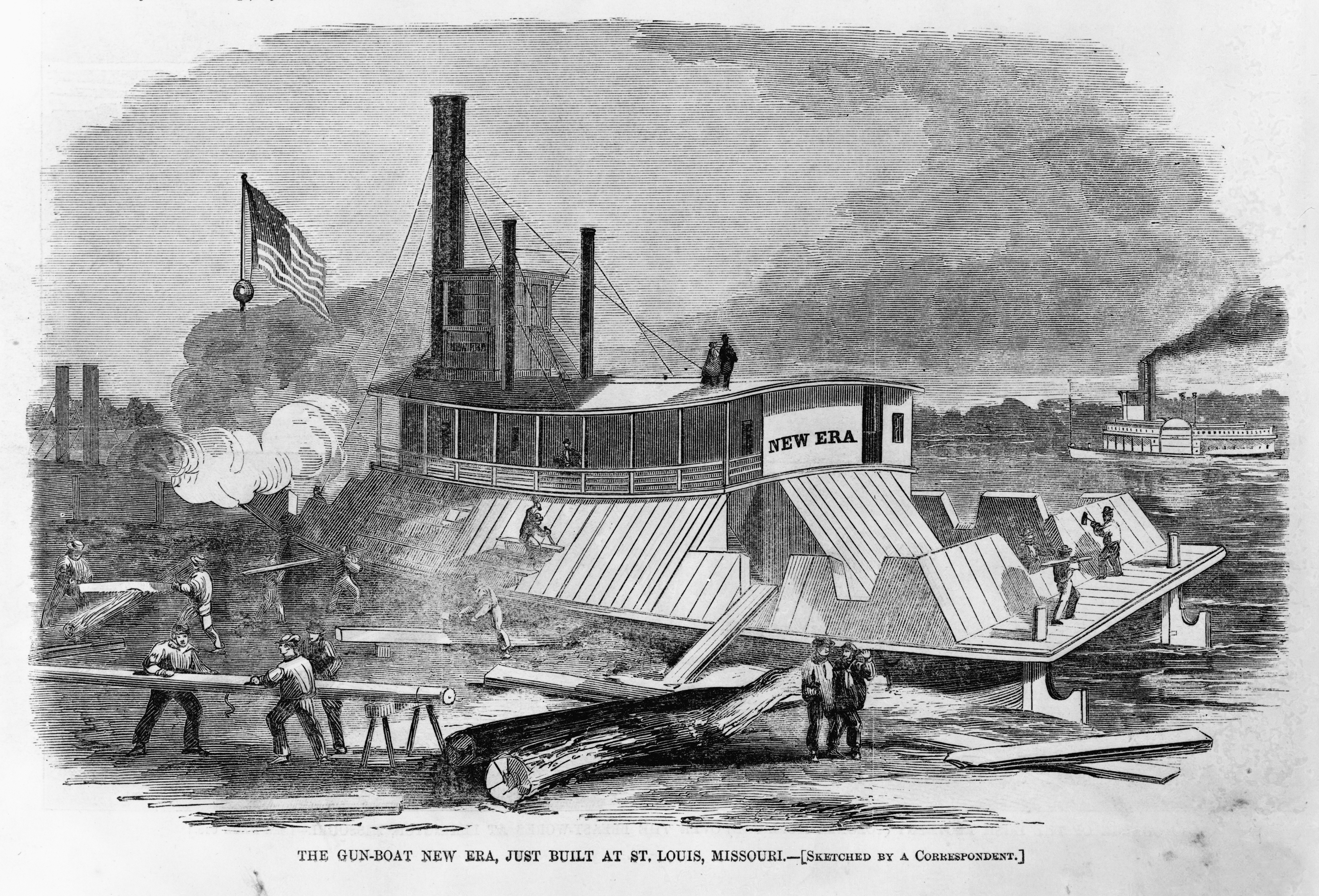
A contemporary illustration of the 1861 conversion of the steamer New Era into the gunboat USS Essex.

USS Essex was a 1000-ton ironclad river gunboat of the United States Army and later United States Navy during the American Civil War. It was named by her captain, William Porter, for his father's old sailing frigate, the USS Essex. This Essex was originally constructed in 1856 at New Albany, Indiana as a steam-powered ferry named New Era.

== Service in Tennessee ==
In September 1861 New Era was purchased by the United States Army for use in its Western Gunboat Flotilla and was modified into a 355-ton timberclad gunboat. In November 1861 USS New Era took part in an expedition up the Cumberland River. Shortly thereafter she was renamed USS Essex and received an upgrade to iron armor and various other alterations. On 11 January 1862, USS Essex engaged Confederate States Navy gunboats near Lucas Bend, Missouri. On 6 February 1862, she took part in the attack on Fort Henry, Tennessee and was badly damaged by Confederate gunfire.

== Battling the CSS Arkansas ==
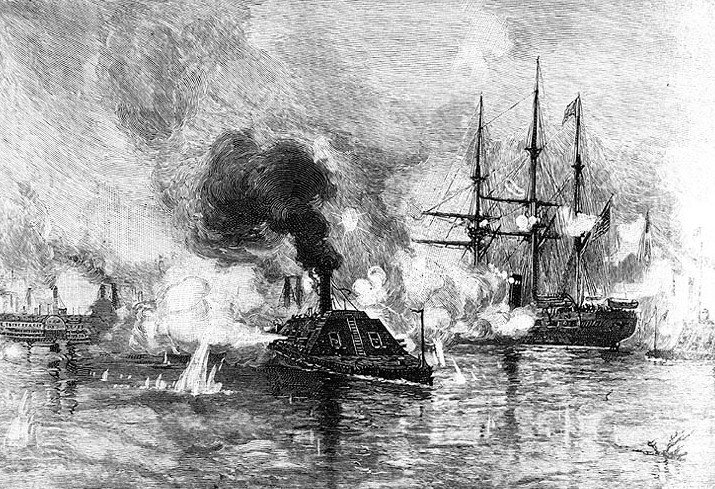
CSS Arkansas running through the Union fleet above Vicksburg, Mississippi, 15 July 1862

Commanding officer William D. Porter upgraded his ship without official authorization into an ironclad gunboat. Under his orders she was lengthened, widened, and completely reengineered, and her appearance was changed drastically. New, more powerful, engines were put in place and she was rearmored. After her upgrade Essex took part in operations near Vicksburg, Mississippi. On 15 July 1862, USS Essex was engaged with CSS Arkansas as that ship successfully ran past the Union fleets in front of the city. On 23 July, Essex unsuccessfully attacked the Arkansas at her moorings but was repelled by the Arkansas and the shore guns under whose protection the Arkansas lay. Federal forces withdrew from Vicksburg shortly thereafter. After withdrawing, Essex joined Admiral David Farragut's squadron and was the only Federal ironclad on the lower Mississippi River. On 5 August 1862, Essex helped repel a Confederate Army attack on Baton Rouge, Louisiana.

On 6 August, the Essex once again engaged CSS Arkansas as that vessel attempted to relieve the beleaguered Confederates attacking Baton Rouge. As Essex approached, the steering mechanism of the Arkansas jammed and her crew was forced to scuttle her due to the presence of the Essex.

== Transfer to the Navy ==
In October 1862 the Essex was transferred from the Army to the United States Navy. She was involved in the bombardment of Port Hudson, Louisiana and assisted during the occupation of Baton Rouge. In May–July 1863 under the command of Robert Townsend she participated in the siege and capture of Port Hudson. USS Essex took part in the Red River Campaign of March–May 1864.

In December 1864, the USS Essex was in Memphis, Tennessee. According to David Redrick, the Rear Admiral's cook, some of the boat's crew "slipped ashore at night" and "got on a spree". Boatswain William Bernard Dolen, age 33, was part of a detail sent ashore to "arrest the boys". During the arrest, he was stabbed in the right chest by a fellow seaman, and was honorably discharged for disability due to the chronicity of the wound, from which he later died in 1878.

== After the war ==
Essex was decommissioned in July 1865. She was sold in November 1865 and reverted to the civilian name New Era. She was scrapped in 1870. USS Essex had the reputation as one of the most active gunboats on the Mississippi River, despite her relatively weak armor. It often was damaged in actions.
