= Woodruff Place, Indianapolis =

- Woodruff Place
- U.S. National Register of Historic Places
- U.S. Historic district
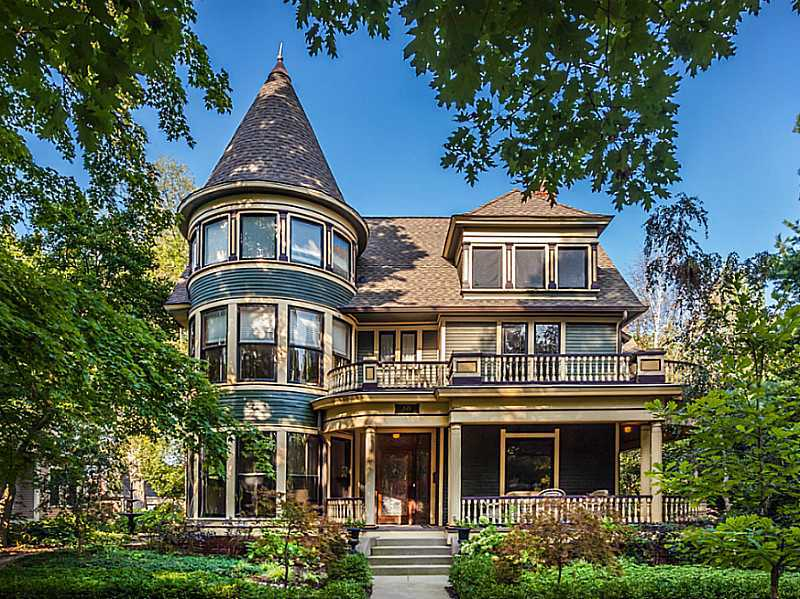
- A private residence in Woodruff Place

- Location within Indianapolis Location within Indiana Location within the United States
- Location: Indianapolis, Indiana
- Coordinates: 39°46′40″N 86°7′42.5″W
- Architectural style: Late 19th and 20th Century Revivals, Late Victorian
- NRHP reference No.: 72000012
- Added to NRHP: July 31, 1972

Woodruff Place is a neighborhood in Indianapolis, Indiana, located about a mile east of downtown Indianapolis. It was established in the 1870s by developer James O. Woodruff as an early suburb of Indianapolis. Woodruff Place's boundaries are: 10th Street on the north, Woodruff Place West Drive on the west, Michigan Street on the south, and Woodruff Place East Drive on the east. Woodruff Place was incorporated in 1876 and remained an independent town even as the city of Indianapolis grew and expanded around it, enclosing the community well within the city limits. In 1962, it became one of the final municipalities to be annexed by the city of Indianapolis prior to the merger of city and county governments under Unigov in 1969.

Woodruff Place is bounded on the west by the campus of Arsenal Technical High School, which opened in 1912 on the site of the former Indianapolis Arsenal and still uses several historic buildings from the arsenal.

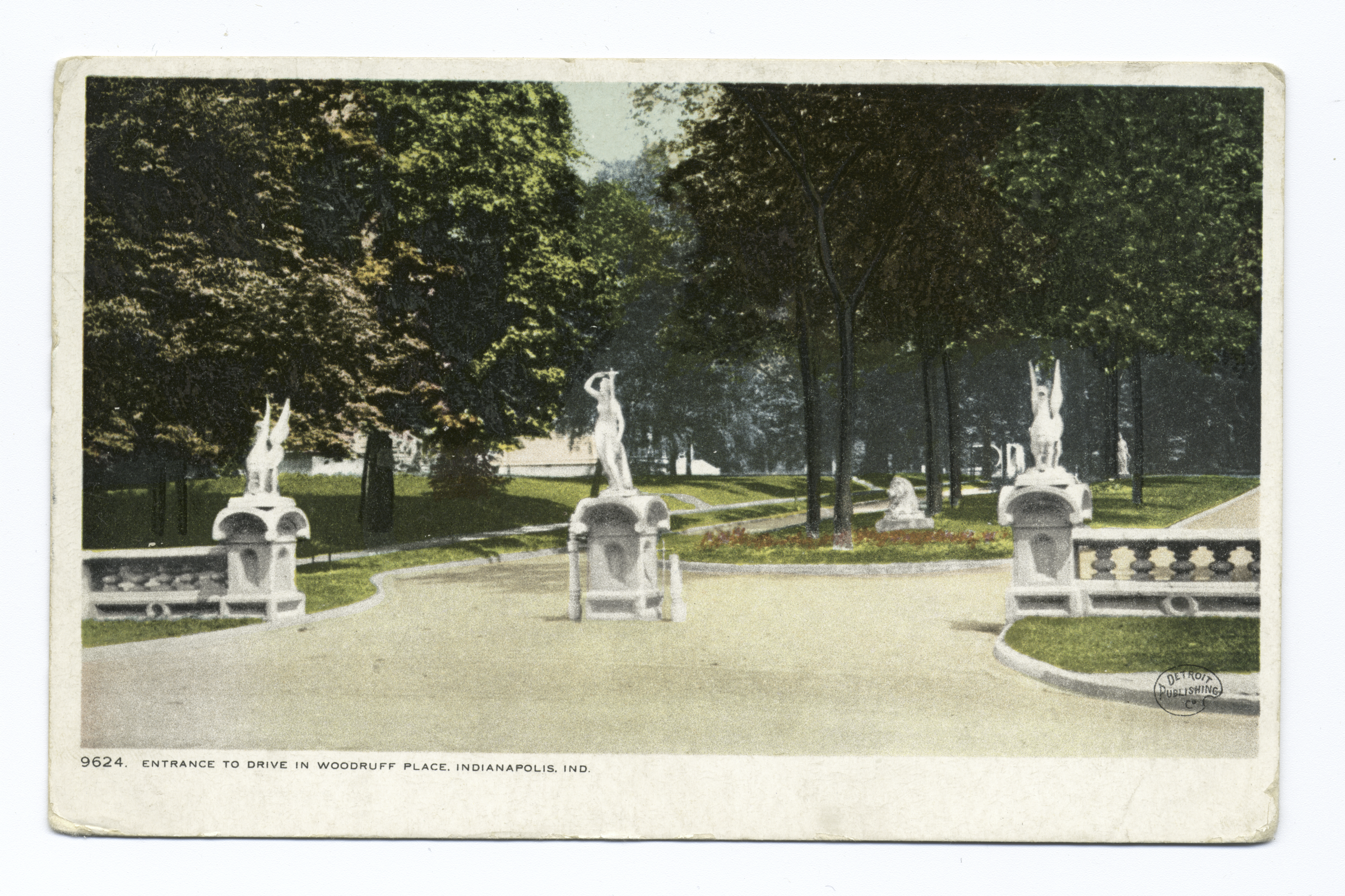
Postcard depicting an entrance to Woodruff Place (ca. 1900)

Woodruff Place was once considered to be one of Indianapolis's more affluent neighborhoods before beginning a gradual decline as the automobile led to the development of newer upscale subdivisions starting in the late 1910s. By the 1950s, many of the grand homes had been subdivided into apartments. Previously, the neighborhood had only a modest collection of duplexes and smaller apartment buildings that had been added beginning in the early 1910s. The neighborhood reached its lowest point in the 1960s, prompting community organizing in the early 1970s to encourage neighborhood revitalization. The 1980s and 1990s saw extensive neighborhood rehabilitation, and Woodruff Place is now considered a highly desirable historic inner-city address.

Its design reflects the developer's plan to build a prestigious enclave. Most of the homes in Woodruff Place are expansive, Victorian style homes from the late 19th century. The layout of the neighborhood is simple; three drives that run north–south (appropriately named East, West, and Middle) and a cross drive (not surprisingly, named Cross Drive). The streets are lined with magnolia and oak trees and, except for Cross Drive, have central medians. A fountain sits at each one of the intersections. Smaller fountains line the medians.

Woodruff Place was the inspiration behind Indianapolis native Booth Tarkington's successful novel The Magnificent Ambersons. Artist T. C. Steele's son Brandt, a noted designer and architect in his own right, and his family were also Woodruff Place residents, living in a home designed by Brandt Steele.

James O. Woodruff also created "Hendricks Place". In the spring of 1872, Thomas A. Hendricks was elected governor of Indiana. He sold his property, the Bates-Hendricks House, to Woodruff, who then created his first Victorian neighborhood, Hendricks Place, surrounding the house. In the fall of that year, Woodruff created Woodruff Place, but few homes were built because a depression in 1873 stopped construction in both neighborhoods for almost twenty years.

In 1972, Woodruff Place was added to the National Register of Historic Places. In 2001, the neighborhood was officially designated a local historic preservation district by the city of Indianapolis.

== See also ==
- List of Indianapolis neighborhoods
- National Register of Historic Places listings in Center Township, Marion County, Indiana
