= Robert Townsend (captain) =

United States Navy Captain (1819–1866)

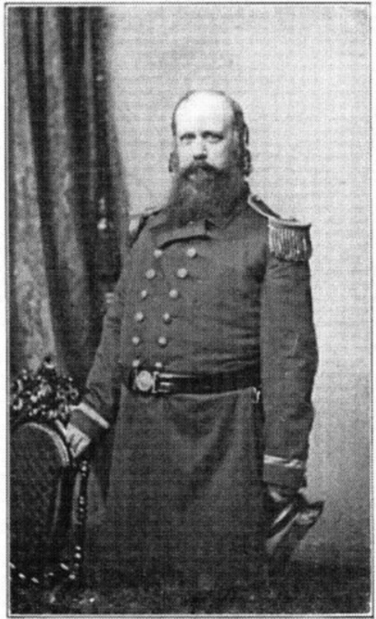
- Captain Robert Townsend circa 1865
- Born: October 21, 1819; Albany, New York
- Died: August 15, 1866 (aged 46); Yangtze River, China
- Burial place: Albany Rural Cemetery
- Military career
- Allegiance: United States; Union
- Branch: United States Navy
- Service years: 1837–1851; 1861–1866
- Rank: Captain
- Commands: USS Miami; USS Essex; USS Wachusett
- Conflicts: Mexican–American War: Siege of Veracruz; American Civil War: Siege of Port Hudson; Battle of Fort DeRussy

Captain Robert Townsend (October 21, 1819 – August 15, 1866) was a Civil War-era ship captain in the United States Navy. He served twice, once before the war then again during the war. He saw active combat while serving aboard three ships, most notably as commander of the USS Essex from 1863 to 1864, an ironclad gunship on the Mississippi River. Captain Townsend died of heatstroke while commanding the USS Wachusett in China in 1866, and is buried in Albany, New York.

== Ancestry ==
Robert Townsend was born on October 21, 1819, in Albany, New York, to Isaiah and Hannah Townsend. His father was an executive of the Stirling Iron Works, which under his great-grandfather Peter Townsend forged The Great Chain which was strung across the Hudson River at West Point and prevented the British Royal Navy from threatening that important American base and potentially controlling the river. His grandfather was Captain Solomon Townsend, who was a merchant ship captain before the American Revolution. Robert Townsend was descended from John and Henry Townsend, New York, among the first settlers of that area in the early 17th century.

== Early life and pre-Civil War career ==
Townsend received his primary education at The Albany Academy, and his secondary education at the Rev. Dr. Dewey's Boarding School in Pittsfield, Massachusetts. After graduating he attended Union College in Schenectady, New York, but left college before graduating in order to join the board of survey of the Utica and Schenectady Railroad Company.

Townsend entered the United States Navy on August 4, 1837, serving first as a midshipman on the ship John Adams. In 1838 he was ordered to the battleship Ohio, then in each subsequent year to the sloop Falmouth, the steamship Missouri. In 1843 he was promoted to passed midshipman and served on the frigate Raritan, then a year later on the brig Porpoise.

He served in the Mexican–American War from 1846 to 1847, where he was engaged in the capture of Vera Cruz. He was promoted to first lieutenant in 1850, and resigned from the navy on April 7, 1851.

On June 19, 1850, Townsend married Harriet Munro, the daughter of Nathan Munro and Cynthia Champlin, of Elbridge, New York. The couple had three children; a son, Robert Townsend, Jr., born October 4, 1854, and daughters Mary Walker Townsend, born December 23, 1858, and Elizabeth Munroe Townsend, born July 19, 1860.

== Civil War service ==
At the beginning of the civil war Townsend re-entered the service on 17 September 1861 as acting-lieutenant, receiving a promotion to commander a few months later, and served on a number of fighting ships.

=== USS Miami ===
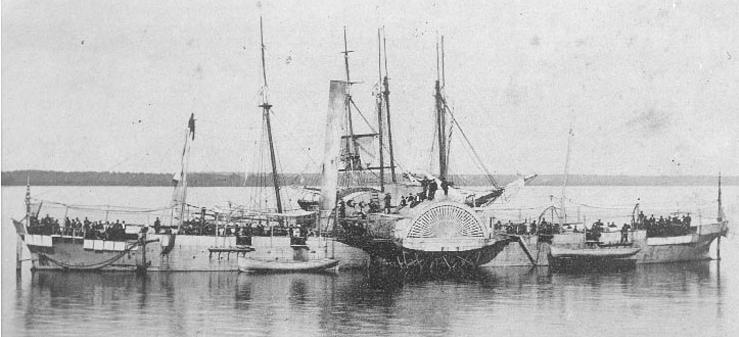
USS Miami

In 1862 Townsend was acting-lieutenant of the Miami under the command of Abram Davis Harrell. The Miami was a side-wheel, double-ender gunboat with a crew of 134 and armament of one 80-pounder Parrott rifle, one 9 inch smoothbore, and four 24-pounder cannon. The ship participated under Admiral David Farragut as part of the Mortar Flotilla in neutralizing Confederate forts below New Orleans. Eliminating the forts permitted the Union ships to move upriver and eventually take New Orleans. Townsend became Commander of the Miami by October of that year.

=== USS Essex ===
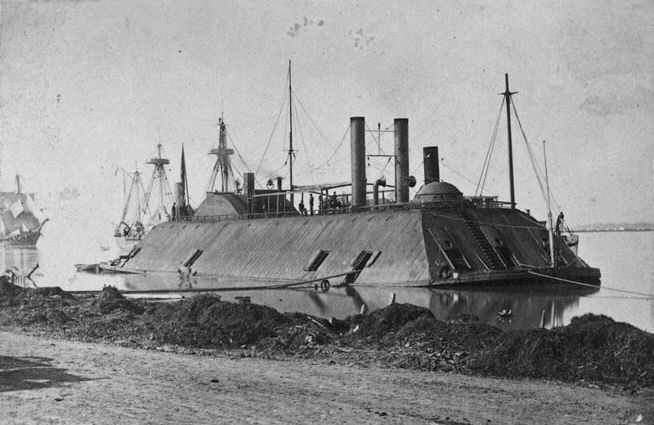
USS Essex

In 1863, he was promoted to commander and given command of the Essex under Admiral David Dixon Porter's Mississippi Squadron. The Essex was a 1,000 ton ironclad river gunboat of the United States Army and later United States Navy during the American Civil War. It was named for Essex County, Massachusetts. Essex was originally constructed in 1856 at New Albany, Indiana, as a steam-powered ferry named New Era. She had a crew of 134, armament consisting of one 32-pounder, three 11-inch Dahlgren smooth bores, one 10-inch Dahlgren smoothbore and one 12-pounder howitzer, with armor consisting of 1¾ inch forward casemate, ¾-inch sides.

Under Townsend's command the Essex participated in the Siege of Port Hudson which occurred from May 21 to July 9, 1863, when Union Army troops assaulted and then captured the Mississippi River town of Port Hudson, Louisiana. Along with the Mortar Flotilla, the Essex bombarded the area daily and helped bring about the surrender of the city. The Union's success in this battle gave Northern forces effective control of the Mississippi River and effectively cut the states of Arkansas and Texas off from the rest of the confederacy.

On July 9, she engaged the enemy at Donaldsonville, Louisiana, and although damaged in the battle, carried out her patrol duty at this point through March 6, 1864 when she sailed with the fleet into the mouth of the Red River and assisted in the capture of Fort DeRussy on March 15 and 16.

Townsend relinquished command of the Essex on November 3, 1864, to Commander Bryson.

=== USS Wachusett ===
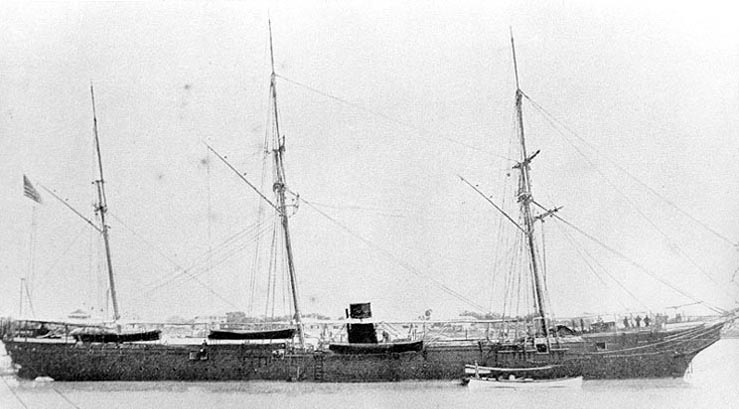
USS Wachusett

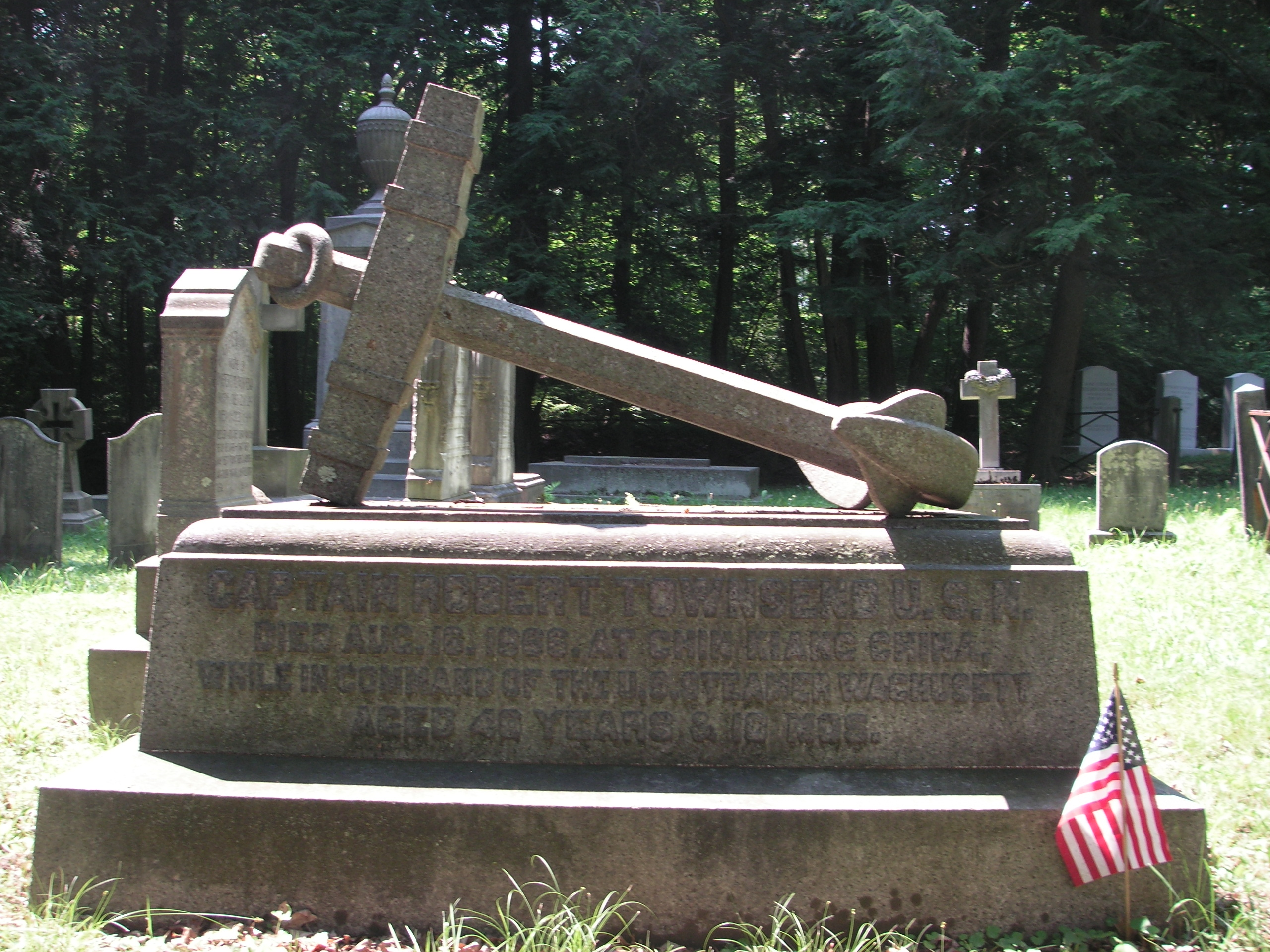
Robert Townsend's grave at the Albany Rural Cemetery.

After relinquishing command of the Essex, Townsend was given command of the Wachusett. The Wachusett was a wooden steam frigate with a detachable propeller, carrying nine guns and a complement of 170 men. She was a large (1,032-ton) steam sloop-of-war that served the United States Navy in the American Civil War. She was outfitted as a gunboat and used by the Navy as part of the Union blockade of the Confederate States of America. On February 17, 1865, the ship was given orders to proceed to the East India Station by way of the Cape of Good Hope. There, she joined Wyoming and Iroquois in an effort to track down the Confederate commerce raider CSS Shenandoah.

While in China the ship was engaged in efforts to track down outlaws and pirates who were harming American interests. In mid-August the ship sailed up the Yangtze River in this mission. The heat was reportedly 107 degrees Fahrenheit (42 °C) in the shade and the ship made difficult passage up the river. A number of cases of heat stroke, some of them fatal occurred. At 1:45 am on August 15, 1866, Robert Townsend died of heat stroke. The executive officer John Woodward (Jack) Philip, (later Admiral), assumed command of the Wachusett and sailed it downriver with the goal of making it to Japan for the health of the crew. That evening the ship anchored by the consulate in Shanghai and held a funeral for their commander.

== Burial ==
Robert Townsend's body was returned to America and is interred at the Albany Rural Cemetery in New York.
