= Thomas Holdup Stevens =

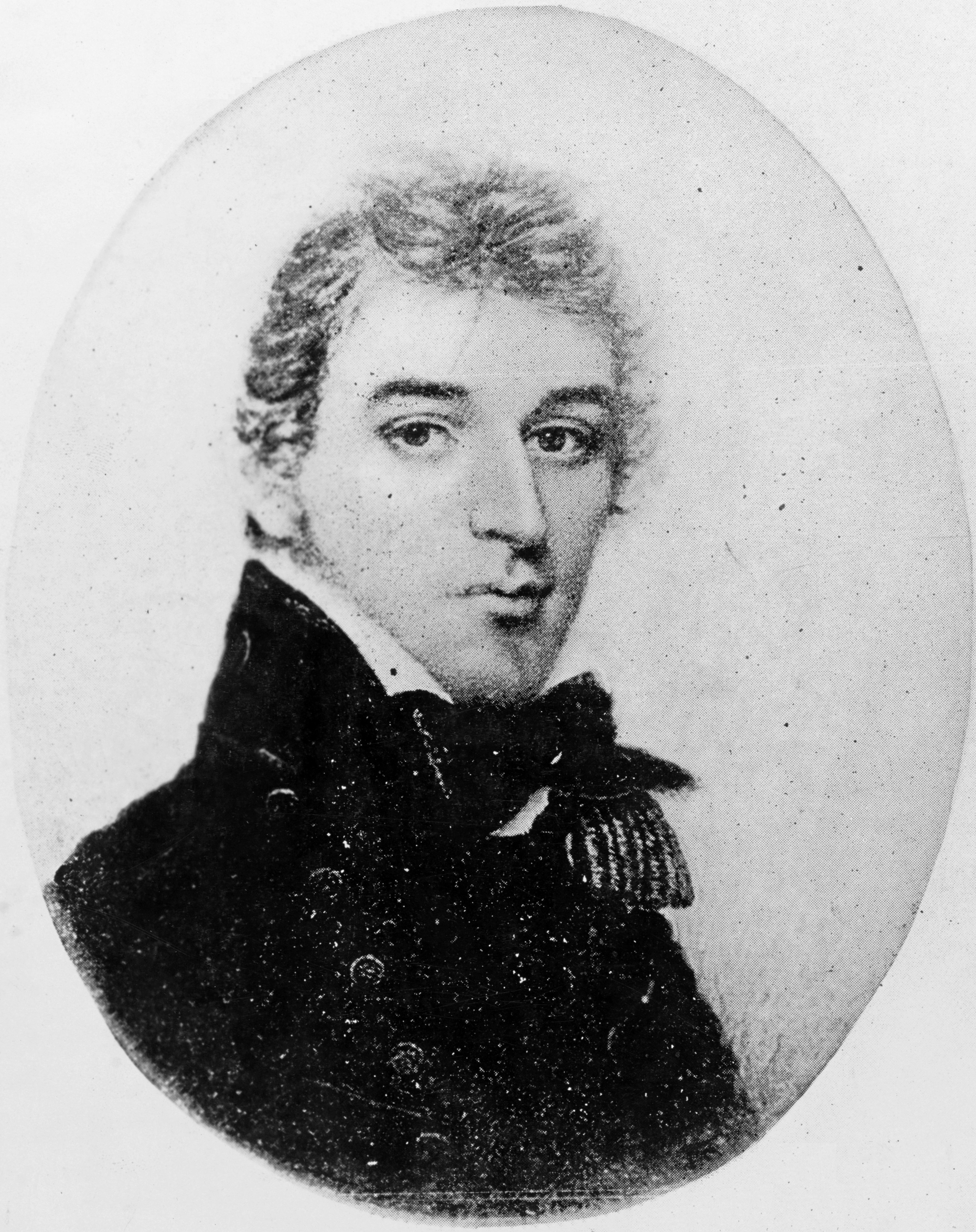
Portrait of Thomas Holdup Stevens in the 1810s

Captain Thomas Holdup Stevens, USN (February 22, 1795 – January 21, 1841) was an American naval commander in the War of 1812.

Born in Charleston, South Carolina, Thomas Holdup was orphaned at an early age and was adopted by General Daniel Stevens. On February 8, 1809, he was appointed midshipman on board Hornet. From then until 1812, he served successively in Constitution, President, and John Adams. Late in 1812, he was assigned to duty with Commodore Isaac Chauncey and distinguished himself in the attack on Black Rock on November 28. Commodore Chauncey appointed him acting lieutenant in January 1813 and his permanent commission in that rank, to date from July 24, was confirmed by the Senate on August 3.

On September 10, he again distinguished himself as captain of the sloop, Trippe, during the Battle of Lake Erie. In 1815, an Act of the Legislature of South Carolina enabled him to add General Stevens' surname to his own. Following the War of 1812, Stevens held many posts, both ashore and afloat, including tours of duty at the Norfolk Naval Shipyard and the Washington Navy Yard. He was promoted to Master Commandant on March 3, 1825 and, in 1829, he embarked on a two-year tour as commanding officer of Ontario, serving in the Mediterranean Sea. In 1832, he was assigned to the Navy Yard at Pensacola and in 1836 he was appointed captain, to date from January 27, 1836. After waiting two years for orders, he was appointed to command of the Washington Navy Yard on February 29, 1840. He served in that capacity until his death there early on the morning of January 21, 1841.

The first Stevens (Destroyer No. 86) was named for the first Thomas Holdup Stevens and the second Stevens (DD-479) honored both him and his son, Rear Admiral Thomas Holdup Stevens, Jr.

Originally buried at the Congressional Cemetery in Washington, his remains were moved to Arlington National Cemetery in June 1905 to rest beside those of his son.
