= USS Stevens (DD-86) =

Wickes-class destroyer

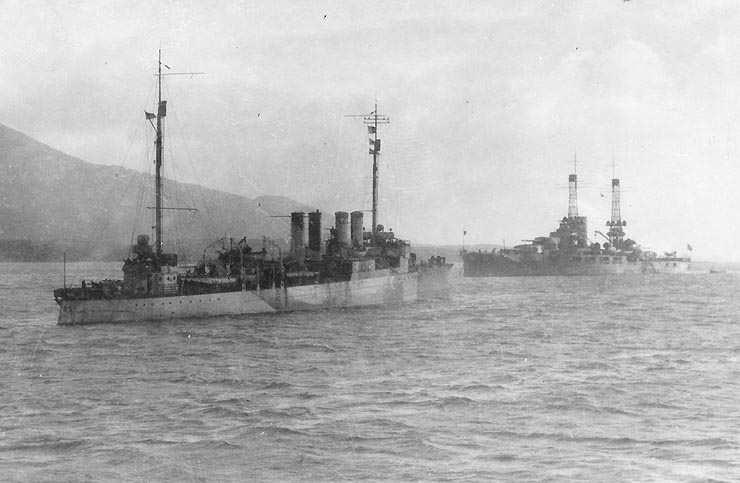
- USS Stevens at Berehaven, Ireland. USS Oklahoma is in the right background.

History

United States
- Name: Stevens
- Namesake: Thomas Holdup Stevens
- Builder: Fore River Shipyard, Quincy, Massachusetts
- Laid down: 20 September 1917
- Launched: 13 January 1918
- Commissioned: 24 May 1918
- Decommissioned: 19 June 1922
- Stricken: 7 January 1936
- Fate: Sold for scrap, 8 September 1936

General characteristics
- Class & type: Wickes-class destroyer
- Displacement: 1,284 tons
- Length: 314 ft 4 1/2 in (95.8 m)
- Beam: 30 ft 11 1/4 in (9.4 m)
- Draft: 9 ft 2 in (2.8 m)
- Speed: 35 knots (65 km/h)
- Complement: 122 officers and enlisted
- Armament: 4 × 4 in (102 mm)/50 guns; 2 × 3 in (76 mm)/23 guns; 12 × 21 in (533 mm) torpedo tubes

USS Stevens (DD–86) was a Wickes-class destroyer in the United States Navy during World War I. She was the first ship named for Thomas Holdup Stevens.

She was laid down at Quincy, Massachusetts, on 20 September 1917 by the Fore River Shipbuilding Corporation. The ship was launched on 13 January 1918, sponsored by Miss Marie Christie Stevens. The destroyer was commissioned at Boston on 24 May 1918.

== Service history ==
Stevens departed Boston on 3 June, and arrived in New York two days later. On 15 June, she sailed for Europe in the screen of a convoy and reached Brest, France, on 27 June. The following day, she headed for Queenstown in Ireland, arriving there on 6 July. Assigned to the United States Naval Forces, Europe, Stevens operated out of that port and protected convoys on the Queenstown-Liverpool circuit until mid-December. She put to sea on 16 December and, after stops at the Azores and Bermuda, entered Boston on 3 January 1919.

Upon her return to the United States, the destroyer was assigned to Destroyer Division 7, Squadron 3, Atlantic Fleet. In the spring of 1919, she cruised to Key West, Florida, and visited New York, before getting underway from Boston on 3 May to participate in the support operations for the first successful transatlantic flight. She put into Halifax, Nova Scotia, on 4 May and stood out again five days later to guard for the Navy seaplanes' flight to Newfoundland. After returning to Halifax on 11 May, she put to sea and, by 19 May, reached Ponta Delgada, in the Azores. Along the way, she assisted in the search for one of the two downed planes, NC-3.

She completed her mission at Boston on 8 June, and a month later, shifted to Newport, Rhode Island, for normal operations. She visited the southeastern coast of the United States during the fall and early winter of 1919 and was at Philadelphia from 17 December 1919 to 1 June 1920. Stevens operated off the New England coast until 3 November 1921, when she set course for Charleston, South Carolina. The destroyer returned to Philadelphia on 8 April 1922 for inactivation. She decommissioned there on 19 June and remained inactive until 7 January 1936 when her name was struck from the Navy list. On 8 September 1936, her hulk was sold to the Boston Iron and Metal Company, Incorporated, of Baltimore, Maryland, for scrapping.
