= Thomas H. Stevens Jr. =

Thomas Holdup Stevens Jr.
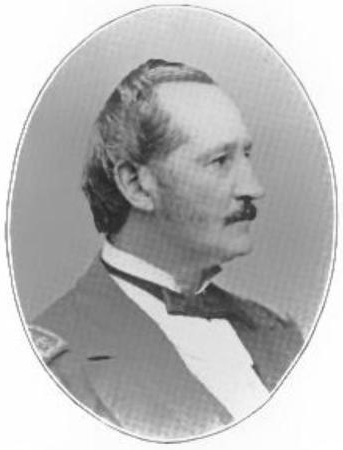
- Born: 27 May 1819; Middletown, Connecticut
- Died: 15 May 1896 (aged 76); Rockville, Maryland
- Burial place: Arlington National Cemetery
- Relatives: Thomas Holdup Stevens (father)
- Military career
- Allegiance: United States of America
- Branch: United States Navy
- Service years: 1836–1855, 1858–1881
- Rank: Rear Admiral
- Commands: Ottawa; Maratanza; Monitor; Sonoma; Patapsco; Oneida; Winnebago; Guerriere; Pacific Squadron
- Conflicts: American Civil War

Thomas Holdup Stevens Jr. (27 May 1819 – 15 May 1896) was an admiral of the United States Navy who fought in the American Civil War.

== Early life and commission ==
Stevens, the son of Captain Thomas Holdup Stevens (1795–1841) was born in Middletown, Connecticut, on 27 May 1819. He was appointed acting midshipman on 14 December 1836 and, after two years at sea in Independence, was warranted midshipman. After three months leave, from April to June 1840, he served at the Depot of Charts and Instruments. Following a tour at the Washington Navy Yard and coast survey duty at New York, he attended the Naval School at Philadelphia, stood his examination on 2 June 1842, and was warranted a passed midshipman on 2 July. Between 1842 and 1855, Stevens served at various posts ashore, among which were two tours on coast survey duty, one tour as acting master of Michigan during her construction and 30 months as storekeeper in Honolulu, Hawaii. In September 1855, Lt. Stevens was dropped from the Navy under an Act of 28 February 1855.

== American Civil War ==
On 29 January 1858, he was recommissioned a lieutenant. From then until the outbreak of the Civil War, Stevens served with the Home Squadron, principally in Roanoke, Colorado, and Michigan. On 4 September 1861, he assumed command of Ottawa. In November, he fought at Port Royal, South Carolina and helped capture Forts Beauregard and Walker. Between New Year's Day and 4 March 1862, he blockaded the coast of Florida and helped to capture Fort Clinch, and the towns of Fernandina and St. Mary's. He also commanded the first expedition up the St. Johns River in March and April.

Late in April, he transferred to the North Atlantic Blockading Squadron, and to the command of Maratanza. He commanded her in operations supporting General George McClellan's advance during the Peninsula Campaign in May 1862. On 15 July, he was promoted to commander and, from 9 May to 6 September, commanded Monitor. He was ordered to the command of Sonoma on 12 September and led her on to capture five Confederate ships and, in a 34-hour chase, privateer Florida.

On 18 June 1863, Commander Stevens was detached from Sonoma at New York and, on 3 August, he was directed to report to the South Atlantic Blockading Squadron. Rear Admiral John A. Dahlgren, the squadron commander, placed Stevens in command of the ironclad Patapsco and, between 21 August and 4 November, he led attacks on the defenses of Charleston harbor. By 1 July 1864, Comdr. Stevens commanded Oneida, operating with the West Gulf Blockading Squadron. There, he took part in operations before Mobile, until 3 August. Admiral David Farragut then ordered him to command the double-turreted monitor Winnebago which he led in attacks on Fort Powell and in the Battle of Mobile Bay on the 5th. He resumed command of Oneida on 18 August and retained it through the end of the war and until August 1865.

== Flag officer ==
In 1866, Comdr. Stevens was appointed lighthouse inspector for the 11th Treasury District. During that assignment, he was promoted to captain. He was detached from duty as lighthouse inspector on 14 September and, on 26 July 1870, was ordered to command Guerriere in the European Squadron. Stevens was promoted to commodore on 19 February 1873, to date from 20 November 1872, and was assigned to the Norfolk Navy Yard—first as commanding officer, then on a special assignment related to Norfolk harbor.

In 1879, he was promoted to rear admiral to date from 19 January 1880, and on 19 August 1880, he was ordered to the command of the Pacific Squadron. He relinquished that command on 16 May 1881, pending his retirement on 27 May.

Stevens was a member of the Military Order of the Loyal Legion of the United States as well as an honorary companion of the Pennsylvania Commandery of the Military Order of Foreign Wars.

Rear Admiral Stevens died at Rockville, Maryland, on 15 May 1896 and was buried at Arlington National Cemetery.

== Family ==
His son Thomas Holdup Stevens III (12 July 1848 – 3 October 1914) was an 1868 United States Naval Academy graduate who retired from the Navy as a rear admiral in February 1905. Born in Honolulu while his father was naval storekeeper there, Stevens III commanded the naval battalion and national guard troops at the August 1898 ceremonies in which the Republic of Hawaii became a territory of the United States. He married Cara de la Montagnie Hall, the eldest daughter of former New York City mayor A. Oakey Hall, on 23 April 1903.

== Legacy ==
In 1942, the destroyer USS Stevens (DD-479) was named in honor of both R.Adm. Stevens and his father, Capt. Thomas H. Stevens.
