= USS Stevens (DD-479) =

Fletcher-class destroyer

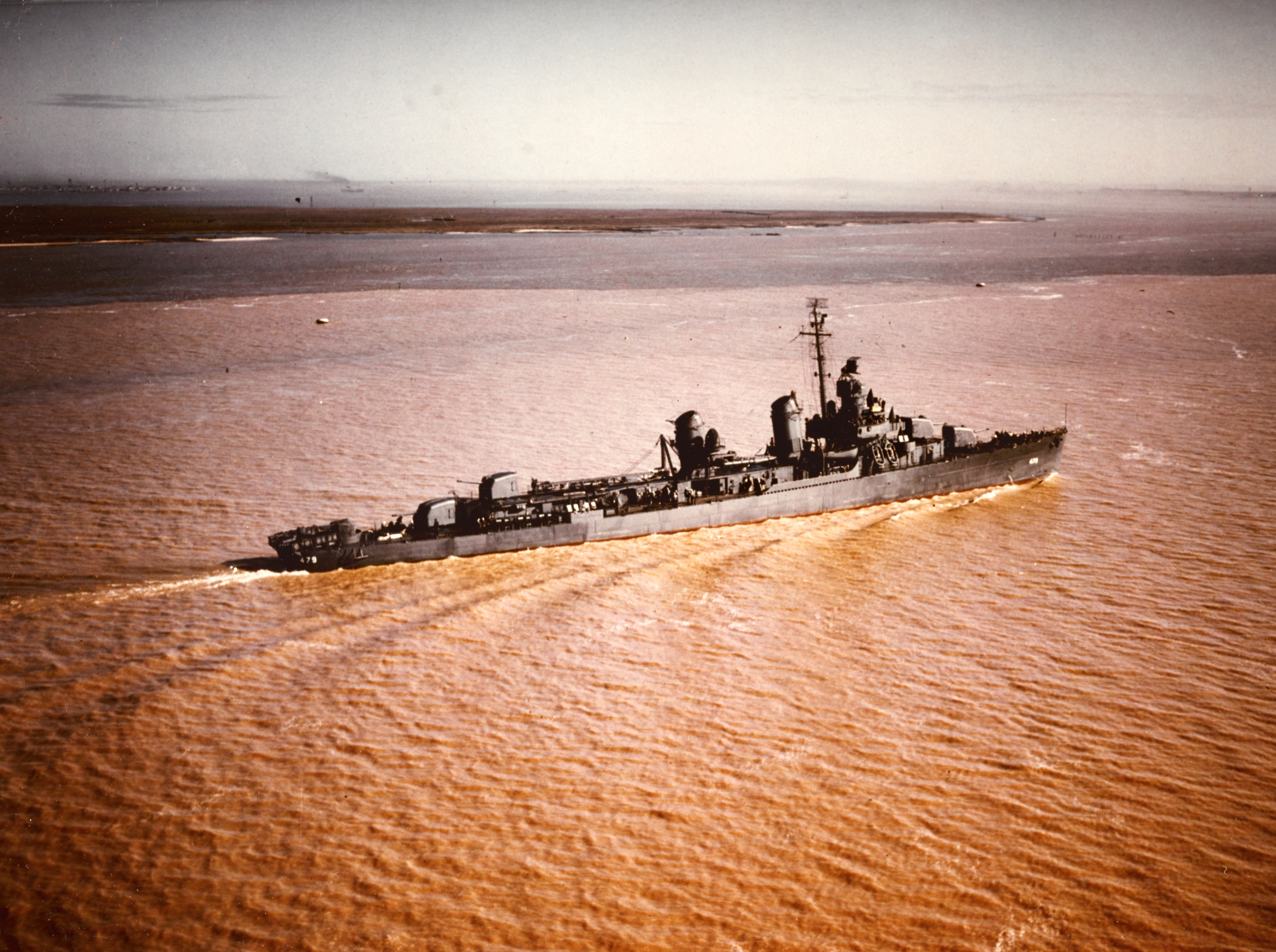
- USS Stevens (March 1943)

History

United States
- Namesake: Thomas Holdup Stevens and Thomas H. Stevens, Jr.
- Builder: Charleston Navy Yard
- Laid down: 30 December 1941
- Launched: 24 June 1942
- Commissioned: 1 February 1943
- Decommissioned: 2 July 1946
- Stricken: 27 November 1973
- Fate: Sold for scrap, 27 November 1973

General characteristics
- Class & type: Fletcher-class destroyer
- Displacement: 2,050 tons
- Length: 376 ft 6 in (114.7 m)
- Beam: 39 ft 8 in (12.1 m)
- Draft: 17 ft 9 in (5.4 m)
- Propulsion: 60,000 shp (45 MW); 2 propellers
- Speed: 35 knots (65 km/h; 40 mph)
- Range: 6500 nmi. (12,000 km) at 15 kt
- Complement: 336
- Armament: 1942: 4 × 5 in (127 mm)/38 cal. guns (4 × 1); 2 × Bofors 40 mm AA guns (1 × 2); 8 × Oerlikon 20 mm AA guns (8 × 1); 5 × 21 in (533 mm) torpedo tubes (1 × 5); 6 × depth charge projectors; 2 × depth charge tracks; 1944: 5 × 5 in (127 mm)/38 cal. guns (5 × 1); 6 × Bofors 40 mm AA guns (3 × 2); 11 × Oerlikon 20 mm AA guns (11 × 1); 10 × 21 in (533 mm) torpedo tubes (2 × 5); 6 × depth charge projectors; 2 × depth charge tracks
- Aircraft carried: 1, one catapult (removed 1943)

USS Stevens (DD-479) was a Fletcher-class destroyer in service with the United States Navy from 1943 to 1946. She was finally sold for scrap in 1973.

== History ==
USS Stevens (DD-479) was named for both Rear Admiral Thomas H. Stevens, Jr. (1819–1896), and his father, Captain Thomas Holdup Stevens (1795–1841). She was laid down on 30 December 1941 at the Charleston Navy Yard; launched on 24 June 1942, co-sponsored by Mrs. Roland Curtin and Mrs. Frederick Stevens Hicks; and commissioned on 1 February 1943 at the Charleston Navy Yard.

=== 1943 ===
Stevens was one of the three Fletcher-class destroyers to be completed with a catapult for a float plane, the others being Pringle (DD-477) and Halford (DD-480). The catapult and an aircraft crane were located just aft of the number 2 smokestack, in place of the aft torpedo tube mount, 5 inch mount number 3, and the 2nd deck of the after deck house which normally carried a twin 40 mm anti-aircraft gun on most ships of the class. (The twin 40 mm mount was moved to the fantail, just forward of the depth charge racks, where most ships of the class carried 20 mm mounts.) It was intended that the float plane be used for scouting for the destroyer flotilla which the ship was attached to. It would be launched by the catapult, land on the water next to the ship, and be recovered by the aircraft crane. It turned out to be not operationally suitable for the intended purpose, and the 3 ships were ultimately converted to the standard Fletcher-class configuration.

Stevens completed shakedown in the Atlantic during the spring of 1943, then escorted coastal convoys before heading for the Panama Canal in July. On 26 July she transited the canal, and moored at Balboa the following day. She departed on 28 July, headed west to Hawaii, and entered Pearl Harbor on 9 August. By that time, American industrial prowess was beginning to produce and put into action the powerful naval force which, within two years, brought the Japanese Empire to its knees. Stevens, one of a new class of fast, well-armed destroyers, joined three new Essex-class aircraft carriers and the fast battleships Alabama (BB-60) and South Dakota (BB-57) in augmenting the U.S. Pacific Fleet. In late August, she accompanied the Task Force 15 (TF 15) carriers to warm-up raids on the Gilbert Islands. Their planes hit Marcus Island on the 31st and Tarawa on 18 September, but Stevens parted company with them and steamed for the West Coast before their 5 and 6 October raids on Wake Island. By the time of her departure from the west coast on the 6th, the assaults on Makin and on Tarawa had been made, and the atolls were all but secure.

=== 1944: Central and South Pacific ===
Though she had missed out on the first hop of the leapfrog across the Central Pacific, Stevens rejoined the 5th Fleet in time to be part of the second jump. Attached to Task Group 52.8 (TG 52.8), the fire support group, the destroyer participated in Operation Flintlock, the Kwajalein phase of the conquest of the Marshall Islands, in late January and early February 1944. She bombarded the islands before the landings and afterward delivered support gunfire to the Marines until it was no longer necessary.

However, Stevens' tour of duty with the 5th Fleet in the Central Pacific soon ended, for she cleared Kwajalein on 4 February 1944 for the South Pacific area. She stopped at Funafuti, in the Ellice Islands, from 8 to 13 February; then joined Lang (DD-399), Hogan (DD-178), Hamilton (DD-141), and Stansbury (DD-180) to screen Transport Divisions 24 and 26. The convoy divided on the 15th, and the Guadalcanal detachment, consisting of Stevens and Lang screening DuPage (APA-41), Aquarius (AKA-16), and Almaack (AK-27), arrived off Koli Point three days later. On 19 February, Stevens departed Guadalcanal to accompany Almaack to New Caledonia. They reached Nouméa on 22 February. After four days at the French port, the destroyer got underway in company with SS Japara back to the Solomons. On 4 March, she screened the merchantman into Tulagi harbor; fueled at nearby Port Purvis on Florida Island; then took station ahead of SS Mormacwren for a voyage to Efate. The Stevens put into Havannah Harbor on 5 March after parting company with the merchantman, which continued on independently to Auckland, New Zealand.

Following 10 days in the Efate area, the Stevens sortied with Task Force 37 to bombard the Kavieng area of northwestern New Ireland. Until mid-March, an assault upon this area had been assumed to be necessary to complete the circle around the huge Japanese base at Rabaul on New Britain Island and to provide a base for operations north to the Philippines. However, the decision to occupy part of the Admiralty Islands obviated Kavieng as a base; and the planners felt that the air campaign against Rabaul was proceeding so well that it was neutralizing that large Japanese base without the occupation of Kavieng. Consequently, the naval bombardment, during which the Stevens concentrated on the islands of Nusa and Nusalik, was the only phase of the operation carried out, but it was nevertheless highly effective. Samuel Eliot Morison quotes Japanese sources which attest to the "demoralizing" effect of the bombardments, in which Stevens, two escort carriers, and 14 other destroyers joined the battleships New Mexico (BB-40), Mississippi (BB-41), Tennessee (BB-43), and Idaho (BB-42).

The Stevens returned to Efate on 25 March 1944, and she remained there almost two weeks. On 5 April, she got underway with Destroyer Squadron 25 (DesRon 25) to steam up the eastern coast of New Guinea. After stopovers at Milne Bay and Cape Sudest, the destroyers rendezvoused with TG 77.4 off Cape Cretin on 19 April and steamed on to the Hollandia, New Guinea, invasion area. TG 77.4, the second echelon of the Hollandia invasion force, divided on [22 April, and the Stevens screened the western reinforcement group while its troops landed at Tanamerah Bay. She departed from Hollandia on 30 April 1944 and retraced her steps down the east coast of New Guinea, then she headed east to the Solomon Islands, entering Purvis Bay on 10 May.

For almost a month, she remained in the Solomons, escorting convoys, conducting combat training, and resting and resupplying in port. Then, on 4 June 1944, she steamed on a course for the Marshall Islands, reaching Kwajalein on the 8th, patrolling there until the 12th, and then steaming for Eniwetok. She entered that lagoon on 28 June, and stayed there until 17 July, when she departed in the screen of TG 53.3, transporting troops to the Guam assault. The task group arrived off Guam early on the morning of the day of the landings, 21 July 1944; and the Stevens fired on enemy positions as the troops disembarked from the transports and landed on the island. The destroyer continued her fire support role of delivering harassing, interdiction, and call fire in support of the American troops and Marines ashore until her departure on 26 July 1944.

The Stevens returned to Eniwetok on 30 July, and then she steamed for Guadalcanal the following day. Stevens reached Guadalcanal on 5 August, but continued on to Espiritu Santo, which she reached the next day. She departed Espiritu Santo on 14 August and moored in Purvis Bay two days later. On 17 July the Stevens headed for New Guinea. The Stevens arrived at Humboldt Bay on 21 July, and then made a trip to Maffin Bay and back; then, on 7 September, she stood out of Humboldt Bay for Aitape. She joined Task Force 77 at Aitape and, on 10 September, sortied with that task force for Morotai in the East Indies. Five days later, the assault troops stormed ashore on Morotai, to little opposition. The Stevens patrolled while the transports unloaded men and equipment. Late that afternoon, she steamed back towards Humboldt Bay, escorting HMAS Manoora and HMAS Kanimbla. This small convoy reached its destination on 18 September; and the following day, Stevens joined McKee (DD-575) in the screen of another echelon bound for Morotai. Upon her arrival back at Morotai, the Stevens began patrolling as a radar and anti-submarine picket off Kaoe Bay, and serving on night's patrol south of Morotai.

The Stevens remained in the vicinity of Morotai from 23 September until 3 October. During that time, she continued her various patrols; fought off air attacks; and, after 25 September, served as headquarters for the landing craft control officer. On 3 October, she cleared Morotai in company with the Lang (DD-399). The two destroyers put into Humboldt Bay two days later. On 16 October the Stevens got underway in the screen of TG 78.6, Leyte Reinforcement Group One. After a six-day voyage, the convoy arrived in Leyte Gulf, and the Stevens refueled before escorting TG 78.10 back to New Guinea. Between 28 October and 9 December 1944, the Stevens accompanied three more convoys from the New Guinea area to Leyte Gulf.

=== 1945: Philippines and Borneo ===
From 9 December 1944, until 7 June 1945, Stevens operated primarily in the Philippines; her only break being a voyage from Lingayen Gulf to Manus; she then proceeded back via Hollandia to Leyte, where she remained from 13 February to 4 March. From 20 to 23 December 1944, she escorted Ruticulus to Guiuan on Samar and back to Leyte. Between 27 December 1944 and 1 January 1945, while screening a resupply echelon (TU 78.3.15) to Mindoro and back, the Stevens shot down three enemy planes during frequent air attacks that occurred in the area. On 9 January 1945, she got underway to escort a supply echelon to Lingayen Gulf. On the day before the convoy's arrival, it was attacked by six Japanese planes; four were downed by the screen's anti-aircraft fire, and the other two departed.

The Stevens' convoy reached Lingayen Gulf on 13 January, and she patrolled on a radar picket station until 18 January, and also stood by to deliver fire support if necessary. On 23 January she returned to Leyte Island. On 2 February she rendezvoused with Task Unit 78.12.9 (TU 78.12.9), and then escorted it into San Pedro Bay on 5 February; then she departed again to rendezvous with TU 78.7.2 off Dulag, Philippines. Stevens guarded that convoy to Lingayen Gulf, arriving on 9 February and remaining there until 13 February 1945.

After returning from a voyage to Manus and Hollandia, back to the Philippines, she put into Manila Bay, Luzon, on 6 March, and on the 9th, she headed for Lingayen Gulf. En route, she stopped over at Mindoro on the night of 10/11 March; then she arrived at Lingayen on 12 March. From 13 to 15 March, she joined Frazier in a search for downed American flyers. The Frazier picked up six men of a B-24 crew, and the Stevens was released to overtake and join TG 72.4 on 16 March. She refueled at Mangarin Bay, Mindoro, that day, and then got underway with the cruiser Cleveland, and the destroyers Conway, and Eaton to support the landings at Iloilo on Panay Island from 18 to 20 March. She cleared Panay on the 20th, arrived at Mindoro on 21 March, and then joined the screen of TG 74.2.

For the next month, Stevens operated out of Subic Bay, Luzon. Next, on 14 April, she got underway with TG 74.2 to participate in the landings in the Parang-Malabang-Cotabato area of Mindanao Island. Stevens arrived off Polloc Harbor on 17 April and patrolled the landing area, screening the cruiser Denver and delivering fire support for the troops, until 19 April. She returned to Subic Bay, Luzon, on 21 April, and then remained for a week and a day. On 29 April 1945, Stevens steamed back to Mindanao, and, after a stop at Police Harbor, she reached Davao Gulf, Mindanao on 1 May. On 3 May, she supported the minesweeping units in the Santa Cruz area and again screened the Denver, while the cruiser delivered fire support with her 6-inch (150 mm) guns. Stevens headed back to Subic Bay, Luzon, that same day, and she arrived on 6 May. She spent the following month in the Manila Bay-Subic Bay area, engaged in exercises, upkeep, repairs, and shore leave.

On 7 June Stevens departed the Philippines with TG 74.2 to support the invasion of Borneo in the East Indies. From 9 to 11 June, she patrolled off Brunei Bay, Borneo, in the support force for the attack group. On the 11th, she steamed for Tawi Tawi with most of the task force. After stopping at Tawi Tawi over the night of 12/13 June, she arrived at Balikpapan, Borneo, on 15 June, and supported the Balikpapan invasion until 2 July. From 15 to 17 June, she supported the minesweepers. On the 17th, she bombarded the beaches at Klandasan and also fought off an air attack that evening during night retirement. She conducted another shore bombardment on 19 June, and then engaged shore batteries on 21 and 23 June, silencing two of them on the 23rd. The troops landed on 1 July, and the Stevens helped cover them with counter-battery and harassing fire throughout the day and into the night. The following day, she departed Balikpapan en route to Leyte Gulf, the Philippines.

The Stevens entered San Pedro Bay on 5 July and then remained there for one week. On 12 July, she steamed out of the bay, and then reached Subic Bay three days later. The Stevens conducted tactical and anti-submarine warfare [ASW] exercises in the Manila Bay-Subic Bay area of Luzon for the duration of the War in the Pacific.

On 28 August 1945, almost two weeks after the cessation of hostilities, Stevens departed from Subic Bay with TG 71.1 and headed for the Yellow Sea and western Korea. On 30 August, the Stevens, Bell, and Burns were dispatched to Buckner Bay, Okinawa, where they reported to Carrier Division 5 for duty.

Stevens exited that bay two days later in the screen of the carriers of TF 72 and steamed for Inchon, Korea. On 10 September, she put into Inchon for repairs and, from 19 to 20 September, she screened the cruiser New Orleans to Tsingtao, China. There, she assisted in the internment of Japanese ships until 29 September; then she shifted to Taku Bar where she supported troop landings until 6 October. On 7 October, Stevens arrived at Chefoo Harbor, joined TU 71.1.5, and then steamed for Inchon. Following a five-day stay there, she departed on 13 October with troops, sailors, and Marines, bound for the United States. The Stevens stopped at Guam on 19 October, and after steaming to Hawaii, she spent two days at Pearl Harbor, Oahu. From there, she steamed to the West Coast, reaching San Diego, California, on 7 November 1945.

=== Post-war ===
On 8 November 1945, after discharging her passengers, the Stevens steamed to San Pedro, Los Angeles, and there reported for duty to the 19th (Reserve) Fleet for a deactivation overhaul. She was decommissioned on 2 July 1946, and she remained with the Pacific Reserve Fleet until 1 December 1972 when her name was stricken from the Navy list. On 27 November 1973, her hulk was sold to Zidell Explorations, Inc., of Portland, Oregon, for scrapping.

== Awards ==
The USS Stevens was awarded nine battle stars for her service during World War II.

== Trivia ==
Comic book artist Sam Glanzman served aboard the Stevens from 1941 until 1945, and chronicled his years aboard her in a series of short stories for DC Comics and in a pair of Marvel Comics graphic novels, A Sailor's Story and A Sailor's Story, Book Two: Winds, Dreams, and Dragons.
