= John Woodward Philip =

U.S. Navy officer (1840–1900)

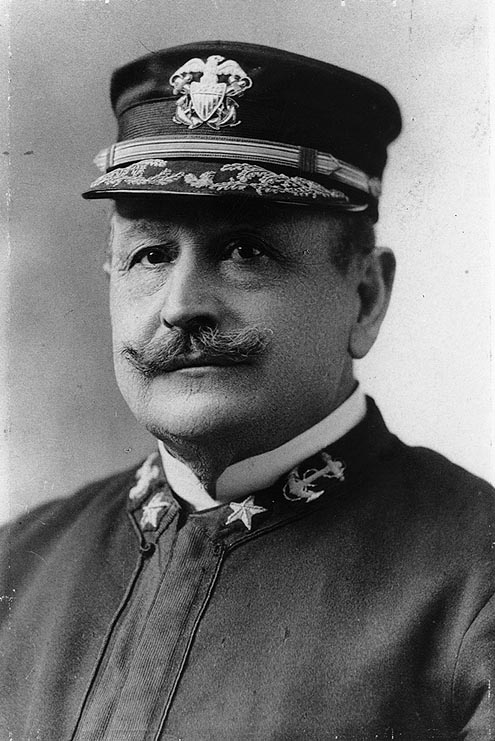
- Philip, c. 1898–1899
- Born: August 26, 1840; Kinderhook, New York
- Died: June 30, 1900 (aged 59); New York City
- Military career
- Allegiance: United States of America
- Branch: United States Navy
- Service years: 1856–1900
- Rank: Rear admiral
- Commands: Wachusett; Tuscarora; Texas; 2nd Squadron, North Atlantic Fleet
- Conflicts: American Civil War; Spanish–American War

John Woodward Philip (August 26, 1840 – June 30, 1900) was an officer in the United States Navy during the Civil War and Spanish–American War.

== Biography ==
Born in Kinderhook, Columbia County, New York, Philip was appointed midshipman on September 20, 1856 and graduated from the Naval Academy on June 1, 1861.

=== Civil War ===
During the Civil War, he served on the Santee, Marion and Sonoma until September 1862 when he was ordered to Chippewa, attached to the South Atlantic Blockading Squadron. While serving in Chippewa, he was wounded during operations against Charleston, South Carolina, in July 1863.

=== Post-Civil War (1865–1898) ===
Philip served as executive officer of the steam sloop Wachusett under Commander Robert Townsend and assumed command upon Townsend's death from heat stroke in China on August 15, 1866.

In 1877 he was named as the commander of the Woodruff Scientific Expedition around the world organised by developer James O. Woodruff. However this expedition did not go ahead due to difficulties obtaining a suitable ship and Philip then took command of the Tuscarora to survey the West coast of Mexico. Later he commanded the battleship Texas from October 18, 1897 to August 29, 1898.

=== Spanish–American War ===
During the Spanish–American War, his ship, with the cruiser Marblehead, led the attack and silenced the fort on Cayo del Toro, Guantanamo Bay, on 15 June 1898. On 3 July 1898, in command of Texas, he participated in the Battle of Santiago de Cuba, in which Pascual Cervera y Topete's Spanish Fleet was destroyed off Santiago de Cuba. During the battle, upon watching the burning of the Vizcaya, he famously told his men "Don't cheer, boys. The poor devils are dying." He was advanced five numbers in grade on August 10, 1898 for eminent and conspicuous service in battle. From September 3 until December 28, 1898, he served as Commander of the 2nd Squadron, North Atlantic Fleet, flying his broad pennant in the armored cruiser New York.

=== Later career and death ===
Commencing January 14, 1899, he was in command of the New York Navy Yard and Naval Station, and was promoted to rear admiral on 3 March 1899. While serving in this duty, Admiral Philip died suddenly on June 30, 1900.

== Namesake ==
Two destroyers have been named USS Philip in his honor.

== See also ==
- American Civil War
- Spanish–American War
