= Alexander Bradley =

- Born: September 19, 1851; Boston, Massachusetts, U.S.
- Died: March 6, 1925 (aged 73); Akron, Ohio, U.S.
- Burial place: Holy Cross Cemetery, Akron, Ohio
- Military career
- Allegiance: United States
- Branch: United States Navy
- Rank: Landsman
- Unit: USS Wachusett
- Awards: Medal of Honor

Alexander Bradley (September 19, 1851 – March 6, 1925), also known as Neil Bonner, was a United States Navy sailor and a recipient of the United States military's highest decoration, the Medal of Honor.

== Biography ==
A native of Boston, Massachusetts, Bradley joined the Navy from that state. By August 7, 1872, he was serving as a landsman on the USS Wachusett. On that day, while Wachusett was off the coast of Cowes, England, he jumped overboard and attempted to save Landsman Philip Cassidy of the USS Wabash from drowning. For this action, he was awarded the Medal of Honor two months later, on October 10.

Bradley's official Medal of Honor citation reads:

On board the U.S.S. Wachusett off Cowes, 7 August 1872. Jumping overboard into a strong tideway, Bradley attempted to save Philip Cassidy, landsman, of the U.S.S. Wabash, from drowning.

Bradley left the Navy while still a landsman. He died at age 73 and was buried at Holy Cross Cemetery in Akron, Ohio.

== See also ==
- List of Medal of Honor recipients in non-combat incidents
