= USS Sonoma (1862) =

Gunboat of the United States Navy

History

United States
- Name: USS Sonoma
- Namesake: Sonoma Creek, in northern California; Sonoma County, California; and Sonoma, California, the latter in turned named for a chief of the Chocuyen people
- Builder: Portsmouth Navy Yard, Kittery, Maine
- Launched: 15 April 1862
- Commissioned: 8 July 1862
- Decommissioned: 13 June 1865
- Fate: Sold 1 October 1867

General characteristics
- Type: Steam gunboat
- Displacement: 955 long tons (970 t)
- Length: 233 ft 9 in (71.25 m)
- Beam: 34 ft 10 in (10.62 m)
- Draft: 12 ft 3 in (3.73 m)
- Propulsion: Steam engine
- Armament: 1 × 100-pounder Parrott rifle; 1 × 11 in (280 mm) Dahlgren smoothbore; 6 × 24-pounder howitzers; 2 × 12-pounder rifles

The first USS Sonoma was a sidewheel gunboat that served in the United States Navy during the American Civil War. She was named for Sonoma Creek in northern California, Sonoma County, California, and the town of Sonoma, California, that in turn were named for one of the chiefs of the Chocuyen Indians of that region.

Sonoma was launched by the Portsmouth Navy Yard at Kittery, Maine, on 15 April 1862; sponsored by Miss Mary N. Bleecker; and commissioned on 8 July 1862, Commander Thomas H. Stevens, Jr. in command.

== Service history ==
=== 1862–1863 ===
On 17 July 1862, the double-ender sailed for the West Indies for operations against Confederate blockade runners and raiders on the high seas. The success of Confederate cruisers, especially Florida and Alabama, in operations against Union shipping prompted the Department of the Navy on 8 September 1862 to put Commodore Charles Wilkes in command of a "flying" West India Squadron created specifically to seek out and destroy the Confederate raiders. Sonoma was assigned to this squadron. While Sonoma never engaged Florida or Alabama, she did operate successfully against blockade runners.

On 5 October 1862, Sonoma chased Harriet Pinckney back into port after she had attempted to slip out of Bermuda reportedly carrying "infernal machines or torpedoes ... for destroying ships in harbor." On 18 January 1863, Sonoma and the sloop-of-war Wachusett seized Virginia off Mugeres Island, Mexico, and sent the steamer to Key West, Florida, for adjudication.

On 3 February 1863, Sonoma captured the British bark Springbok. On 15 February 1863, she took the brig Atlantic bound from Havana, Cuba, for Matamoros, Mexico. Finally, on 14 April 1863, she took the schooner Clyde in the Gulf of Mexico after Clyde had escaped from the Confederacy laden with cotton and rosin.

The wear and tear of hard service at sea was catching up with Sonoma, and she sailed north for repairs. The ship reached New York City on 13 June 1863 and was decommissioned on 20 June 1863.

=== 1863–1865 ===
With repairs completed, Sonoma was recommissioned on 28 September 1863 and assigned to the South Atlantic Blockading Squadron in which she served for the rest of the Civil War. Highlights of this service included her capture on 8 July 1864 of Ida a sidewheel steamer which had slipped out of Sapelp Sound, Georgia, and was bound for the Bahamas laden with cotton. In December 1864, Sonoma was part of a Union naval force that landed Union Army troops and a battalion of United States Marines at Gregorie Point near Yemassee, South Carolina, in an attempt to cut the rail line between Savannah, Georgia, and Charleston, South Carolina; they were defeated by a significantly smaller Confederate force in the Battle of Tulifinny.

Early in 1865, Sonoma participated in operations of the squadron clearing the way for General William Tecumseh Sherman in his march north from Savannah. On 9 February 1865, Sonoma, the sloop-of-war USS Pawnee, and the sidewheel steamer USS Daffodil engaged Confederate batteries at Togodo Creek, near North Edisto, South Carolina. Sonoma was hit twice in the action, but she silenced the Confederate guns. On the same day, Sherman was marching on nearby Orangeburg, South Carolina, which he took on 12 February 1865. Assurance of Union naval control of the waters in its path enabled Sherman's army to travel fast and light and helped to shorten the war.

On 16 and 17 February 1865, Sonoma joined in the naval support of the Union Army's attack on Bull's Bay, South Carolina, a diversionary movement in the major drive on Charleston. A boat party from the ship helped in the fighting ashore.

The tempo of Sonoma's activity eased somewhat as Sherman moved north close to territory whose waters were within the jurisdiction of the North Atlantic Blockading Squadron, but she and her sister ships remained as visible evidence of Union power. After the Confederacy collapsed in April 1865, the ship sailed north and was decommissioned at New York City on 13 June 1865. She was sold there on 1 October 1867.

== See also ==
- Union Navy
