= USS Winnebago (1863) =

Milwaukee-class river monitor

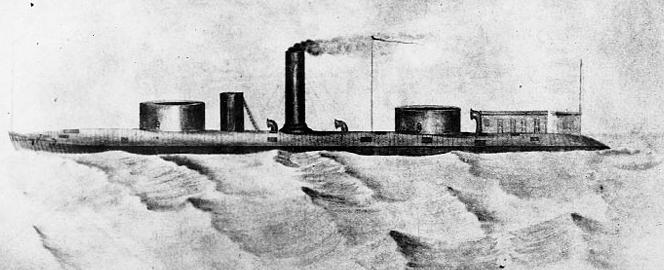
- A contemporary sketch of USS Winnebago

History

United States
- Name: USS Winnebago
- Namesake: Winnebago Indians
- Ordered: 27 May 1862
- Builder: Union Iron Works, Carondelet, St. Louis
- Laid down: 1862
- Launched: 4 July 1863
- Commissioned: 27 April 1864
- Renamed: Tornado, 15 June 1869; Winnebago, 10 August 1869
- Fate: Sold for scrap, 12 September 1874

General characteristics
- Class & type: Milwaukee-class river monitor
- Displacement: 1,300 long tons (1,300 t)
- Tons burthen: 970 bm
- Length: 229 ft (69.8 m)
- Beam: 56 ft (17.1 m)
- Draft: 6 ft (1.8 m)
- Depth of hold: 8 ft 6 in (2.6 m)
- Installed power: 7 × Tubular boilers
- Propulsion: 4 × Shafts; 2 × Non-condensing steam engines
- Speed: 9 knots (17 km/h; 10 mph)
- Complement: 138
- Armament: 2 × twin 11-inch (279 mm) Smoothbore Dahlgren guns
- Armor: Gun turrets: 8 in (203 mm); Side: 3 in (76 mm); Deck: .75–1.5 in (19–38 mm); Conning tower: 3 in (76 mm)

USS Winnebago was a double-turret Milwaukee-class river monitor, named for the Winnebago or Ho-Chunk tribe of Siouan Native Americans, built for the Union Navy during the American Civil War. The ship participated in the Battle of Mobile Bay in 1864, during which she was lightly damaged, and the bombardments of Forts Gaines and Morgan as Union troops besieged the fortifications defending the bay. In early 1865, Winnebago again supported Union forces during the Mobile Campaign as they attacked Confederate fortifications defending the city of Mobile, Alabama. She was placed in reserve after the end of the war and sold in 1874.

== Description ==
Winnebago was 229 feet (69.8 m) long overall and had a beam of 56 feet (17.1 m). The ship had a depth of hold of 8 feet 6 inches (2.6 m) and a draft of 6 feet (1.8 m). She was 970 tons burthen and displaced 1,300 long tons (1,300 t). Her crew numbered 138 officers and enlisted men.

The ship was powered by two 2-cylinder horizontal non-condensing steam engines, each driving two propellers, using steam generated by seven tubular boilers. The engines were designed to reach a top speed of 9 knots (17 km/h; 10 mph). Winnebago carried 156 long tons (159 t) of coal.

The ship's main armament consisted of four smoothbore, muzzle-loading 11-inch Dahlgren guns mounted in two twin-gun turrets. Her forward turret was designed by James Eads and her rear turret by John Ericsson. Each gun weighed approximately 16,000 pounds (7,300 kg) and could fire a 136-pound (61.7 kg) shell up to a range of 3,650 yards (3,340 m) at an elevation of +15°.

The cylindrical turrets were protected by eight layers of wrought iron 1-inch (25 mm) plates. The sides of the hull consisted of three layers of one-inch plates, backed by 15 inches (380 mm) of pine. The deck was heavily cambered to allow headroom for the crew on such a shallow draft and it consisted of iron plates .75 inches (19 mm) thick. The pilothouse, positioned behind and above the fore turret, was protected by 3 inches (76 mm) of armor.

== Construction and service ==
James Eads was awarded the contracts for all four of the Milwaukee-class ships. He laid down Winnebago at his Union Iron Works Carondelet, St. Louis in 1862. The first U.S. Navy ship to be named after the Indian tribe, she was launched on 4 July 1863 and commissioned on 27 April 1864.

Initially assigned to the Mississippi River Squadron, Winnebago operated on the Mississippi River defending Union ships against Confederate raids and ambushes for several months. She was transferred to Rear Admiral David Farragut's West Gulf Blockading Squadron on 9 July, together with her sister Chickasaw. The ship required some time to refit at New Orleans and prepare for the voyage to Mobile across the Gulf of Mexico, so the two sisters did not depart New Orleans until 29 July. On the voyage down the Mississippi to the Pass A Loutre, Chickasaw was forced to anchor overnight because of steering problems and the two ships did not cross the sandbar at the mouth of the pass until the evening of the following day. Once in the Gulf, Winnebago was taken under tow by the sidewheel gunboat Metacomet for the voyage across the Gulf. Farragut inspected the monitor after her arrival and was dismayed to learn that one of her turrets had jammed. He also preferred to have a more experienced officer in command and appointed Commander Thomas H. Stevens, Jr. as her new captain.

Farragut's plan for the battle was relatively simple. The larger, more heavily armed monitors Tecumseh and Manhattan were to keep the ironclad ram CSS Tennessee away from the vulnerable wooden ships while they were passing Fort Morgan and then sink her. Chickasaw and Winnebago were to engage the fort until all of the wooden ships had passed. The four monitors would form the starboard column of ships, closest to Fort Morgan, with Winnebago in the rear, while the wooden ships formed a separate column to port. The eastern side of the channel closest to Fort Morgan was free of obstacles, but "torpedoes", as mines were called at the time, were known to be present west of a prominent black buoy in the channel.

The two Milwaukee-class ships bombarded Fort Morgan for about an hour and a half while the wooden ships passed through the mouth of Mobile Bay; Winnebago beginning at 07:15 even though her forward turret was still jammed in place. About three-quarters of an hour later, Tecumseh struck a "torpedo" and sank rapidly. Winnebago took on board 10 survivors from the ill-fated Tecumseh who had been rescued by a boat from Metacomet under heavy fire and passed Ft. Morgan at 08:30. After Tennessee first attacked Stevens' former command, the gunboat Oneida, he was able to interpose Winnebago between the two ships in case the Confederate ironclad turned around for another attack, but it disengaged and briefly sought the shelter of Ft. Morgan's guns. Around 09:10 the traversing gear for the rear turret broke down, only five minutes before Winnebago received the order to attack the Tennessee after it had sortied into the middle of Mobile Bay to attack the Union squadron. The monitor was forced to turn the entire ship to bring her guns to bear and did not play a significant part in the second phase of the battle before Tennessee was forced to surrender at 09:45. During the battle, Winnebago was hit 19 times, three of which penetrated the deck near her aft turret, although she suffered no casualties. Despite the problems with her turrets, the ship managed to fire 56 shells, a mixture of solid shot, explosive shells, grapeshot, canister shot, and shrapnel shells.

Winnebago intermittently bombarded Fort Morgan and Fort Gaines until they surrendered, on 24 and 6 August, respectively. On the night of 8 August, Commander Stevens sent a boat crew under the command of Acting Ensign Michael Murphy on a successful mission to cut the telegraph cable between Fort Morgan and the city of Mobile. The fort surrendered on 24 August and the ship remained at Mobile Bay into 1865 supporting Union forces. On 27 March, Union forces advanced on Spanish Fort as the first step in capturing Mobile. The Navy's role was to bombard the defenses and to interdict their communications with Mobile, but the defenders had sown mines in great numbers in the waterways. The Navy successfully swept many of these, but could not completely clear the rivers.

Winnebago and her sister Milwaukee sailed upriver on 28 March to attack a Confederate transport and forced it to retreat, but Milwaukee struck a mine, in an area previously swept, as they were returning downriver. She remained afloat forward, which permitted her crew to escape without loss. Winnebago later protected a convoy carrying some 13,000 troops under Major General Frederick Steele, to Selma and Montgomery, Alabama later in April. By 28 April, the monitor, together with the gunboats USS Octorara and Sebago, was blockading the Confederate ironclad Nashville and the gunboat Morgan up the Tombigbee River, until their surrender.

Winnebago was placed in ordinary on the Algiers side of the Mississippi, across from New Orleans, on 27 September. She was renamed twice during that time, first to Tornado on 15 June 1869 and then she resumed her original name on 10 August 1869. Winnebago was sold at auction on 12 September 1874.
