= Union Iron Works (St. Louis) =

The Union Iron Works (first known as Carondelet Marine Railway Company and later as Union Marine Works) was a shipbuilding and engineering firm in Carondelet, St. Louis, Missouri, United States.

It was founded in the 1850s by Primus Emerson as the Carondelet Marine Railway Company. It sat where Marceau Street, off South Broadway, met the Mississippi River. The yard had tracks and cranes that could haul ships in or out of the river using a railway car that descended into the water, mated with a ship's hull, and was hauled up the bank and into one of a handful of sheds. The yard employed 800 artisans, laborers and shipwrights.

In 1861, riverboat salvager and engineer James Eads leased the yard and used it to build ironclads for the Union Navy during the American Civil War. In 1869 and 1870, facilities of the Union Iron Works were used by William Nelson and Co. to fabricate the caissons used to build Eads Bridge.

== Ironclad boats constructed at Union Iron Works between 1861 and 1864 ==
City-class gunboats constructed at Union Iron Works

- USS Carondelet
- USS Louisville
- USS Pittsburgh
- USS St. Louis (Renamed Baron DeKalb)

City-class boats built by James Eads & Co. at the Mound City Marine Railway and Shipyard

- USS Cairo
- USS Cincinnati
- USS Mound City

Milwaukee-class monitors constructed at Union Iron Works

- USS Milwaukee
- USS Winnebago

Milwaukee-class monitors constructed by others under subcontract to Union Iron Works

- USS Chickasaw (subcontract by Gaylord, Son & Co, St. Louis)
- USS Kickapoo (subcontract by G.B. Allen & Co, St. Louis)

Neosho-class monitors

- Neosho
- Osage
