= List of shipwrecks in March 1865 =

The list of shipwrecks in March 1865 includes ships sunk, foundered, grounded, or otherwise lost during March 1865.

== 1 March ==
List of shipwrecks: 1 March 1865
Ship	State	Description
Atalanta	United Kingdom	The dredger was run into by the steamship Zealous (United Kingdom) and sank at Harwich, Essex. Her crew were rescued.
USS Harvest Moon	United States Navy	The wreck of USS Harvest Moon, ca. 1963 American Civil War: The sidewheel gunboat, serving as the flagship of Rear Admiral John A. Dahlgren, sank with the loss of one life five minutes after striking a Confederate mine in the Swash Channel in Winyah Bay in South Carolina. Her survivors, including Dahlgren, were rescued by the gunboat USS Nipsic (United States Navy). After being stripped, her wreck was abandoned on 20 or 21 April.
Nugget	(United Kingdom of Great Britain and Ireland) New Zealand	The schooner ran aground and sank in the Grey River.
Ocean	United Kingdom	The ship was driven ashore at Filey, Yorkshire. She was on a voyage from London to Stirling.
Providence	United Kingdom	The ship was driven ashore at Cruden Bay, Aberdeenshire. She was on a voyage from Sunderland, County Durham Findhorn, Moray. She was refloated and sailed for Aberdeen.
Saucy Lass	United Kingdom	The smack ran aground off Great Yarmouth, Norfolk and was abandoned. Her crew were rescued. She was taken in to Great Yarmouth in a derelict condition.

== 2 March ==
List of shipwrecks: 2 March 1865
Ship	State	Description
Anne	United Kingdom	The schooner was driven ashore at Lindisfarne, Northumberland. She was on a voyage from Ipswich, Suffolk to Inverness. She was refloated and resumed her voyage.
Elizabeth and Hannah	United Kingdom	The schooner was driven ashore and wrecked near Dunbar, Lothian. Her crew were rescued. She was inwards for Dunbar in tow from Leith when the towrope broke.
Exmouth	United Kingdom	The schooner foundered 12 nautical miles (22 km) north of the North Foreland, Kent. Her crew were rescued. She was on a voyage from Middlesbrough, Yorkshire to Swansea, Glamorgan.
James Watson	United States	Carrying 86 Union Army soldiers and cargo, the 200-ton sternwheel paddle steamer burned on the Mississippi River at Island Number 76 between Bolivar County, Mississippi, and Desha County, Arkansas, with the loss of 35 lives.
Jemmy	France	The schooner ran aground on the Amford Bank. She consequently put in to Honfleur, Manche in a severely leaky condition.
Nettie Hartupee	United States	The 81-ton sternwheel paddle steamer burned on the Ohio River at Pomeroy, Ohio.
Prompt	United Kingdom	The steamship was driven ashore by ice at Hamburg. She was on a voyage from West Hartlepool, County Durham to Hamburg.
CSS Rob Roy	Confederate States Navy	American Civil War, Union blockade: Fleeing from an armed boat from the schooner USS Fox (United States Navy) during a blockade-running voyage with a cargo of cavalry sabers and farming and mechanical implements, the 66-ton schooner was run ashore and burned by her crew in Deadman's Bay on the coast of Florida.
Sveridge	United Kingdom	The schooner capsized and sank at Fernando Po, Spanish Guinea.

== 3 March ==
List of shipwrecks: 3 March 1865
Ship	State	Description
Campsie	United Kingdom	The barque ran aground on Cay Francis.
Dart	(United Kingdom of Great Britain and Ireland) Jersey	The ship ran aground on the Pennington Spit, in the Solent. She was on a voyage from Jersey to Llanelly, Glamorgan.
Elena	United Kingdom	The whaler, a barque, was driven ashore on Bressay, Shetland Islands. She floated off the next day but was driven onto a rock and severely damaged. She was on a voyage from Peterhead, Aberdeenshire to Greenland. She was refloated on 27 March.
Marianne	Hamburg	The ship was damaged by ice at List, Duchy of Holstein. She was on a voyage from Genoa, Italy to Hamburg.
HMS Niger	Royal Navy	The Niger-class corvette ran aground in the River Thames at Greenhithe, Kent. She was on a voyage from Woolwich, Kent to the West Indies. She was refloated and taken in to Chatham, Kent for repairs.

== 4 March ==
List of shipwrecks: 4 March 1865
Ship	State	Description
Industry	United Kingdom	The sloop was driven ashore at Anstruther, Fife. She was on a voyage from Arbroath, Forfarshire to Glasgow, Renfrewshire.
Maggie Lorimer	United Kingdom	The schooner ran aground at Calais, France and was damaged. She was on a voyage from Grangemouth, Stirlingshire to Calais. She was refloated and taken in to Calais for repairs.
Mazeppa	Norway	The schooner ran aground and sank at Tallakshavn, Østerøya. She was on a voyage from Grangemouth to Christiania.
Thorn	United States Army	American Civil War: The 403-ton screw transport sank without loss of life two minutes after striking a Confederate mine on the Cape Fear River in North Carolina below Fort Anderson.
Victoria	United Kingdom	The smack was driven ashore near Wexford. She was on a voyage from Dublin to Wexford.

== 5 March ==
List of shipwrecks: 5 March 1865
Ship	State	Description
Batallion	United Kingdom	The steamship ran aground off the mouth of the Oste. She was on a voyage from Leith, Lothian to Cuxhaven.
Charles Gumm	(United Kingdom of Great Britain and Ireland) British North America	The barque ran aground on the Till, in the North Sea and was abandoned by her crew. She was on a voyage from Philadelphia, Pennsylvania, United States to Hamburg. She was later refloated with the assistance of three steamships.
George and Elizabeth	United Kingdom	The brig ran aground on the Haisborough Sands, in the North Sea off the coast of Norfolk. She was on a voyage from Sunderland, County Durham to Schiedam, South Holland, Netherlands. She was refloated and taken in to Great Yarmouth, Norfolk in a leaky condition.

== 6 March ==
List of shipwrecks: 6 March 1865
Ship	State	Description
Brancepeth	United Kingdom	The steamship ran aground at Sunderland, County Durham. She was refloated.
Endeavour	United Kingdom	The sloop foundered off Abraham's Wyke, Yorkshire. Her crew survived. She was on a voyage from South Shields, County Durham to King's Lynn, Norfolk.
Spring	United Kingdom	The schooner was driven ashore in the Farne Islands, Northumberland. Her crew were rescued. She was on a voyage from London to Dundee, Forfarshire. She was refloated the next day and taken in to North Sunderland, County Durham in a severely leaky condition.
Stephen Bayard	United States	The 155-ton sternwheel paddle steamer burned on the Mississippi River at Memphis, Tennessee.

== 7 March ==
List of shipwrecks: 7 March 1865
Ship	State	Description
Edith	United Kingdom	The steamship ran aground at Sunderland, County Durham. She was refloated.

== 8 March ==
List of shipwrecks: 8 March 1865
Ship	State	Description
Elizabeth Rose	United Kingdom	The brig was driven ashore on Tory Island, County Donegal. She was on a voyage from Ardrossan, Ayrshire to Port-au-Prince, Haiti. She was refloated and towed in to Moville, County Donegal.
Lord Brougham	United Kingdom	The ship was wrecked in the Laccadive Islands.
Margaret	United Kingdom	The ship was wrecked on the Engelsmansplaat, in the North Sea. Her crew were rescued.

== 10 March ==
List of shipwrecks: 10 March 1865
Ship	State	Description
Bertha	United Kingdom	The ship ran aground on the Demroof Bank, in the Irish Sea off the coast of Cumberland and was wrecked. She was on a voyage from Whitehaven, Cumberland to Cardiff, Glamorgan.
Cabot	Flag unknown	The brig sank at Mendocino, California.
Emily Allison	Flag unknown	The brig was one of several ships lost during a cyclone that hit the North Island. The ship ran ashore and was split amidships at Wanganui.
Fitzhenry	United Kingdom	The sloop sprang a leak and was assisted in to Dundee, Forfarshire in a waterlogged condition. She was on a voyage from Dundee to Campbeltown, Argyllshire.
Flatrock	United Kingdom	The sloop was wrecked on Taylor's Bank, in Liverpool Bay. Her three crew were rescued by the Formby Lifeboat.
Maria Jane	(United Kingdom of Great Britain and Ireland) New Zealand	The schooner was one of several ships lost during a cyclone that hit the North Island. The ship, travelling from Tauranga, was wrecked after being swamped by giant waves near Whangamata. Of the three on board, only one survived.
Nebuchadnezzar	(United Kingdom of Great Britain and Ireland) New Zealand	The schooner was one of several ships lost during a cyclone that hit the North Island. She is believed to have foundered with all men on board being lost after last being seen off the heads of the Manukau Harbour during the gale. No trace was ever found of her.
Wildfire	(United Kingdom of Great Britain and Ireland) New Zealand	The schooner was one of several ships lost during a cyclone which hit the North Island. The ship was wrecked near Whangarei Heads whilst en route from Hokianga to Auckland, with the loss of all four crew.

== 11 March ==
List of shipwrecks: 11 March 1865
Ship	State	Description
Annie Doyle	Flag unknown	The schooner was wrecked on the Yaquina Bar at the mouth of the Yaquina River in Yaquina Bay on the coast of Oregon, Confederate States of America.

== 12 March ==
List of shipwrecks: 12 March 1865
Ship	State	Description
USS Althea	United States Navy	American Civil War:Battle of Spanish Fort:, Battle of Fort Blakeley: The 72-ton tug sank immediately after striking a Confederate mine on the Blakeley River in Alabama. Two of her crew were killed and three were injured. She was raised and repaired, and she was recommissioned on 7 November.
Lina	Kingdom of Hanover	The schooner foundered in the Mediterranean Sea (36°47′N 16°00′E). Her crew were rescued by the barque Hellas (Prussia). Lina was on a voyage from Piraeus, Greece to London.
Tussin	United Kingdom	The ship departed from Falmouth, Cornwall for Galway. No further trace, presumed foundered with the loss of all hands.

== 13 March ==
List of shipwrecks: 13 March 1865
Ship	State	Description
Atlas	United Kingdom	The steamship sprang a leak and sank off Inchcape, Forfarshire. Her crew were rescued. She was on a voyage from Granton, Lothian to Liverpool, Lancashire.
Gazehound	United Kingdom	The 380-ton barque broke free of her moorings and was driven ashore while loading wool at Oamaru, New Zealand during a heavy storm (the remnants of a cyclone which had earlier struck the North Island (see March 10).
Margaret Davies	United Kingdom	The ship was wrecked at Middle Point, near Calcutta, India.
Sailor	United Kingdom	The ship was driven ashore in the Dardanelles. She was on a voyage from Alexandria, Egypt to Constantinople, Ottoman Empire. She was refloated on 15 March and taken in to Constantinople.

== 14 March ==
List of shipwrecks: 14 March 1865
Ship	State	Description
Caldwell	Confederate States of America	The 51-ton sternwheel paddle steamer burned at Fayetteville, North Carolina.
Clarendon	Confederate States of America	American Civil War: The 143-ton screw steamer was captured and burned by Union forces at Fayetteville.
Glensannox	United Kingdom	The ship was wrecked at Bombay, India. She was on a voyage from Liverpool, Lancashire to Bombay.
CSS Neuse	Confederate States Navy	American Civil War: The steam-powered ironclad ram was burned in the Neuse River (35°16′1.33″N 77°37′17.8″W) to prevent her capture by Union forces.

== 15 March ==
List of shipwrecks: 15 March 1865
Ship	State	Description
Dorothy	United Kingdom	The schooner ran aground at Gallow End, Forfarshire. Her crew were rescued. She was on a voyage from Seaham, County Durham to Dundee, Forfarshire. She capsized and sank the next day.
Industry	United States	The 300-ton barque was wrecked on the Middle Sands at the entrance to the Columbia River on the coast of Oregon, Confederate States of America with the loss of 17 lives.
Manchester	United Kingdom	The ship sprang a leak and was beached at Aldeburgh, Suffolk. She was on a voyage from Ramsgate, Kent to Hartlepool, County Durham. She was refloated and taken in to Orford Haven.
Margaret	United Kingdom	The brig ran aground on the Wierumergronden, in the North Sea off the Dutch coast. She was on a voyage from Sunderland, County Durham to Geestemünde. She was refloated on 19 April and towed in to Groningen, Netherlands by the steamship Time is Money (United Kingdom).
Thompson	United Kingdom	The ship ran aground on the Winterton Ridge, in the North Sea off the coast of Norfolk. Shw as on a voyage from Sunderland, County Durham to Dordrecht, South Holland, Netherlands. She was refloated and put in to Lowestoft, Suffolk in a leaky condition.

== 16 March ==
List of shipwrecks: 16 March 1865
Ship	State	Description
Challenger	United Kingdom	The barque was wrecked at Terranova di Sicilia, Sicily, Italy. Her crew were rescued.
Fanny	United Kingdom	The barque ran aground at Alexandria, Egypt Eyalet. She was on a voyage from Cardiff, Glamorgan to Alexandria.
George S. Wright	United States	The 199-ton screw steamer was lost.
In Te Spes	United Kingdom	The ship was sighted off the Isle of Wight whilst on her maiden voyage, from Sunderland, County Durham to Bombay, India. No further trace, presumed foundered with the loss of all 30 crew.
Sarah Ann	United Kingdom	The ship ran aground on the Brag of Briggs. She was on a voyage from Arklow, County Wicklow to Belfast, County Antrim. She was refloated and take in to Belfast.
S. D. Lewis	United States	The brig ran aground on Clatsop Spit at the entrance to the Columbia River on the coast of Oregon, Confederate States of America and was dashed to pieces by the surf with no loss of life.
Trois Amis	France	The ship was driven ashore at Licata, Sicily, Italy.
Van Capellan	United Kingdom	The full-rigged ship foundered in the Indian Ocean with the loss of nine of her sixteen crew. Survivors were rescued by Naturalist (United Kingdom). Van Capellan was on a voyage from Calcutta, India for Hull, Yorkshire.
Unidentified vessels	Confederate States of America	American Civil War: The armed screw steamer USS Don and armed sidewheel paddle steamers USS Heliotrope and USS Stepping Stones (all United States Navy) destroyed three schooners and four small boats on Mattox Creek in Westmoreland County, Virginia.

== 17 March ==
List of shipwrecks: 17 March 1865
Ship	State	Description
Bezaleel	United Kingdom	The ship foundered in the Bay of Biscay. She was on a voyage from Cardiff, Glamorgan to Lisbon, Portugal.
Botassio	Italy	The steamship was lost off Reggio di Calabria with the loss of a crew member. She was on a voyage from Corfu, Greece to London, United Kingdom.
Dart	United Kingdom	The schooner sank at Whitby, Yorkshire.
Matchless	United Kingdom	The ship schooner was wrecked at "Maranset", Mauritius.

== 18 March ==
List of shipwrecks: 18 March 1865
Ship	State	Description
Ellen, or Helen	United Kingdom	The ship was holed by her anchor and severely damaged at Penzance, Cornwall. She was on a voyage from Shoreham-by-Sea, Sussex to Penzance.
Freyer	Norway	The ship ran aground on the Gamalen Bank, in the North Sea off the Dutch coast. She was refloated and assisted in to Hellevoetsluis, Zeeland, Netherlands.
Greyhound	United Kingdom	The ship was presumed to have foundered in the North Sea. Wreckage washed up 4 nautical miles (7.4 km) south of Bridlington, Yorkshire.
Lewes Castle	United Kingdom	The ship was driven ashore at Crygill, Anglesey. Her crew survived. She became a wreck the next day.
Mexico	United States	The 120-ton sidewheel paddle steamer burned at Point Isabel, Texas, Confederate States of America.
Sandringham	United Kingdom	The ship was lost at Mauritius with the loss of twenty lives.
Ville de Bonne	France	The steamship struck a rock near Tunis, Tunisia and was severely damaged.

== 19 March ==
List of shipwrecks: 19 March 1865
Ship	State	Description
Adelaide	United Kingdom	The schooner was abandoned in the Atlantic Ocean off Land's End, Cornwall. Her crew were rescued by Earl of Derby (United Kingdom). She was on a voyage from Newport, Monmouthshire to Southampton, Hampshire.
Adolphe	France	The brig was driven ashore and severely damaged at Swansea, Glamorgan, United Kingdom. She was refloated and towed in to Swansea.
Border Chieftain	United Kingdom	The brig ran aground and was wrecked at South Shields, County Durham. All eight people on board were rescued by the South Shields Lifeboat Constance ( Royal National Lifeboat Institution).
British Queen	United Kingdom	The ship struck the breakwater at Dover, Kent and sank. She was on a voyage from Portland, Dorset to London. She was refloated the next day.
Burton	United Kingdom	The schooner was driven ashore and wrecked at Tynemouth, Northumberland with the loss of all but one of her five crew. The survivor was rescued by the South Shields Lifeboat Constance ( Royal National Lifeboat Institution). Burton was on a voyage from South Shields to London.
Clementina	United Kingdom	The schooner foundered off Land's End, Cornwall. Her crew were rescued by Edward Searle (United Kingdom). Clementina was on a voyage from Newport, Monmouthshire to Plymouth, Devon.
Dalila	France	The ship was driven ashore and wrecked at Dundalk, County Louth, United Kingdom. Her crew were rescued by rocket apparatus. She was on a voyage from Marans, Charente-Inférieure to Belfast, County Antrim, United Kingdom. She was refloated on 23 March and taken in to Dundalk.
Dolphin	United Kingdom	The schooner was driven ashore at Lowestoft, Suffolk. Her crew were rescued. She was on a voyage from Colchester, Essex to Goole, East Riding of Yorkshire.
Eclipse	United Kingdom	The brigantine was abandoned off the Cornish coast. Her crew were rescued by a pilot boat and the St. Ives Lifeboat.
Edgar	United Kingdom	The brig was driven ashore and wrecked at Great Yarmouth, Norfolk. Her nine crew were rescued by rocket apparatus. She was on a voyage from Cardiff, Glamorgan to Hamburg.
Elizabeth	United Kingdom	The ship was wrecked at Tynewater, Lothian with the loss of all hands. She was on a voyage from Hartlepool, County Durham to London.
Favourite, Rosetta, and Pearl	United Kingdom	Favourite ran aground coming in to Hartlepool, County Durham. The brig Rosetta then ran aground on the Fish Sands avoiding Favourite. She was run into by Pearl, both vessels being severely damaged. Favourite was refloated with assistance from the tugs Amelia and Thomas & Mary (both United Kingdom).
Henry Peterson	United Kingdom	The schooner was driven ashore at Arklow, County Wicklow. Her five crew were rescued by rocket apparatus. She was on a voyage from Liverpool, Lancashire to Cork.
Kate	United Kingdom	The ship collided with Ann Williams (United Kingdom) and foundered. Her crew were rescued by Ann Williams. Kate was on a voyage from Saint-Valery-sur-Somme, Somme, France to Penzance, Cornwall. Her wreck came ashore at Mousehole, Cornwall
Mary	United Kingdom	The gabbart was driven ashore at Gourock, Renfrewshire. She was refloated on 21 March.
Mary Elizabeth	United Kingdom	The sloop was beached on the Sunk Sand, in the Humber and was abandoned by her crew. She was on a voyage from King's Lynn, Norfolk to Rotterdam, South Holland, Netherlands. She was refloated on 22 March and taken in to Hull, Yorkshire.
Northumbrian	United Kingdom	The ship collided with Silistria (United Kingdom) and was beached at Grimsby Lincolnshire. She had broken up by 22 March.
Princess Victoria	United Kingdom	The brig was driven ashore at Lowestoft. Her crew were rescued by rocket apparatus. She was on a voyage from Boulogne, Pas-de-Calais, France to Blyth, Northumberland. She was refloated on 23 March and taken in to Lowestoft.
Sunflower	United Kingdom	The brig was driven ashore at Godrevy, Cornwall. Her crew were rescued. She was Bordeaux, Gironde, France to Cardiff, Glamorgan.
Teaser	United Kingdom	The schooner was driven ashore and wrecked at Curracloe, County Wexford with the loss of all but one of those on board. She was on a voyage from Dunkirk, Nord, France to Barrow-in-Furness, Lancashire.
Arklow Lifeboat	United Kingdom	The lifeboat was driven against the pier at Arklow and was severely damaged.
Unnamed	United Kingdom	A total of 63 barges sank at Bugsby's Hole, in the River Thames at Erith, Kent.
Unnamed	United Kingdom	The barge sank in the River Thames at Blackwall, Middlesex.
Unnamed	United Kingdom	The barge sank in Bugsby's Reach, in the River Thames.
Unnamed	United Kingdom	Five of six barges sank at the mouth of the River Thames.
Unnamed	United Kingdom	The barge sank in the River Thames at Barking, Essex.

== 20 March ==
List of shipwrecks: 20 March 1865
Ship	State	Description
Eager	United Kingdom	The ship was driven ashore at Yarmouth, Isle of Wight. Her crew were rescued. She was on a voyage from Milford on Sea, Hampshire to Cardiff, Glamorgan.
Elizabeth	United Kingdom	The ship was wrecked at Dunbar, Lothian with the loss of all hands.
Ino	United Kingdom	The brigantine was driven ashore at Dungeness, Kent. She was on a voyage from Hartlepool, Count Durham to Dieppe, Seine-Inférieure, France. She was later refloated and taken in to Folkestone, Kent in a leaky condition.
Lennox	United Kingdom	The paddle steamer was holed by an anchor and was beached in the Clyde.
Lydia Jane	United Kingdom	The brig was driven ashore at Harwich, Essex.
Mitre	United Kingdom	The ship struck the breakwater at Bude, Cornwall and was damaged.
Pfeil	Hamburg	The schooner ran aground on the Newcombe Sand, in the North Sea off the coast of Suffolk, United Kingdom. Her seven crew were rescued by the Lowestoft Lifeboat. She was on a voyage from Hamburg to Buenos Aires, Argentina. She was taken in to Lowestoft, Suffolk in a derelict condition.

== 21 March ==
List of shipwrecks: 21 March 1865
Ship	State	Description
Joseph Wellidon	Netherlands	The ship ran aground at Nieuwesluis, North Holland. She was on a voyage from Batavia, Netherlands East Indies to Amsterdam, North Holland.
Swallow	United Kingdom	The ship was wrecked near Castletownshend, County Cork. Her crew were rescued. She was on a voyage from Swansea, Glamorgan to Kenmare, County Cork.
William	United Kingdom	The ship ran aground at Sunderland, County Durham. She was on a voyage from Arundel, Sussex to Sunderland. She was refloated.

== 22 March ==
List of shipwrecks: 22 March 1865
Ship	State	Description
Ann Griffiths	United Kingdom	The ship ran aground on the Dem Sand, in the North Sea. She was on a voyage from Portmadoc, Caernarfonshire to Hamburg.
Eliza Beynon	United Kingdom	The schooner was driven ashore at Stolford, Somerset. She was on a voyage from Newport, Monmouthshire to Bridgwater, Somerset. She was refloated the next day with the assistance of a steamship and taken in to Bridgwater.
Ernte	Kingdom of Hanover	The schooner ran aground on the Barrow Sand, in the North Sea off the coast of Essex, United Kingdom. She was on a voyage from Hamburg to Maceió, Brazil. She was refloated with the assistance of a number of smacks and was assisted in to the River Colne.
Iron Duke	United Kingdom	The flat ran aground on the Gore, in the Bristol Channel. She was refloated the next day.
Mohawk	United Kingdom	The ship was driven ashore at Wexford. She was on a voyage from Newport, Monmouthshire to Africa.
Parker	United Kingdom	The ship ran aground near Demerara, British Honduras. She was on a voyage from Demerara to Liverpool, Lancashire

== 23 March ==
List of shipwrecks: 23 March 1865
Ship	State	Description
Caucasus	United Kingdom	The barque ran aground on the Goodwin Sands, Kent. She was on a voyage from South Shields, County Durham to Colombo, Ceylon. She was refloated with the assistance of a Trinity House steamship and resumed her voyage, but later put in to Plymouth, Devon for examination.
Charles Miller	United States	The 93-ton sternwheel paddle steamer sank with the loss of two lives in the Cumberland River about 12 miles (19 km) below Nashville, Tennessee.
Salathiel	United Kingdom	The schooner was driven ashore at "Mucklewick", Pembrokeshire. She was on a voyage from Cardiff, Glamorgan to Liverpool, Lancashire. She was refloated and resumed her voyage.

== 24 March ==
List of shipwrecks: 24 March 1865
Ship	State	Description
Balaclava	United Kingdom	The steamship was wrecked at Tacumshane, County Wexford. She was on a voyage from Woolwich, Kent to Liverpool, Lancashire.
Fife Packet	United Kingdom	The ship was driven ashore and wrecked at Londonderry. She was on a voyage from Coleraine, County Antrim to Londonderry.
Onward	United Kingdom	The paddle tug collided with a steamship and sank at North Shields, Northumberland. She was refloated the next day and beached. Subsequently repaired and returned to service.

== 26 March ==
List of shipwrecks: 26 March 1865
Ship	State	Description
Ann and Isabel	United Kingdom	The ship was abandoned off Morup, Sweden. Her crew were rescued by Harvest Home (United Kingdom). Ann and Isabel was on a voyage from South Shields, County Durham to Stettin.
Fusileer	United Kingdom	The full-rigged ship was wrecked on the coast of Natal. She was on a voyage from Calcutta, India to Demerara, British Guiana.
Guardian	United Kingdom	The brig sprang a leak and foundered in the North Sea 18 nautical miles (33 km) off Scarborough, Yorkshire with the loss of seven of her eight crew. She was on a voyage from Newcastle upon Tyne, Northumberland to Rotterdam, South Holland, Netherlands.
Kate	United Kingdom	The ship was struck by lightning and was abandoned in the North Sea. Her four crew were rescued by the Filey Lifeboat. She was on a voyage from Middlesbrough, Yorkshire to King's Lynn, Norfolk.
Welcome Home	United Kingdom	The ship was driven ashore at Bridlington, Yorkshire. She was on a voyage from King's Lynn to West Hartlepool, County Durham.

== 27 March ==
List of shipwrecks: 27 March 1865
Ship	State	Description
George C. Collins	United States	The 234-ton screw steamer was stranded on the St. Johns River in Florida, Confederate States of America and was wrecked.
Defiance	United Kingdom	The brig was driven ashore at Kessingland, Suffolk. Her crew were rescued by rocket apparatus. She was on a voyage from London to Sunderland, County Durham.
Glasgow Packet	United Kingdom	The schooner was driven ashore and wrecked at Lowestoft, Suffolk. Her crew were rescued.
Jenny R	Austrian Empire	The full-rigged ship was driven ashore at Corton, Suffolk. Seventeen of her crew were rescued by rocket appatatus, the rest reached shore at low tide. She was on a voyage from London to Newcastle upon Tyne, Northumberland, United Kingdom.
Londonderry	United Kingdom	The brig was driven ashore at Corton. Her crew were rescued.
Odd Fellow	United Kingdom	The sloop was run into by the barque Abyssinia and sank at Lowestoft.
Ranger	United Kingdom	The brig was driven ashore at Lowestoft. Her crew were rescued. She was on a voyage from South Shields to London. She was refloated on 30 March and taken in to Lowestoft in a severely leaky condition.

== 28 March ==
List of shipwrecks: 28 March 1865
Ship	State	Description
Adriatic	United States	The sternwheel paddle steamer sank in the Missouri River at the head of Palmyra Bend. She later was refloated and converted into a barge.
Hawthorns	United Kingdom	The steamship ran aground at North Shields, Northumberland. She was refloated and put back to North Shields.
Industry	United Kingdom	The schooner was driven ashore and severely damaged at Berwick upon Tweed, Northumberland. She was on a voyage from Glasgow, Renfrewshire to King's Lynn, Norfolk. She was refloated the next day and taken in to Berwick upon Tweed.
Jane Pirie	United Kingdom	The barque collided with the barque Balder (Sweden) and foundered off Málaga, Spain. Her crew were rescued by Balder.
USS Milwaukee	United States Navy	American Civil War:, Battle of Spanish Fort, Battle of Fort Blakeley: The Milwaukee-class river monitor sank without loss of life after striking a Confederate mine in the Blakeley River in Alabama. Her wreck was raised and scrapped in 1868.

== 29 March ==
List of shipwrecks: 29 March 1865
Ship	State	Description
USS Osage	United States Navy	American Civil War, Battle of Spanish Fort, Battle of Fort Blakeley: The Neosho-class monitor sank with the loss of four crewmen killed and eight wounded after striking a Confederate mine in the Blakeley River in Alabama. Her wreck was raised and was sold in 1867.
Vivid	United Kingdom	The ship was driven ashore in the Gulf of Smyrna.

== 30 March ==
List of shipwrecks: 30 March 1865
Ship	State	Description
Euphemia	United Kingdom	The brig was driven ashore at Flamborough Head, Yorkshire. She was on a voyage from Chatham, Kent to West Hartlepool, County Durham. She was refloated and towed in to Whitby, North Riding of Yorkshire by the tug Kate (United Kingdom).
Malta	United States	The 33-ton sternwheel paddle steamer sank in the Ohio River at Marietta, Ohio.
Nymph	United Kingdom	The brig was driven ashore at Redcar, Yorkshire. She was on a voyage from Middlesbrough, Yorkshire to Swansea, Glamorgan. She was refloated and taken in to Whitby in a leaky condition.
Oil City	United States	The 59- or 106.75-ton sternwheel paddle steamer′s bottom was ripped open when she struck a sunken coal barge in the Ohio River at Wheeling, West Virginia. She sank, and her cabin separated. Her hull and machinery were later salvaged.

== 31 March ==
List of shipwrecks: 31 March 1865
Ship	State	Description
Futty Salaam	India	The ship sank in the Hooghly River at Calcutta. She had been refloated by 4 April.
General Lyon	United States	During a voyage from Wilmington, North Carolina, to Fort Monroe, Virginia, Confederate States of America, the 1,206-ton screw steamer burned and sank in the North Atlantic Ocean off Cape Hatteras, North Carolina, during a storm with hurricane-force winds. Of an estimated 550 to 600 passengers and crew only about 29 survived, rescued by the steam transport General Sedgwick (United States).
Mark R. Cheek	United States	The 122-ton sidewheel paddle steamer burned at Ouachita City, Louisiana, Confederate States of America.

== Unknown date ==
List of shipwrecks: Unknown date in March 1865
Ship	State	Description
Aallotar	China	The ship sprang a leak and sank at "Laguinmaux" before 11 March.
Angler	United Kingdom	Carrying a cargo of coffee and logwood, the schooner was wrecked on Block Island off the coast of Rhode Island, United States.
Australia	United States	The ship was wrecked on the Frying Pan Shoals, off the coast of North Carolina, Confederate States of America. She was on a voyage from New York to Fortress Monroe, Virginia, Confederate States of America.
Berenguer	France	The ship was wrecked at Mazatlán, Mexico.
Bessie Hathaway	United Kingdom	The ship was abandoned off Cape Sable Island, Nova Scotia, British North America. Her crew were rescued. She was on a voyage from Saint John, New Brunswick, British North America to Liverpool, Lancashire.
Dart	United Kingdom	The ship was wrecked on Caye Bagoro. She was on a voyage from Liverpool to Sagua La Grande, Cuba.
Defiance	United Kingdom	The brig was driven ashore at Kessingland, Suffolk. She was on a voyage from London to Sunderland, County Durham.
Duke of Beaufort	United Kingdom	The ship struck a rock at St. Jago de Cuba, Cuba and was wrecked. She was on a voyage from Swansea, Glamorgan to St. Jago de Cuba.
Eleazer	United Kingdom	The ship was driven ashore in Ardmore Bay. She was on a voyage from Cardiff, Glamorgan to Waterford.
Engelbert Hargog von Arenburg	Kingdom of Hanover	The ship foundered. She was on a voyage from Marseille, Bouches-du-Rhône, France to Great Yarmouth, Norfolk, United Kingdom.
Goldhunter	United Kingdom	The brig was wrecked on the American coast. Her crew were rescued.
James Stockman	United States	American Civil War:The schooner was burned on the Blood River in Louisiana, Confederate States of America after being captured 1.5 nautical miles (2.8 km) from the mouth of the Amite River by a Confederate States Navy boat expedition.
Julia	United Kingdom	The ship was wrecked on Silver Key. She was on a voyage from Newport, Monmouthshire to Port-au-Prince, Haiti.
Malibran	United Kingdom	The ship foundered in the English Channel off the Isle of Wight before 6 March.
Margaret Kerr	United Kingdom	The full-rigged ship was wrecked at Key West, Florida, Confederate States of America on or before 10 March. Her crew were rescued.
Martha	United Kingdom	The ship ran aground in Gibraltar Bay.
Nugget	(United Kingdom of Great Britain and Ireland) New Zealand	Around the beginning of March, the cutter's anchor chain broke at Greymouth, and she drifted over the bar at the mouth of the Grey River, holing her, and out to sea. One of the two men on board made it back to shore, the other drowned.
Ondine	United Kingdom	The barque was wrecked at Punta Mulas, Puerto Rico before 10 March. Her fourteen crew were rescued by the steamship Moise (Spain).
Perseverante	Flag unknown	The ship was wrecked near "Vigri", Ottoman Empire.
Pytho	United Kingdom	The brig sank near Brouwershaven, Zeeland, Netherlands.
Ranger	United Kingdom	The ship was driven ashore at North Shields, Northumberland. She was on a voyage from South Shields to London.
Rose	France	The ship was driven ashore at Cape Spartel, Morocco. She was on a voyage from Morlaix, Finistère to Marseille, Bouches-du-Rhône.
Rubens	Chile	The ship was wrecked at Mazatlán.
Seine	France	The steamship was wrecked at Cape Spartivento, Sardinia, Italy. Her crew were rescued.
CSS Spray	Confederate States Navy	American Civil War: The gunboat was burned or scuttled at St. Marks, Florida to prevent capture by Union forces, probably on the 4 or 5 March.
Sylph	(United Kingdom of Great Britain and Ireland) New Zealand	The 47-ton schooner was wrecked on a sandbar at Hokitika, where she was arriving from Lyttelton.
Trumbull	United States	The ship was destroyed by fire at Akyab, Burma.
William and Sarah	United Kingdom	The ship ran aground on the Schulthoek, off Hellevoetsluis, Zeeland, Netherlands. She was on a voyage from Newcastle upon Tyne, Northumberland to Hellevoetsluius. She was refloated on 6 March and taken in to Hellevoetsluis.
Unidentified vessels	Confederate States of America	American Civil War:The vessels, one of them a tender, were burned and sunk on the Pee Dee River110 nautical miles (200 km) upstream of Georgetown, South Carolina to prevent their capture by Union forces.
