= Milwaukee-class monitor =

United States Navy's Milwaukee-class riverine ironclad monitors

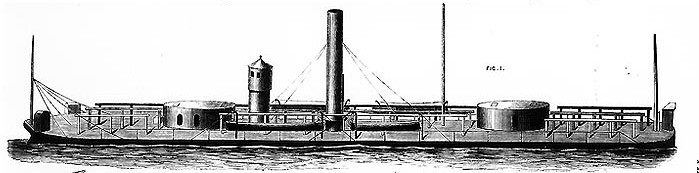
- An 1866 drawing of USS Chickasaw

Class overview
- Name: Milwaukee class
- Builders: Union Iron Works, MO (2); G.B. Allen & Co., MO (1); Thomas G. Gaylord & Sons, MO (1)
- Operators: United States Navy
- Preceded by: USS Ozark
- Succeeded by: Marietta class
- Cost: Approximately $390,000
- Built: 1863–65
- Completed: 4
- Lost: 1
- Scrapped: 3

General characteristics
- Type: River monitor
- Displacement: 1,300 long tons (1,300 t)
- Tons burthen: 970 bm
- Length: 229 ft (69.8 m)
- Beam: 56 ft (17.1 m)
- Draft: 6 ft (1.8 m)
- Depth: 8 ft 6 in (2.6 m)
- Installed power: 7 × Tubular boilers
- Propulsion: 4 × Shafts; 2 × Non-condensing steam engines
- Speed: 9 knots (17 km/h; 10 mph)
- Complement: 138
- Armament: 2 × 2 - 11-inch (279 mm) Smoothbore Dahlgren guns
- Armor: Gun turrets: 8 in (203 mm); Side: 3 in (76 mm); Deck: .75–1.5 in (19–38 mm); Conning tower: 3 in (76 mm)

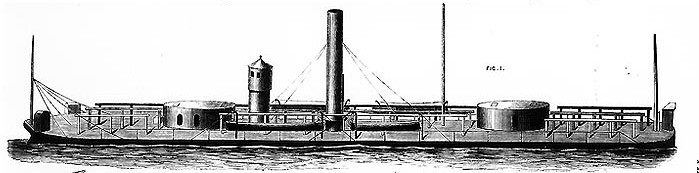

The Milwaukee-class monitors were a class of four riverine ironclad monitors built during the American Civil War. Several supported Union forces along the Mississippi River in mid-1864 before participating in the Battle of Mobile Bay in August. Chickasaw and Winnebago bombarded Confederate coastal fortifications during the battle and during subsequent operations as well as engaging the ironclad Tennessee II. The other two ships arrived at Mobile Bay after the battle and all four supported the land attacks on Mobile in March–April 1865. Milwaukee struck a torpedo during this time and sank. The surviving three ships were sold in 1874; Chickasaw was converted into a ferry and survived until 1944 when she was scuttled. Her wreck was discovered in 2004.

== Design and description ==
The Milwaukee-class monitors had their origin in an order from Gideon Welles, Secretary of the Navy, to Commodore Joseph Smith, Chief of the Bureau of Yards and Docks, on 16 April 1863 to recommend four more river ironclads that could mount four 11-inch (279 mm) Dahlgren guns on a draft no more than 6 feet (1.8 m). James Eads received the contract to build four iron-hulled, twin-turreted ironclads, partly due to the influence of Missouri Congressman Frank P. Blair Jr. Eads retained two of the ships, but subcontracted the other two to other builders.

The Milwaukee-class ships were 229 feet (69.8 m) long overall and had a beam of 56 feet (17.1 m). They had a depth of hold of 8 feet 6 inches (2.6 m) and a draft of six feet. The ships were 970 tons burthen and displaced 1,300 long tons (1,300 t).

They were powered by two 2-cylinder horizontal non-condensing steam engines, each driving two 7-foot-6-inch (2.3 m) propellers, using steam generated by seven tubular boilers. The engines were designed to reach a top speed of 9 knots (17 km/h; 10 mph). They had a bore of 26 inches (660 mm) and a stroke of 24 inches (610 mm). They carried 156 long tons (159 t) of coal.

The ships' main armament consisted of four smoothbore, muzzle-loading 11-inch Dahlgren guns mounted in two twin-gun turrets. The fore turret in each ship, except Chickasaw, was designed by Eads, while the aft turret was the standard Ericsson design used in most Union monitors. Unlike the latter, which rested its entire weight on a central spindle that had to be elevated in order for the turret to rotate, Eads' design better distributed its weight because it rested on a number of ball bearings underneath the outer edge of the turret. The structure of the Eads turret extended down to be bottom of the ship and the entire structure rotated. The guns in the Eads turret were mounted on a steam-powered platform that moved up and down, so that the guns could be reloaded below deck, safe from enemy interference. Both turrets used steam engines to rotate, but the Eads design also used it to power virtually every function in the turret, including running out the guns, absorbing the recoil from firing, and opening the gun ports to allow the guns to fire. The ability to adjust the level of the turret floor doubled the elevation of the guns to +20° compared to the +10° allowed in an Ericsson turret. Another advantage was that the Eads turret only required a crew of six men, far fewer than the Ericsson design. Each gun weighed approximately 16,000 pounds (7,300 kg). They could fire a 136-pound (61.7 kg) shell up to a range of 3,650 yards (3,340 m) at an elevation of +15°.

The cylindrical turrets were protected by eight layers of wrought iron 1-inch (25 mm) plates above the deck. Below the deck the side of the Eads turret was only a single layer thick and had holes through which the guns were loaded. The sides of the hull consisted of three layers of one-inch plates, backed by 15 inches (380 mm) of pine. The deck was heavily cambered to allow headroom for the crew on such a shallow draft, and it consisted of iron plates .75 inches (19 mm) thick. Milwaukee and Winnebago had an additional layer of armor to give them a total of 1.5 inches (38 mm). The pilothouse, positioned behind and above the fore turret, was protected by 3 inches (76 mm) of armor.

== Ships ==
Construction data
Ship	Builder	Namesake	Renamed	Laid down	Launched	Commissioned
Chickasaw	Thomas G. Gaylord, St. Louis, Missouri	Chickasaw	Samson, 15 June 1869; Chickasaw, 10 August 1869	1862	10 February 1864	14 May 1864
Kickapoo	G. B. Allen, St. Louis, Missouri	Kickapoo	Cyclops, 15 June 1869; Kewaydin, 10 August 1869	1862	12 March 1864	8 July 1864
Milwaukee	Union Iron Works, Carondelet, St. Louis	Milwaukee	NA	27 May 1862	8 February 1864	27 August 1864
Winnebago	Union Iron Works, Carondelet, St. Louis	Winnebago	Tornado, 15 June 1869; Winnebago, 10 August 1869	1862	4 July 1863	27 April 1864

== Careers ==
Chickasaw and Winnebago, the first two ships to be commissioned, spent some time patrolling the Mississippi River and supporting Union forces operating along its length before they were transferred to the West Gulf Blockading Squadron in early July 1864 to support the impending attack on the defenses of Mobile, Alabama Rear Admiral David Farragut organized the four monitors present into a separate column leading his wooden ships to engage Fort Morgan while the other ships proceeded into the Bay itself. Winnebago and Chickasaw were the third and fourth monitors in line, respectively, as the two more heavily armored Canonicus-class monitors, Tecumseh and Manhattan, preceded them. Tecumseh struck a torpedo in front of the fort and a small boat from the gunboat Metacomet rescued 10 survivors and delivered them to Winnebago. The latter's aft turret had jammed during her bombardment of Fort Morgan while Chickasaw's funnel had been riddled with holes, significantly reducing her speed.

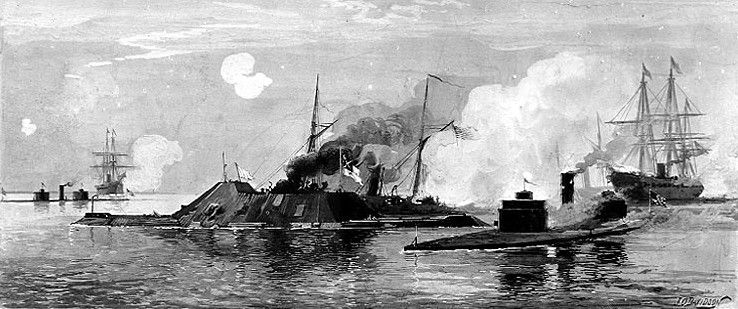
Drawing of the climax of the Battle of Mobile Bay when the ironclad CSS Tennessee surrendered. Chickasaw is in the right foreground and Winnebago in the left background

The Confederate ironclad Tennessee attacked Farragut's wooden ships without much effect after they had passed the Confederate forts, and she was engaged by Winnebago before she disengaged and briefly took shelter under Fort Morgan's guns. About a half-hour later, the ironclad attacked Farragut's ships again. The monitors were not initially engaged, but Chickasaw managed to assume a position by the Tennessee's stern and fired repeatedly at point-blank range. Her shots failed to penetrate the Tennessee's armor, but they did jam the armored shutter for the stern gun port and cut her exposed steering chains, rendering her unable to steer. When the crew attempted to unjam the shutter, one shell struck the edge of the shutter, creating fragments that killed the machinist attempting to knock out the shutter's retaining pin and broke Admiral Franklin Buchanan's leg. This damage, together with damage inflicted by the other Union ships, persuaded Commander James D. Johnston to surrender his ship. The two monitors remained in Mobile Bay and subsequently bombarded Fort Morgan and Fort Gaines until they surrendered less than three weeks later.

The other two monitors were commissioned too late to participate in the battle. After supporting forces near the mouth of the Red River during the summer, Kickapoo was transferred to the West Gulf Blockading Squadron in October for operations against Mobile itself; Milwaukee was also transferred to the West Gulf Blockading Squadron that same month.

Union forces were too weak to attack the city itself until March 1865. The monitors moved up the Blakeley River at the end of the month to cut off Confederate communications with Spanish Fort while Union troops besieged the fort. Milwaukee and Winnebago sortied upriver on 28 March to attack a Confederate transport and Milwaukee struck a torpedo while returning from the sortie. Her entire crew survived and was rescued by Kickapoo. The following day Kickapoo rescued the crew of the monitor Osage, which had also struck a torpedo and sunk. After the occupation of Selma, Alabama, in early April, Winnebago escorted a troop convoy to Selma and Montgomery, Alabama, and then blockaded the Tombigbee River to prevent the ironclad Nashville and other Confederate ships from interfering with Union forces.

After the war, the three surviving ships were decommissioned and later sold on 12 September 1874. Chickasaw's new owners converted her to sidewheel propulsion and she became a coal and railroad ferry until 1944, when she was converted to a barge, then sank in the 1950s near Audubon Park, New Orleans. Her wreck was discovered in 2004. Milwaukee's wreck was salvaged after the war, and some of her iron was used in building the Eads Bridge over the Mississippi at St. Louis.
