= USS Kickapoo (1864) =

Milwaukee-class river monitor

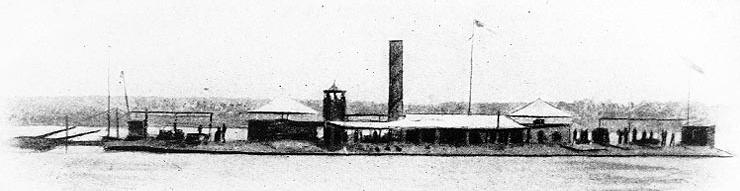
- Kickapoo with a mine rake attached to her bow

History

United States
- Name: Kickapoo
- Namesake: Kickapoo Indians
- Builder: G. B. Allen & Co., St. Louis, Missouri
- Laid down: 1862
- Launched: 12 March 1864
- Commissioned: 8 July 1864
- Decommissioned: 29 July 1865
- Renamed: Cyclops, 15 June 1869; Kewaydin, 10 August 1869
- Fate: Sold for scrap, 12 September 1874

General characteristics
- Type: Milwaukee-class monitor
- Displacement: 1,300 long tons (1,300 t)
- Tons burthen: 970 bm
- Length: 229 ft (69.8 m)
- Beam: 56 ft (17.1 m)
- Draft: 6 ft (1.8 m)
- Depth of hold: 8 ft 6 in (2.6 m)
- Installed power: 7 × Tubular boilers
- Propulsion: 4 × Shafts; 2 × Non-condensing steam engines
- Speed: 9 knots (17 km/h; 10 mph)
- Complement: 138
- Armament: 2 × twin 11-inch (279 mm) Smoothbore Dahlgren guns
- Armor: Gun turrets: 8 in (203 mm); Side: 3 in (76 mm); Deck: .75 in (19 mm); Conning tower: 3 in (76 mm)

USS Kickapoo was a double-turreted Milwaukee-class river monitor. It was the lead ship of her class, built for the Union Navy during the American Civil War. The ship supported Union forces during the Mobile Campaign as they attacked Confederate fortifications defending the city of Mobile, Alabama in early 1865. She was placed in reserve after the end of the war and sold in 1874.

== Description ==
Kickapoo was 229 feet (69.8 m) long overall and had a beam of 56 feet (17.1 m). The ship had a depth of hold of 8 feet 6 inches (2.6 m) and a draft of 6 feet (1.8 m). She had a tonnage of 970 tons burthen and displaced 1,300 long tons (1,300 t). Her crew numbered 138 officers and enlisted men.

The ship was powered by two 2-cylinder horizontal non-condensing steam engines, each driving two propellers, using steam generated by seven tubular boilers. The engines were designed to reach a top speed of 9 knots (17 km/h; 10 mph). Kickapoo carried 156 long tons (159 t) of coal.

The ship's main armament consisted of four smoothbore, muzzle-loading 11-inch Dahlgren guns mounted in two twin-gun turrets. Her forward turret was designed by James Eads and her rear turret by John Ericsson. Each gun weighed approximately 16,000 pounds (7,300 kg) and could fire a 136-pound (61.7 kg) shell up to a range of 3,650 yards (3,340 m) at an elevation of +15°.

The cylindrical turrets were protected by eight layers of wrought iron 1-inch (25 mm) plates. The sides of the hull consisted of three layers of one-inch plates, backed by 15 inches (380 mm) of pine. The deck was heavily cambered to allow headroom for the crew on such a shallow draft and it consisted of a single iron plate .75 inches (19 mm) thick. The pilothouse, positioned behind and above the fore turret, was protected by 3 inches (76 mm) of armor.

== Construction and service ==
James Eads was awarded the contracts for all four of the Milwaukee-class ships. He subcontracted Kickapoo to G. B. Allen & Co. of St. Louis, Missouri who laid down the ship in 1862. She was the first U.S. Navy ship to be named after the Indian tribe, and was launched on 12 March 1864. Kickapoo was brought to Mound City, Illinois, on the Ohio River, for fitting out and commissioned on 8 July 1864 with Lieutenant David C. Woods in command.

The ship was initially assigned to the Mississippi River Squadron and spent the summer off the mouth of the Red River. She was transferred to the West Gulf Blockading Squadron on 1 October. Although the victory at the Battle of Mobile Bay on 5 August had closed the port of Mobile to blockade runners, the city itself had not been taken. The Confederates fortified the approaches to the city and heavily mined the shallow waters surrounding it. Lieutenant Commander Meriweather P. Jones relieved Woods on 23 December.

On 28 March 1865, Kickapoo was at anchor in the Blakely River when her sister ship Milwaukee struck a mine in an area already swept some 200 yards (180 m) away. Milwaukee remained afloat forward long enough to allow her crew to escape without loss and they were rescued by Kickapoo. She rescued the crew of the river monitor Osage the following day after that ship also struck a mine and sank. In late June, the ship sailed to New Orleans to be placed in ordinary; she was decommissioned on 29 July. Kickapoo was renamed to Cyclops on 15 June 1869 and then Kewaydin on 10 August. The ship was sold on 12 September 1874.
