= USS Milwaukee (1864) =

Lead ship of Milwaukee-class

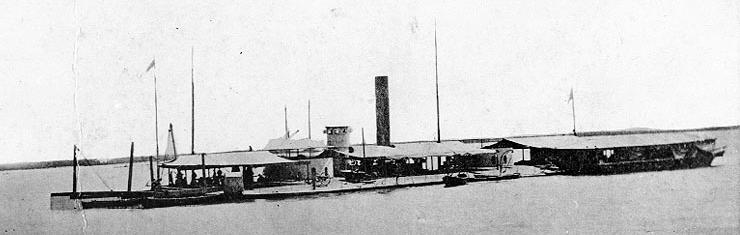
- Milwaukee with a mine rake attached to her bow

History

United States
- Name: USS Milwaukee
- Namesake: Milwaukee
- Laid down: 1864
- Launched: 4 February 1864
- Commissioned: 27 August 1864
- Fate: Sunk by a mine, 28 March 1865, raised and scrapped 1868

General characteristics
- Class & type: Milwaukee-class monitor
- Displacement: 1,300 long tons (1,300 t)
- Tons burthen: 970 bm
- Length: 229 ft (69.8 m)
- Beam: 56 ft (17.1 m)
- Draft: 6 ft (1.8 m)
- Depth of hold: 8 ft 6 in (2.6 m)
- Installed power: 7 × Tubular boilers
- Propulsion: 4 × Shafts; 2 × Non-condensing steam engines
- Speed: 9 knots (17 km/h; 10 mph)
- Complement: 138
- Armament: 2 × twin 11-inch (279 mm) Smoothbore Dahlgren guns
- Armor: Gun turrets: 8 in (203 mm); Side: 3 in (76 mm); Deck: .75–1.5 in (19–38 mm); Conning tower: 3 in (76 mm)

The first USS Milwaukee, a double-turreted Milwaukee-class river monitor, the lead ship of her class, built for the Union Navy during the American Civil War. The ship supported Union forces during the Mobile Campaign as they attacked Confederate fortifications defending the city of Mobile, Alabama in early 1865. She struck a mine in March and sank without loss. Her wreck was raised in 1868 and broken up for scrap that was used in the construction of a bridge in St. Louis, Missouri.

== Description ==
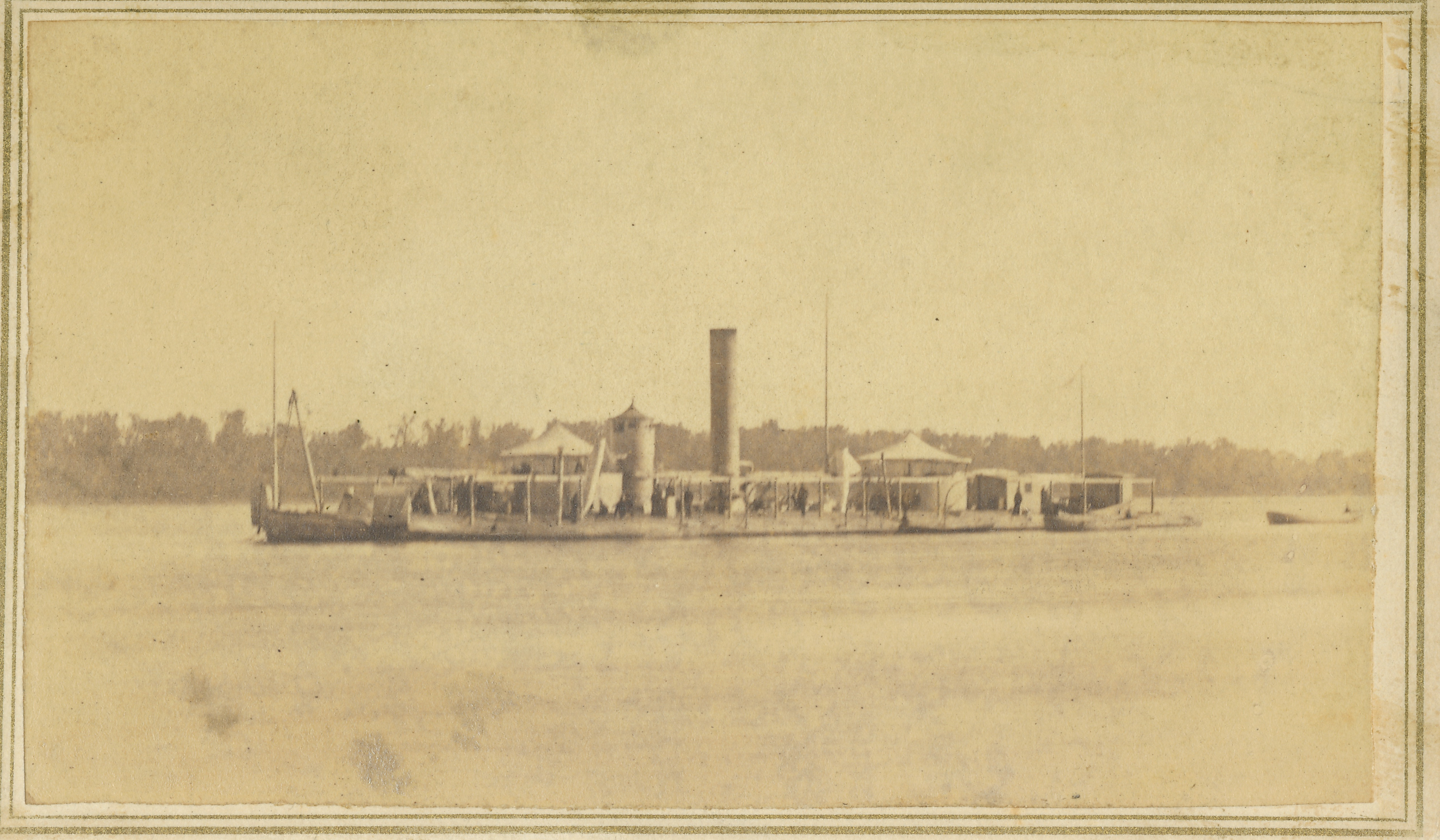
USS Milwaukee

Milwaukee was 229 feet (69.8 m) long overall and had a beam of 56 feet (17.1 m). The ship had a depth of hold of 8 feet 6 inches (2.6 m) and a draft of 6 feet (1.8 m). She had 970 tons burthen and displaced 1,300 long tons (1,300 t). Her crew numbered 138 officers and enlisted men.

The ship was powered by two 2-cylinder horizontal non-condensing steam engines, each driving two propellers, using steam generated by seven tubular boilers. The engines were designed to reach a top speed of 9 knots (17 km/h; 10 mph). Milwaukee carried 156 long tons (159 t) of coal.

The ship's main armament consisted of four smoothbore, muzzle-loading 11-inch Dahlgren guns mounted in two twin-gun turrets. Her forward turret was designed by James Eads and her rear turret by John Ericsson. Each gun weighed approximately 16,000 pounds (7,300 kg) and could fire a 136-pound (61.7 kg) shell up to a range of 3,650 yards (3,340 m) at an elevation of +15°.

The cylindrical turrets were protected by eight layers of wrought iron 1-inch (25 mm) plates. The sides of the hull consisted of three layers of one-inch plates, backed by 15 inches (380 mm) of pine. The deck was heavily cambered to allow headroom for the crew on such a shallow draft and it consisted of iron plates .75 inches (19 mm) thick. The pilothouse, positioned behind and above the fore turret, was protected by 3 inches (76 mm) of armor.

== Construction and service ==
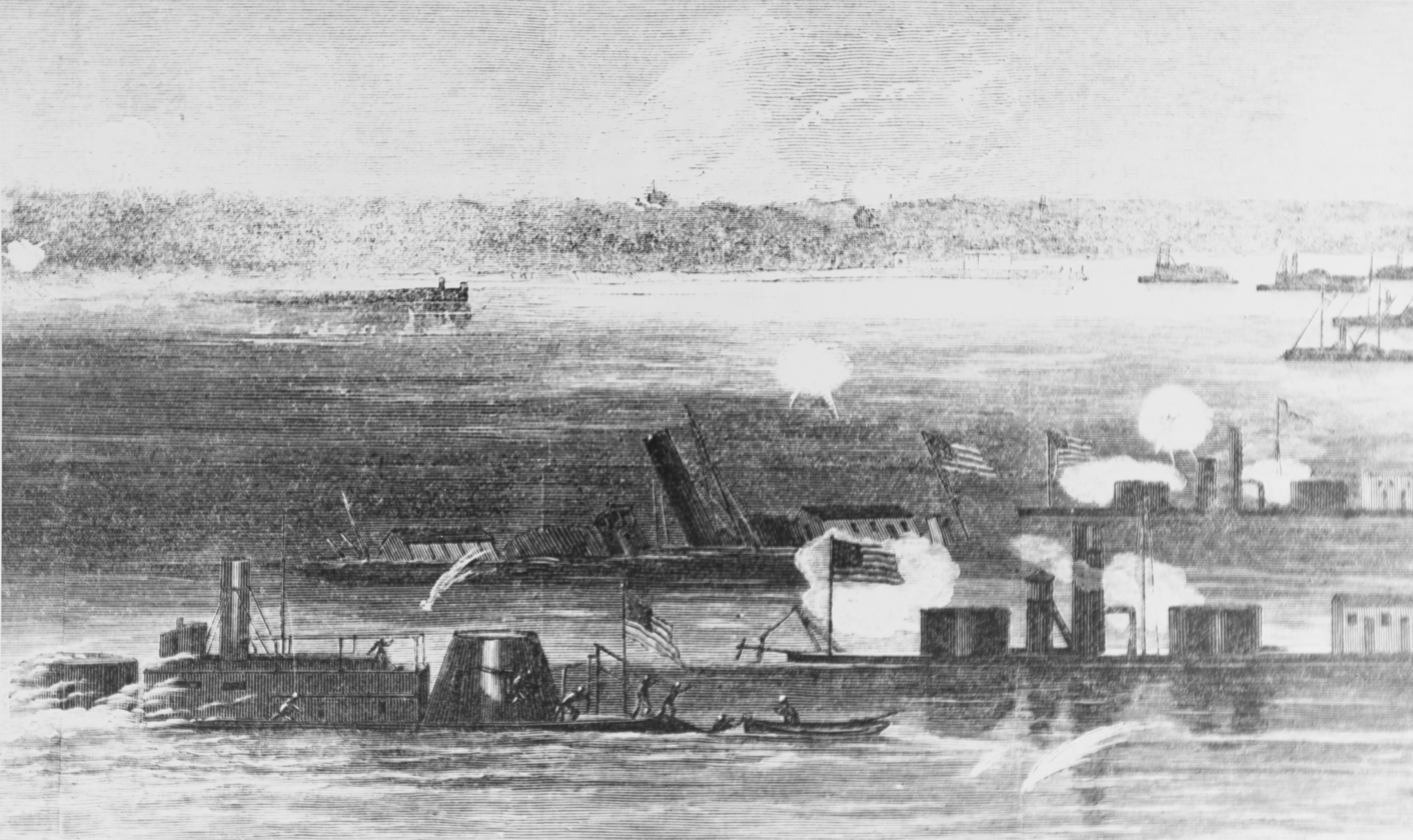
The siege of Mobile; wreck of the Osage; and the monitor Milwaukee

James Eads was awarded the contracts for all four of the Milwaukee-class ships. He laid down Milwaukee at his Union Iron Works Carondelet, St. Louis in 1862. The first U.S. Navy ship to be named after the Wisconsin city, she was launched on 4 February 1864 and commissioned on 27 August 1864. Acting Volunteer Lieutenant James W. Magune was in command.

Milwaukee was initially assigned to the Mississippi Squadron upon commissioning, but saw no action before she was ordered south to join West Gulf Blockading Squadron. The ship departed Mound City, Illinois on 15 October and arrived at New Orleans, Louisiana 12 days later. Lieutenant Commander James H. Gillis relieved Magune on 22 November. She was still under repair there on 27 November, although Milwaukee reached Mobile Bay by 1 January 1865.

Although the victory at the Battle of Mobile Bay on 5 August 1864 had closed the port of Mobile to blockade runners, the city itself had not been taken. The Confederates fortified the approaches to the city and heavily mined the shallow waters surrounding it. On 27 March 1865, Milwaukee, together with several other Union ships, sortied upriver in an attempt to cut communications between Spanish Fort and Mobile. The following day she and her sister ship Winnebago steamed up the Blakely River to attack a Confederate transport and forced it to retreat. While returning downriver Milwaukee struck a mine in an area previously swept. She remained afloat forward, which permitted her crew to escape without loss. Another of her sisters, Kickapoo, rescued the survivors.

In 1868 the wreck was raised and towed to St. Louis and broken up; her iron was used in the construction of the Eads Bridge across the Mississippi River.
