= USS Neosho (1863) =

Lead ship of Neosho-class

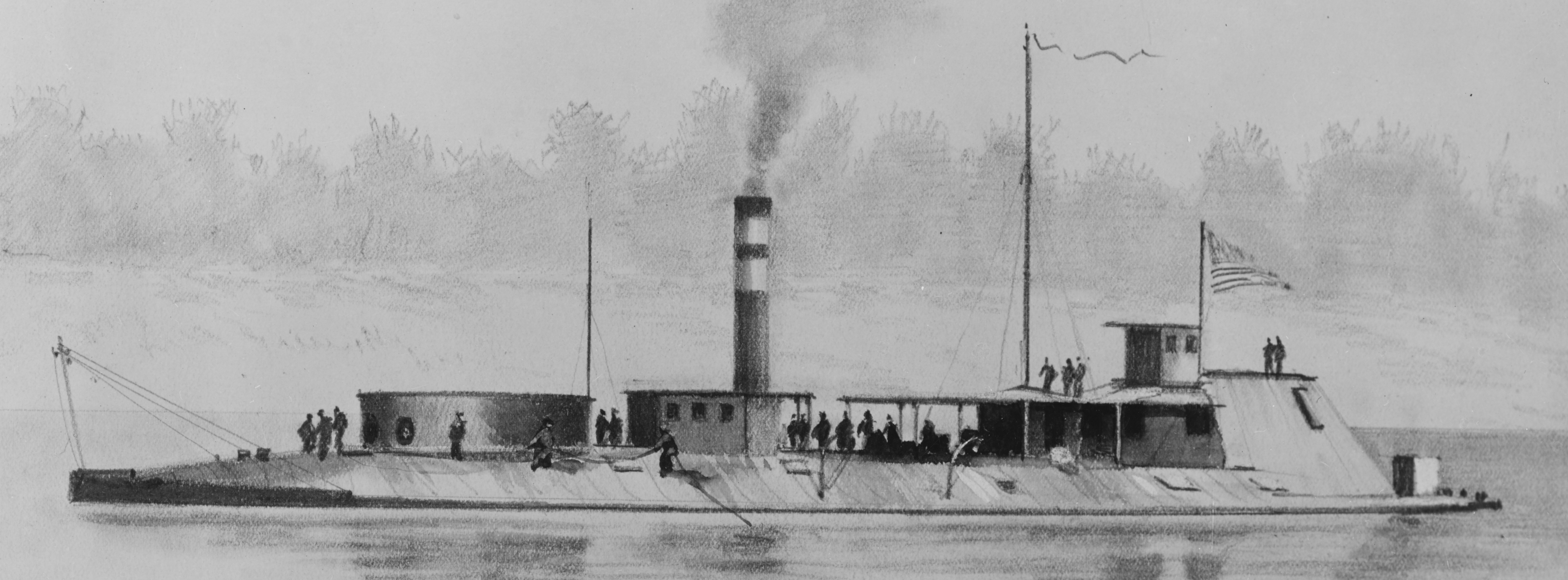
- USS Neosho (1863–1873) – Watercolor by Dr. Oscar Parkes

History

United States
- Name: USS Neosho
- Namesake: Neosho River
- Builder: Union Iron Works, Carondelet, Missouri
- Laid down: mid-1862
- Launched: 18 February 1863
- Completed: 1 July 1863
- Commissioned: 13 May 1863, Cairo, Illinois
- Decommissioned: 23 July 1865, Mound City, Illinois
- Renamed: Vixen, 15 June 1869; Osceola, 2 August 1869
- Stricken: 1873 (est.)
- Fate: Sold, 17 August 1873

General characteristics
- Class & type: Neosho-class river monitor
- Tons burthen: 523 (bm)
- Length: 180 ft (54.9 m)
- Beam: 45 ft (13.7 m)
- Draft: 4 ft 6 in (1.4 m)
- Depth of hold: 9 ft (2.7 m)
- Installed power: 400 ihp (300 kW); 4 × boilers
- Propulsion: 1 × stern wheel; 1 × Horizontal steam engine
- Speed: 12 miles per hour (10 kn)
- Complement: 100
- Armament: 2 × 11-inch (279 mm) smoothbore Dahlgren guns
- Armor: Gun turret: 6 in (152 mm); Hull: 2.5 in (64 mm); Deck: 1.25 in (32 mm)

USS Neosho, the lead ship of her class, was an ironclad river monitor laid down for the Union Navy in the summer of 1862 during the American Civil War. After completion in mid-1863, the ship spent time patrolling the Mississippi River against Confederate raids and ambushes as part of Rear Admiral David Porter's Mississippi Squadron. She participated in the Red River Campaign in March–May 1864. Neosho resumed her patrols on the Mississippi after the end of the campaign. She supported the Union Army's operations on the Cumberland River and provided fire support during the Battle of Nashville in December 1864. Neosho was decommissioned after the war and remained in reserve until sold in 1873.

== Design and description ==
The steam-powered gun turret of the Neosho was at the bow. She had a single deckhouse between the funnel and the sternwheel, although another was later added between the turret and the funnel. Her pilothouse was positioned above the rear deckhouse, next to the forward face of the sternwheel. The ship was 180 feet (54.9 m) long overall and had a beam of 45 feet (13.7 m). When launched she proved to have a draft 1 foot (0.3 m) deeper than planned and she measured 523 tons burden. Neosho had four steam boilers powering a two-cylinder, western steamboat-type engine that drove the sternwheel. The ship had a maximum speed of 12 miles per hour (19 km/h) in service and she carried 50 long tons (51 t) of coal. Her crew numbered 100 officers and enlisted men. After commissioning, the ship was modified with a small breakwater at her bow.

Neosho's main armament consisted of two smoothbore 11-inch (279 mm) Dahlgren guns mounted in a single turret that had an arc of fire of 300°. Firing the guns tended to jam the turret until modifications were made to the guns' recoil system. Each gun weighed approximately 16,000 pounds (7,300 kg). They could fire a 136-pound (61.7 kg) shell up to a range of 3,650 yards (3,340 m) at an elevation of 15°. The turret were protected by 6 inches (152 mm) of wrought iron while the hull had 2.5 inches (64 mm) of armor. The armor plates of the deck and paddle housing were 1.25 inches (32 mm) thick.

== Service ==
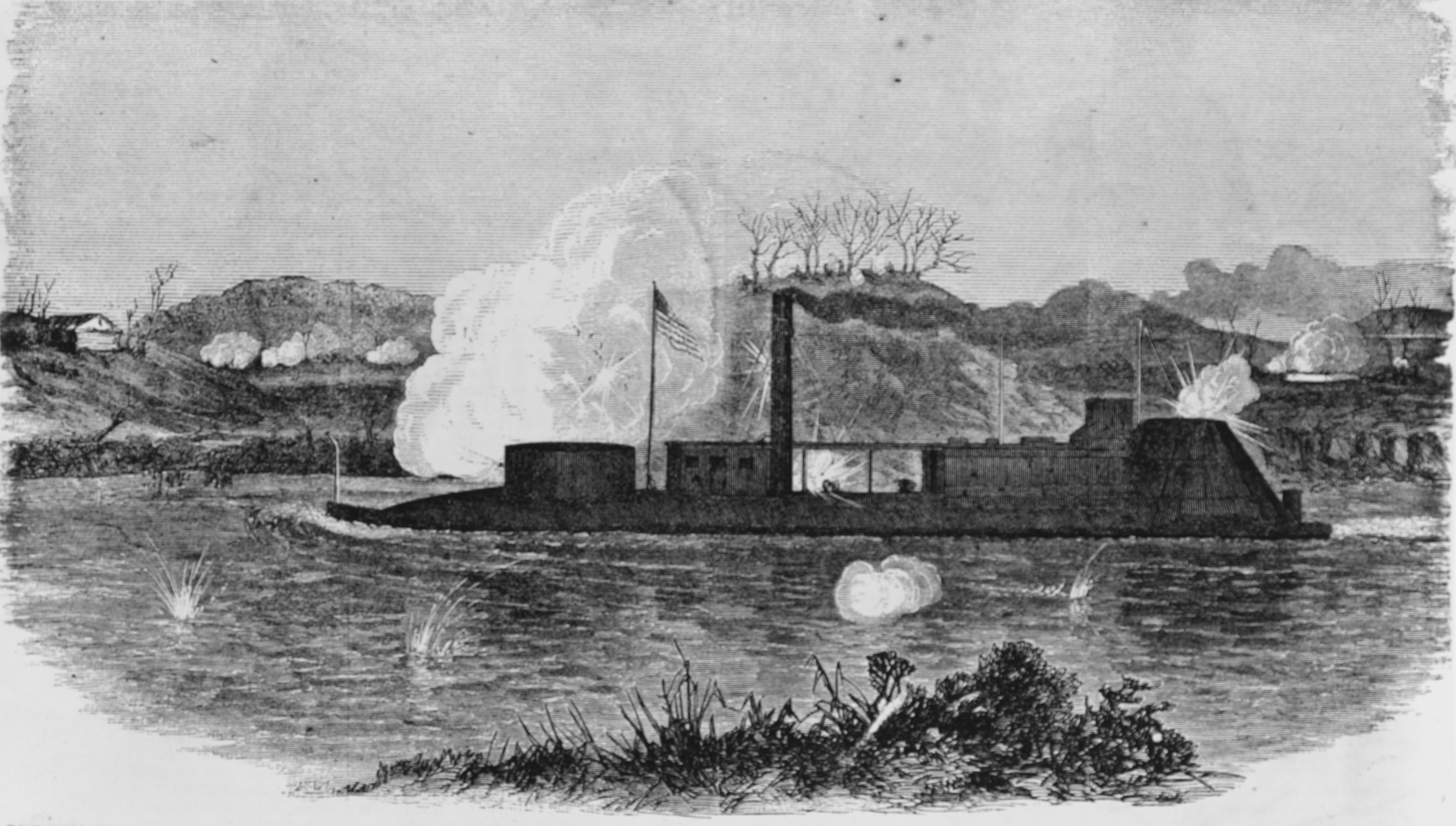
Neosho engaging Confederate artillery on the Cumberland River, 6 December 1864

Neosho, named after the Neosho River that flowed through Kansas and Oklahoma, and the first of her name, was laid down in mid-1862 by James Eads at his Union Iron Works in Carondelet, Missouri with construction overseen by Edward Hartt. She was launched on 18 February 1863 and commissioned at Cairo, Illinois on 13 May 1863, with Commander John C. Febiger in command, but was not completed until 1 July. She left Cairo on 14 July 1863 and reached Vicksburg on 6 August, just over a month after it had surrendered after a lengthy siege. Neosho and other warships patrolled the Mississippi and its tributaries to prevent Confederate raiders and flying batteries from ambushing Union supply ships. One example was on 8 December 1863 when "a Confederate shore battery attacked and disabled the merchant steamer Henry Von Phul; Neosho and Signal steamed up to defend the ship and silenced the battery."

From 12 March to 22 May 1864, Neosho participated in the unsuccessful Red River Campaign under the command of Rear Admiral David Porter. During the retreat down the Red River, Neosho was trapped above the falls at Alexandria, Louisiana, along with most of the other ironclads of the Mississippi Squadron, when the river's water level unexpectedly began to fall. Two temporary dams, known as Bailey's Dam, had to be built in April–May to raise the water level high enough to allow the ironclads to proceed downstream. During the Franklin-Nashville Campaign in December 1864 Neosho, accompanied by the casemate ironclad Carondelet, bombarded Confederate artillery batteries on the Cumberland River, near Bell's Mills, Tennessee, on 6 December. Despite being hit over 100 times, she was not seriously damaged. The monitor bombarded the Confederate right wing during the Battle of Nashville on 15–16 December.

Neosho was decommissioned at Mound City, Illinois on 23 July 1865 and placed in reserve. She was renamed Vixen on 15 June 1869 and renamed again Osceola on 2 August 1869. The ship was sold on 17 August 1873 for $13,600.

== See also ==
- Bibliography of early U.S. naval history
- USS Monitor
- Blockade runners of the American Civil War
- Bibliography of the American Civil War
