= Quinn Chapel AME Church (St. Louis, Missouri) =

Historic church in Missouri, United States

- U.S. National Register of Historic Places
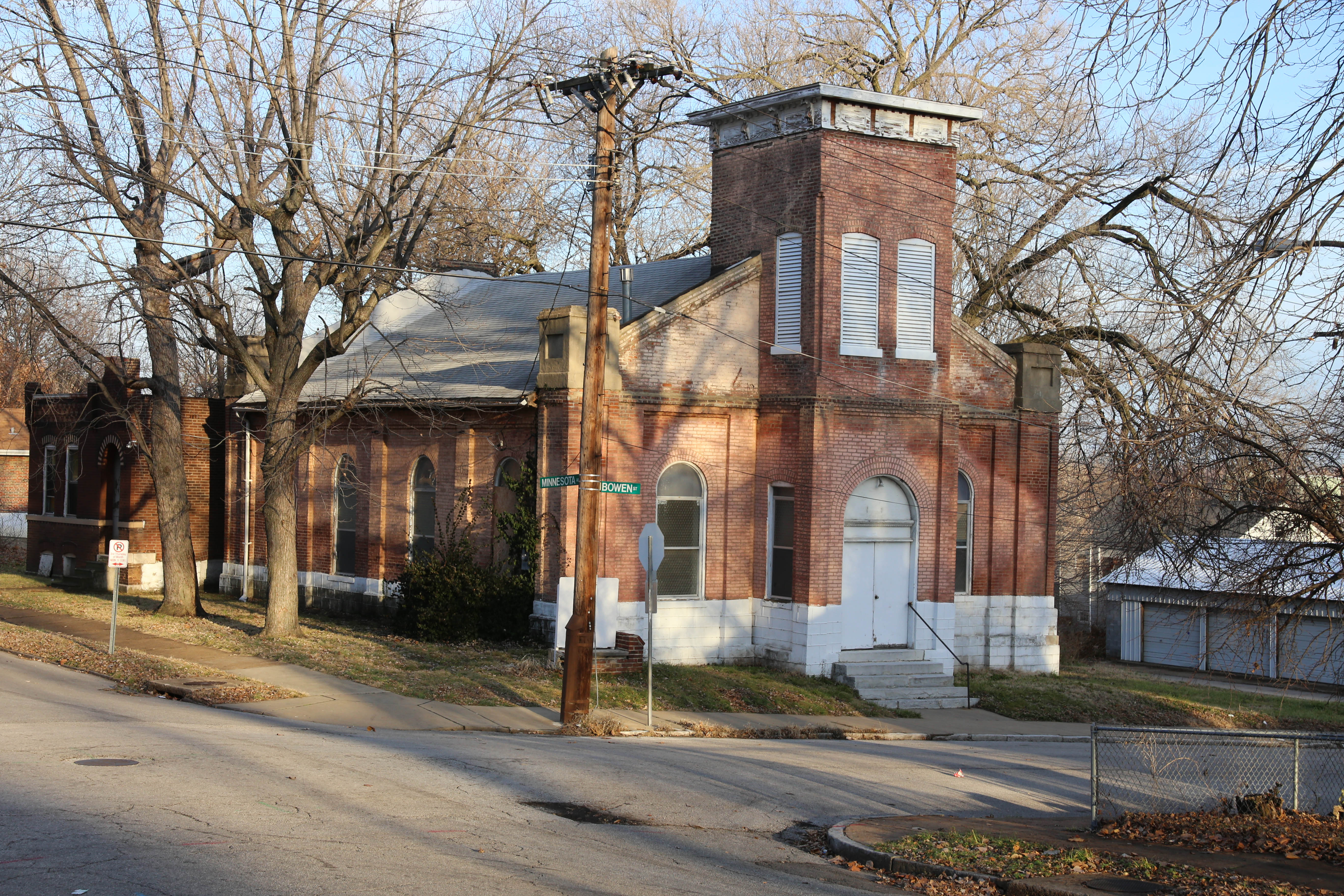

- Location within St. Louis Location within Missouri Location within the United States
- Location: 227 Bowen St., St. Louis, Missouri
- Coordinates: 38°33′32″N 90°14′51″W
- Area: less than one acre
- Built: 1869
- NRHP reference No.: 74002277
- Added to NRHP: October 16, 1974

Quinn Chapel AME Church is a historic African Methodist Episcopal Church building located at 227 Bowen Street in the Carondelet section of St. Louis, Missouri, in the United States. Built in 1869 as the North Public Market, it was acquired by the church in 1880. On October 16, 1974, it was added to the National Register of Historic Places. Its current pastor is Rev. Lori K. Beason.

== History ==
The Carondelet AME Church, which had been founded in 1845, bought the North Public Market in 1880 from the city of St. Louis and converted it for use as a church. The market, built in 1869 by the then city of Carondolet, had passed to the city of St. Louis in 1870 when it annexed Carondolet. In 1882 the church's name was changed to Quinn Chapel in memory of William Paul Quinn, the fourth bishop of the AME Church.

== Current use ==
One of Quinn Chapel AME's last pastors was the Rev. Lori K. Beason. Quinn Chapel became inactive in 2019. The building was destroyed by fire in February 2025.

== See also ==
- List of Registered Historic Places in St. Louis County, Missouri
