= Sheer (ship) =

Shipbuilding deck curvature measurement

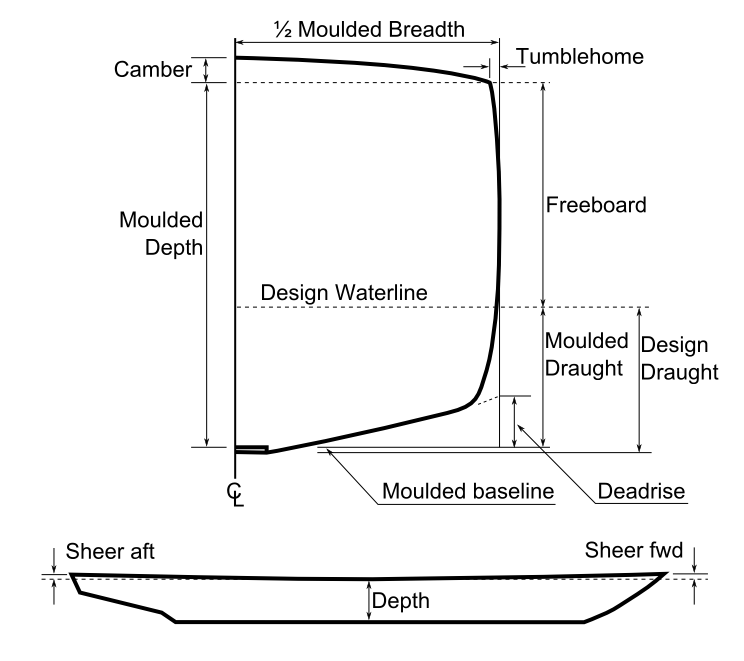
Dimensions of a hull

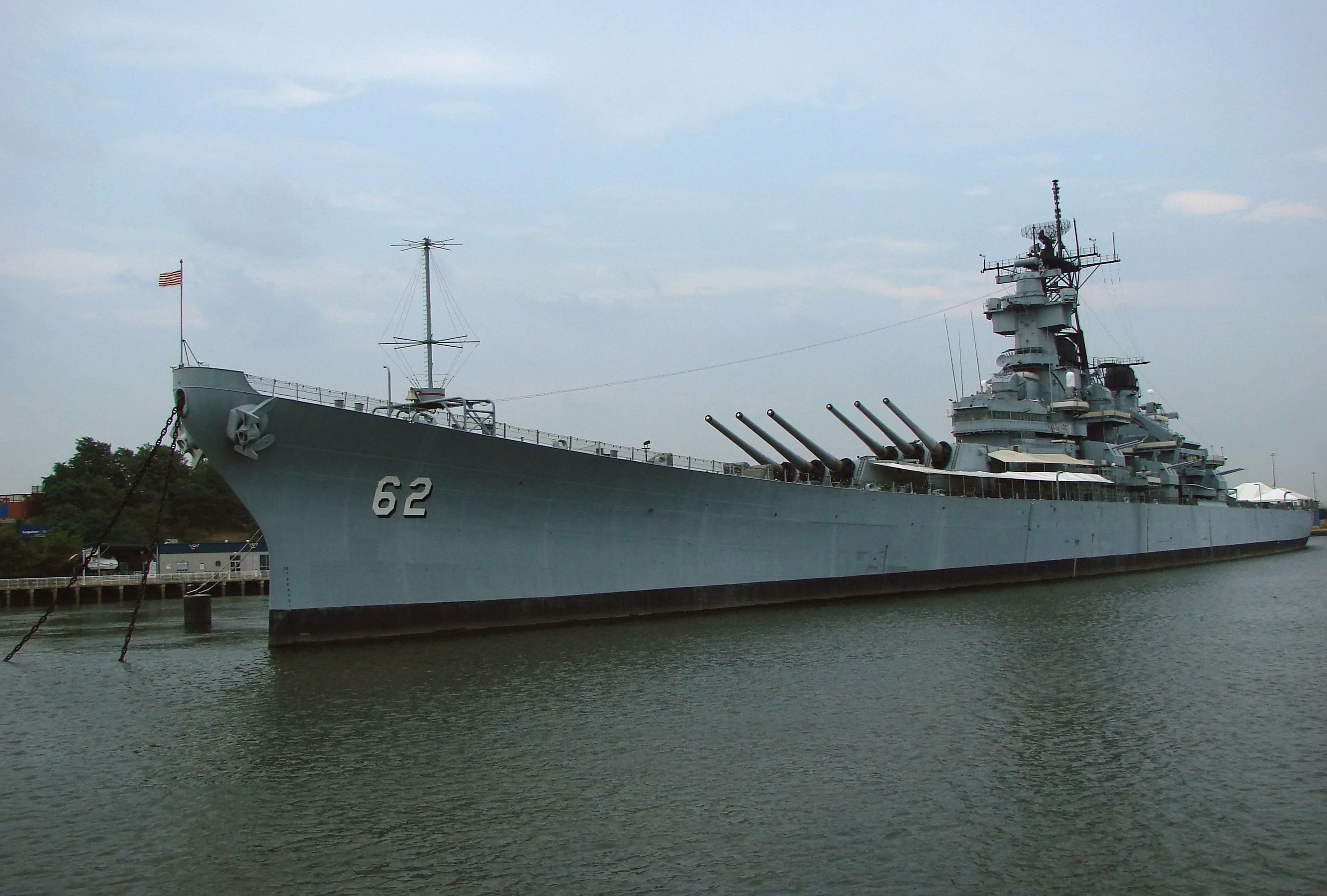
The prominent sheer in the bow of the battleship USS New Jersey

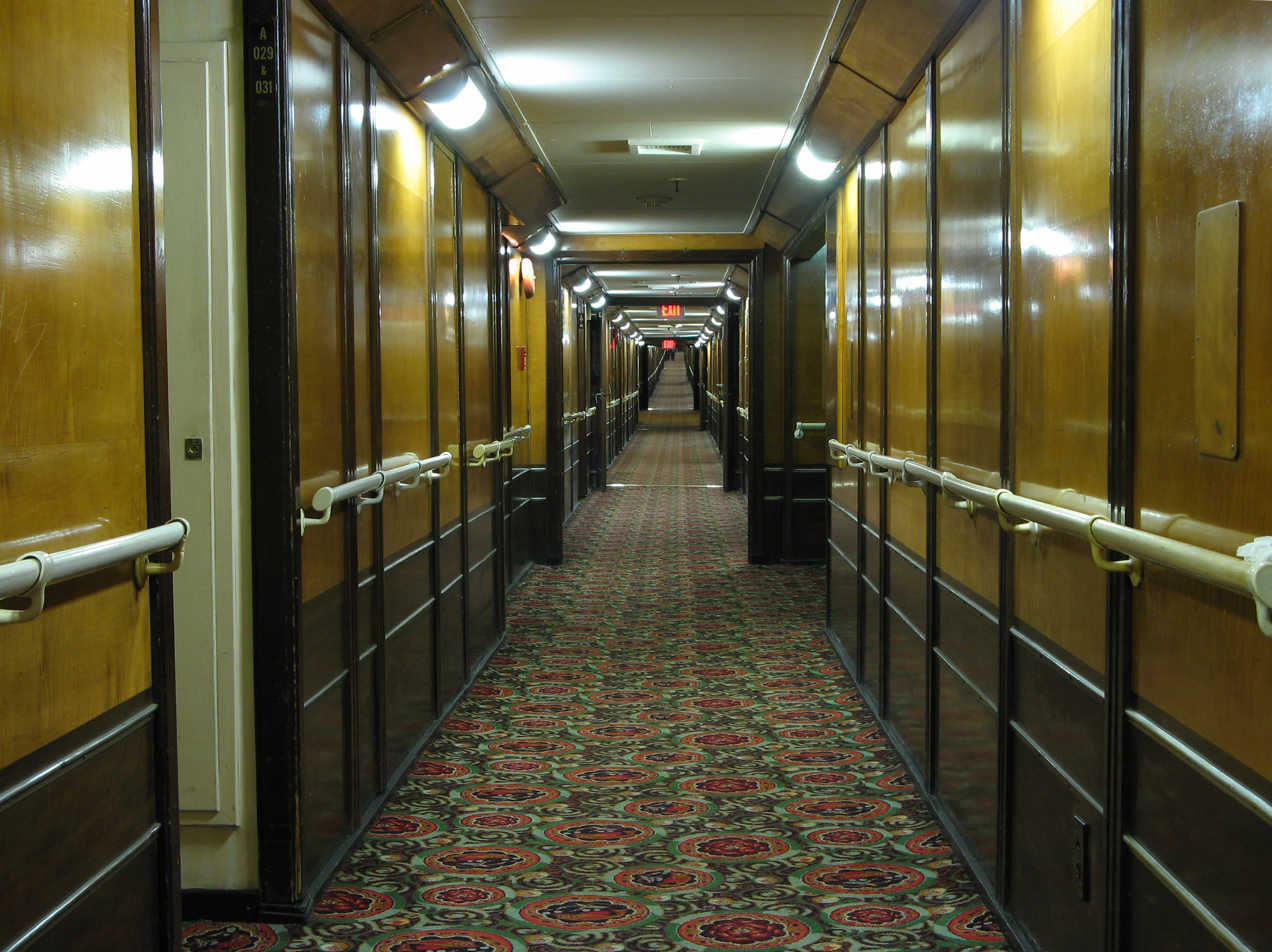
View of a corridor on the RMS Queen Mary, visibly showing the sheer. Notice the upward curve as the corridor goes on.

The sheer is a measure of longitudinal main deck curvature in naval architecture. The sheer forward is usually twice that aft. Increases in the rise of the sheer forward and aft build volume into the hull, and in turn increase its buoyancy forward and aft, thereby keeping the ends from diving into an oncoming wave and slowing the ship. In the early days of sail, one discussed a hull's sheer in terms of how much "hang" it had. William Sutherland's The Ship-builders Assistant (1711) covers this information in more detail.

The practice of building sheer into a ship dates back to the era of small sailing ships. These vessels were built with the decks curving upwards at the bow and stern in order to increase stability by preventing the ship from pitching up and down.

Sheer on exposed decks also makes a ship more seaworthy by raising the deck at fore and aft ends further from the water and by reducing the volume of water coming on deck.

== See also ==
- Camber (ship)
