= USS Osage (1863) =

Neosho-class monitor

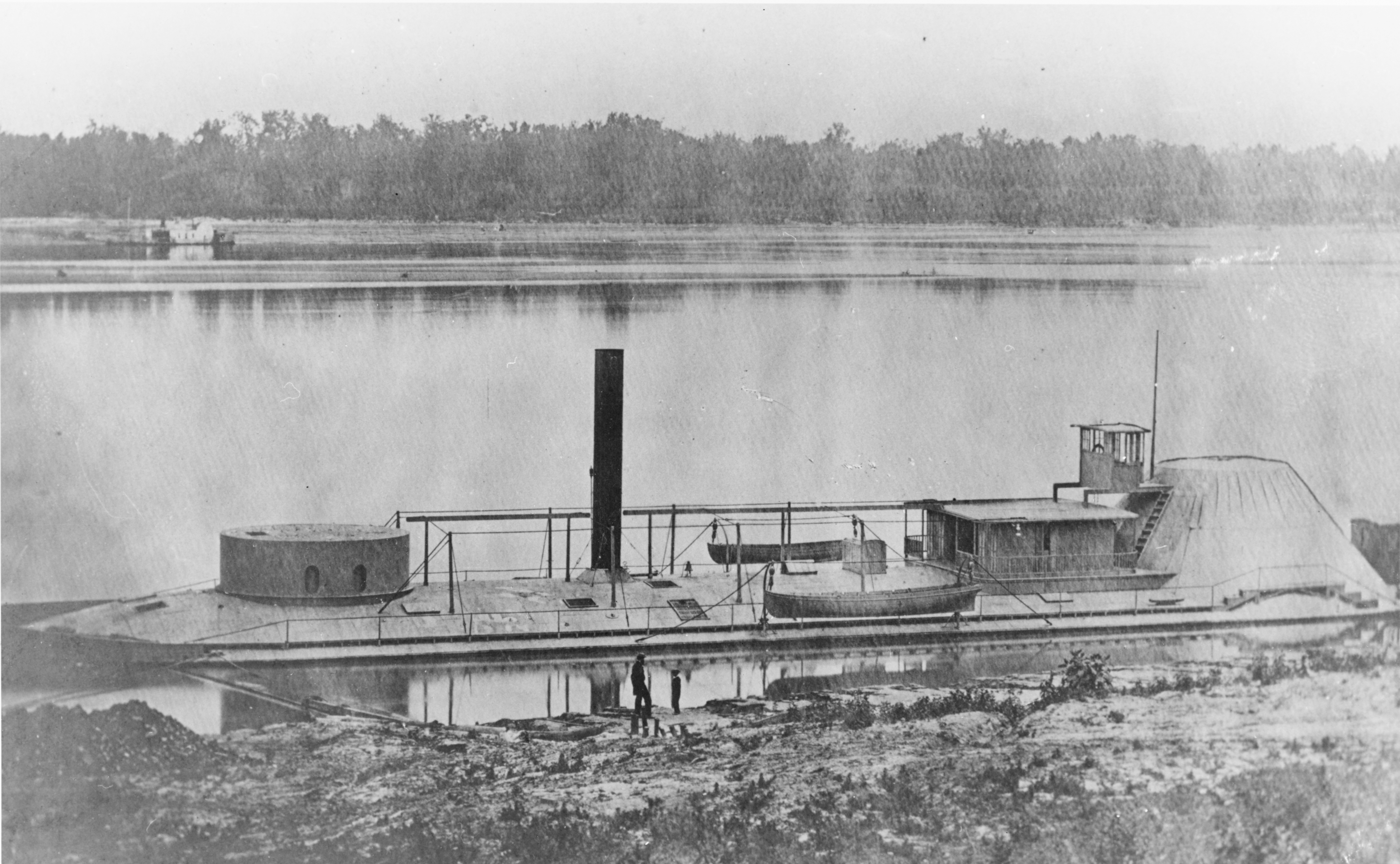
- Osage at anchor

History

United States
- Name: USS Osage
- Namesake: Osage Nation
- Builder: Union Iron Works, Carondelet, Missouri
- Laid down: 1862
- Launched: 13 January 1863
- Commissioned: 10 July 1863
- Fate: Sunk by mine, 29 March 1865; Raised and sold, 22 November 1867

General characteristics
- Type: Neosho-class river monitor
- Tons burthen: 523 (bm)
- Length: 180 ft (54.9 m)
- Beam: 45 ft (13.7 m)
- Draft: 4 ft 6 in (1.4 m)
- Depth of hold: 9 ft (2.7 m)
- Installed power: 400 ihp (300 kW); 4 × boilers
- Propulsion: 1 × Stern wheel; 1 × Horizontal steam engine
- Speed: 12 miles per hour (10 kn)
- Complement: 100
- Armament: 2 × 11-inch (279 mm) smoothbore Dahlgren guns
- Armor: Gun turret: 6 in (152 mm); Hull: 2.5 in (64 mm); Deck: 1.25 in (32 mm)

USS Osage was a single-turreted Neosho-class monitor built for the Union Navy during the American Civil War. After completion in mid-1863 by Edward Hartt, the ship patrolled the Mississippi River against Confederate raids and ambushes as part of Rear Admiral David Porter's Mississippi Squadron. Osage participated in the Red River Campaign in March–May 1864, during which she supported the capture of Fort DeRussy in March and participated in the Battle of Blair's Landing in April. The ship was grounded on a sandbar for six months after the end of the campaign and badly damaged. Osage, after being refloated and repaired, was transferred to the West Gulf Blockading Squadron in early 1865 for the campaign against Mobile, Alabama. During the Battle of Spanish Fort in March 1865 she struck a mine and rapidly sank. The ship was later salvaged and sold in 1867.

== Design and description ==
The steam-powered gun turret of the Osage was at the bow and she had a deckhouse between the funnel and the sternwheel, although another was later added between the turret and the funnel. Her pilothouse was positioned above the rear deckhouse, next to the forward face of the sternwheel. The ship was 180 feet (54.9 m) long overall and had a beam of 45 feet (13.7 m). When launched she proved to have a draft 1 foot (0.3 m) deeper than planned and she measured 523 tons burthen. Osage had four steam boilers powering a two-cylinder, western steamboat-type engine that drove the sternwheel. The ship had a maximum speed of 12 miles per hour (19 km/h) in service and she carried 50 long tons (51 t) of coal. Her crew numbered 100 officers and enlisted men.

Osage's main armament consisted of two smoothbore 11-inch (279 mm) Dahlgren guns mounted in a single turret that had an arc of fire of 300°. Firing the guns tended to jam the turret until modifications were made to the guns' recoil system. Each gun weighed approximately 16,000 pounds (7,300 kg). They could fire a 136-pound (61.7 kg) shell up to a range of 3,650 yards (3,340 m) at an elevation of 15°. The turret was protected by 6 inches (152 mm) of wrought iron while the hull had 2.5 inches (64 mm) of armor. The armor plates of the deck and paddle housing were 1.25 inches (32 mm) thick.

== Service ==
Osage, named after the American Indian tribe, was laid down in mid-1862 and launched 13 January 1863 by James Eads at his Union Iron Works, Carondelet, Missouri. She was commissioned at Cairo, Illinois on 10 July 1863, with Acting Volunteer Lieutenant Joseph Pitty Couthouy in command.

After completion, the ship was assigned to Rear Admiral David Porter's Mississippi Squadron and patrolled the Mississippi River against Confederate raids and ambushes. During the Red River Campaign Osage was commanded by Lieutenant Commander Thomas O. Selfridge Jr. She supported the Union Army when it captured Fort DeRussy and captured Alexandria, Louisiana by herself on 15 March 1864 without firing a shot. She successfully defended the navy transports attacked during the Battle of Blair's Landing on 12 April, driving off the Confederate forces with heavy losses after having run aground and freed herself. After the end of the campaign in May she was assigned to patrol the Mississippi River. During that month she grounded on a sandbar near Helena, Arkansas and could not be refloated due to the rapidly falling water level even when some of her armor was removed. As the water receded Osage began to hog at the ends because only her middle was supported by the sand. This caused her longitudinal bulkheads to split and broke many rivets in her hull and on her deck. She was repaired in place before being refloated at the end of November.

After being towed to Mound City for more permanent repairs, Osage was transferred to the West Gulf Blockading Squadron on 1 February 1865 for the attack on Mobile, Alabama. She participated in the Battle of Spanish Fort, defending Mobile from the east, but struck a mine in a previously swept channel and sank rapidly on 29 March. Two crewmen were killed and some others wounded. The ship was later refloated and sold at auction at New Orleans on 22 November 1867, along with three ex-Confederate ships, for $20,467.
