= Camber (ship) =

Measure of lateral main deck curvature

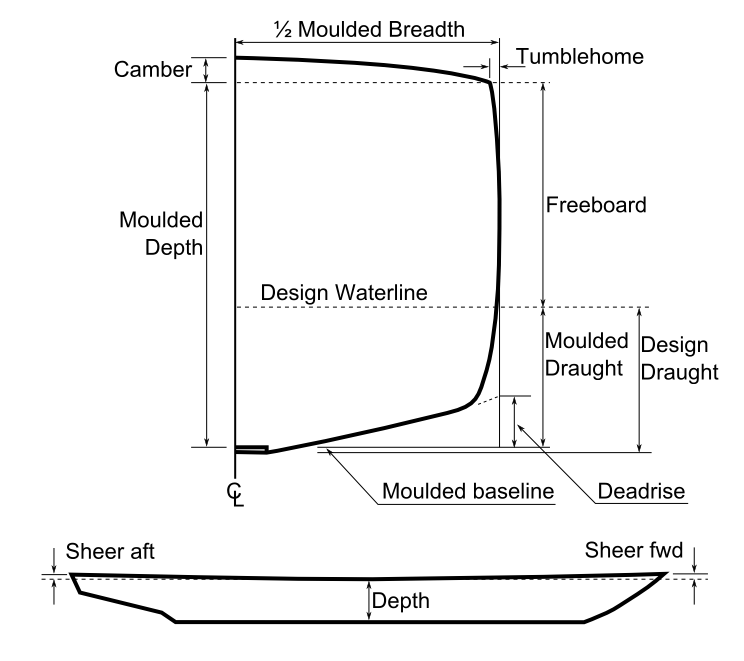
Dimensions of a hull

The camber is a measure of lateral main deck curvature in naval architecture. The curve is applied to a deck transversely, measured as the height of deck at centreline above the height of deck at side.

The practice of adding camber to a ship's deck originated in the era of small sailing ships. These vessels were built with the decks curving downwards at the sides in order to allow water that washed onto the deck to spill off. Camber also adds to a ship's longitudinal strength.

== See also ==
- Sheer (ship)
