= Carondelet, St. Louis =

Neighborhood of St. Louis in Missouri, US

Coordinates: 38.5596°N 90.2510°W

Carondelet
- Neighborhood of St. Louis
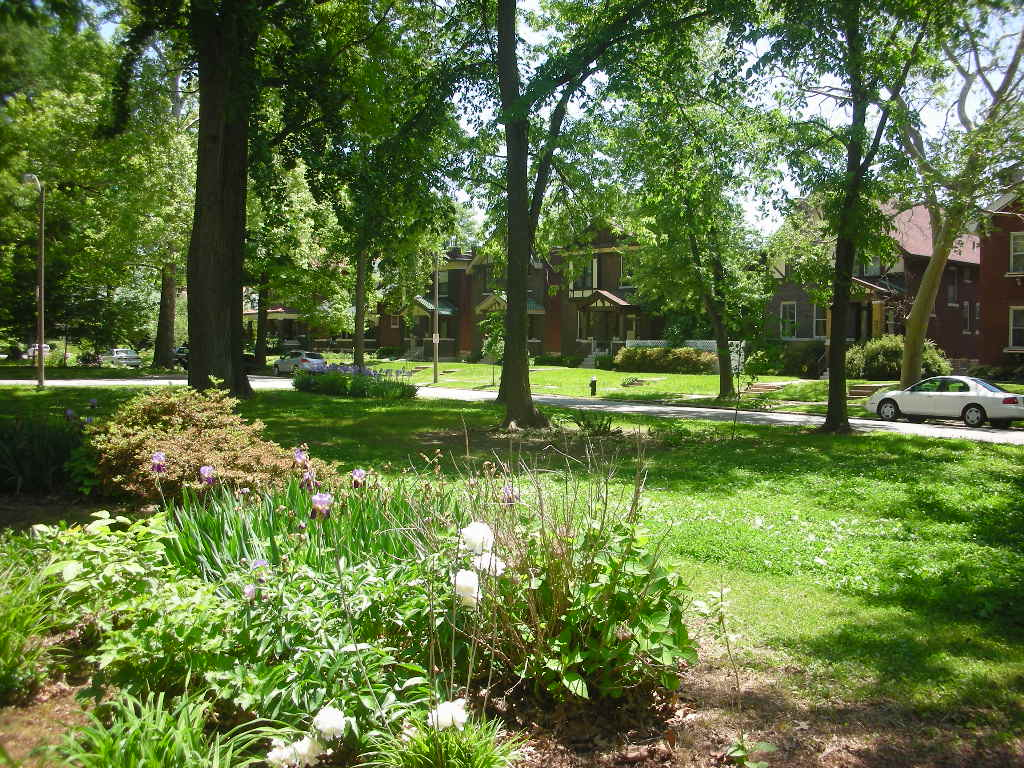
- Private residences along a traffic island in Carondelet.

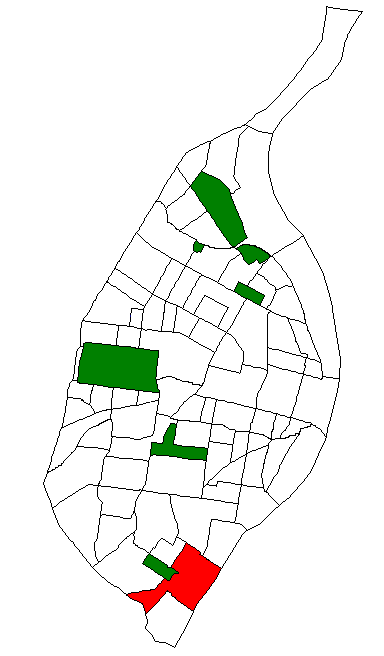
- Location (red) of Carondelet within St. Louis
- Country: United States
- State: Missouri
- City: St. Louis
- Wards: 1, 3, 8

Government
  - Alderpersons: Anne Schweitzer, Shane Cohn, Jami Cox Antwi

Area
  - Total: 1.45 sq mi (3.8 km^{2})

Population (2020)
  - Total: 7,734
  - Density: 5,330/sq mi (2,060/km^{2})
- ZIP code(s): Parts of 63111
- Area code(s): 314
- Website: stlouis-mo.gov

Carondelet (/kəˈrɒndəlɛt/ kə-RON-dəl-et) is a neighborhood in the extreme southeastern part of St. Louis, Missouri. It was incorporated as an independent city in 1851 and was annexed by the City of St. Louis in 1870. The neighborhood had a population of 7,734 people as of the 2020 Census.

== Name ==
Carondelet was named after Baron Carondelet, the governor of the Spanish colony Upper Louisiana. The community also held a number of names and nicknames during the centuries, including: Delor's Village, Catalan's Prairie, Louisbourg, Vide Poche, and Sugarloaf.

== History ==
Carondelet was founded in 1767 by Clément Delor de Treget who was born in Cahors, Quercy in southern France. He obtained a grant from St. Louis Commandant Louis Saint Ange, and built a stone house. The village was first known as Delor's Village. It was known later as Catalan's Prairie, named for Louis Catalan, an early settler. The next name for the village was Louisbourg, most likely in honor of Louis XVI, the king of France (1774–1793). It is said that shortly after the territory passed from French to Spanish hands, Treget wished to have his commission as captain of the militia renewed. Treget feared that his commission was going to be refused, since he was French. The governor-general of Louisiana, Baron de Carondelet, was in Spanish service. Treget flattered Carondelet by naming the village for him, and Treget received his commission.

The village was given the nickname Vide Poche in the early days. This name is often mistakenly translated as "empty pocket", which really is "Poche Vide" in French. This is a folk etymology that rests on a history of poverty among its inhabitants. The story is: the Carondelet citizens used to have to buy flour from St. Louis, and often they could not pay for it, because their pockets were empty. Another explanation translates the nickname to mean "Empties Pocket," which makes sense in French, thus conveying the idea that it was a place where the pockets of those visiting were going to be emptied. The inhabitants of Carondelet were noted for their hospitality and fondness for all kinds of sports and amusements. The St. Louis visitor would return home with emptied pockets - it is possible that the Carondelet men may have had fleeter horses or they may have been more skillful card players. When a St. Louisan was asked to visit Carondelet on Sunday afternoon, he would reply, "A quoi sert, c'est un vide poche." (meaning: "Of what use ? It is a place that empties pocket). Another nickname applied to Carondelet was "Pain de Sucre" or the "Sugarloaf."

An in-depth study of several instances of Vide Poche in North America shed light on the complex history of this place name. It turns out that this name migrated to Missouri from the Saint Lawrence Valley and initially meant "the mill", for "Vide-Poche" was documented to be a nickname in New France for the mill and the original population in the area mainly was from Canada. This St. Louis Vide Poche is indeed known to have harbored a mill in its very beginning. It seems however that another identical compound meaning "pickpocket" added to the semantic load of this place name.

Carondelet was described in a 1799 census as: "two leagues below St. Louis", and having a population of 181 white residents and 3 African slaves.

Carondelet was incorporated in 1832. It merged with the first ward of St. Louis under the name of South St. Louis in 1860, and it was annexed to St. Louis in 1870.

Carondelet is the first foundation of the Sisters of St. Joseph of Carondelet, a Congregation, with French roots, who arrived in America in 1836.

The community is particularly associated with processing lead from the Southeast Missouri Lead District. The affiliation began in the 1840s with the production of lead shot shipped in via the St. Louis, Iron Mountain and Southern Railway.

Susan Blow founded the first continuous, publicly funded kindergarten in the United States, at Carondolet's Des Peres School in 1873.

During the American Civil War, 32 ironclad gunboats for the Union Army and Navy were produced at the James Buchanan Eads-owned Union Marine Works shipyards, including four of the initial City class ironclads: St. Louis, Carondelet, Pittsburgh, and Louisville. The three other City class gunboats (Cairo, Mound City, and Cincinnati) were subcontracted out by Eads and built in Mound City, Illinois.

Hertz Metal Company produced baling wire and also operated a lead smelter, from 1870 until 1930. In 1876 Provident Chemical Works became a world leader in the production of phosphates from its Carondelet Plant in a process that initially involved lead. The plant was purchased by Swann Chemical Company in the 1920s, and then in 1935 by Monsanto. The River des Peres was rerouted through the plant in the 1930s as part of a Works Progress Administration project. Monsanto spun off the production to Solutia. It became part of Astaris and then Israel Chemical Limited in 2000. The plant produces 250 million pounds per year of phosphate and phosphoric acid products.

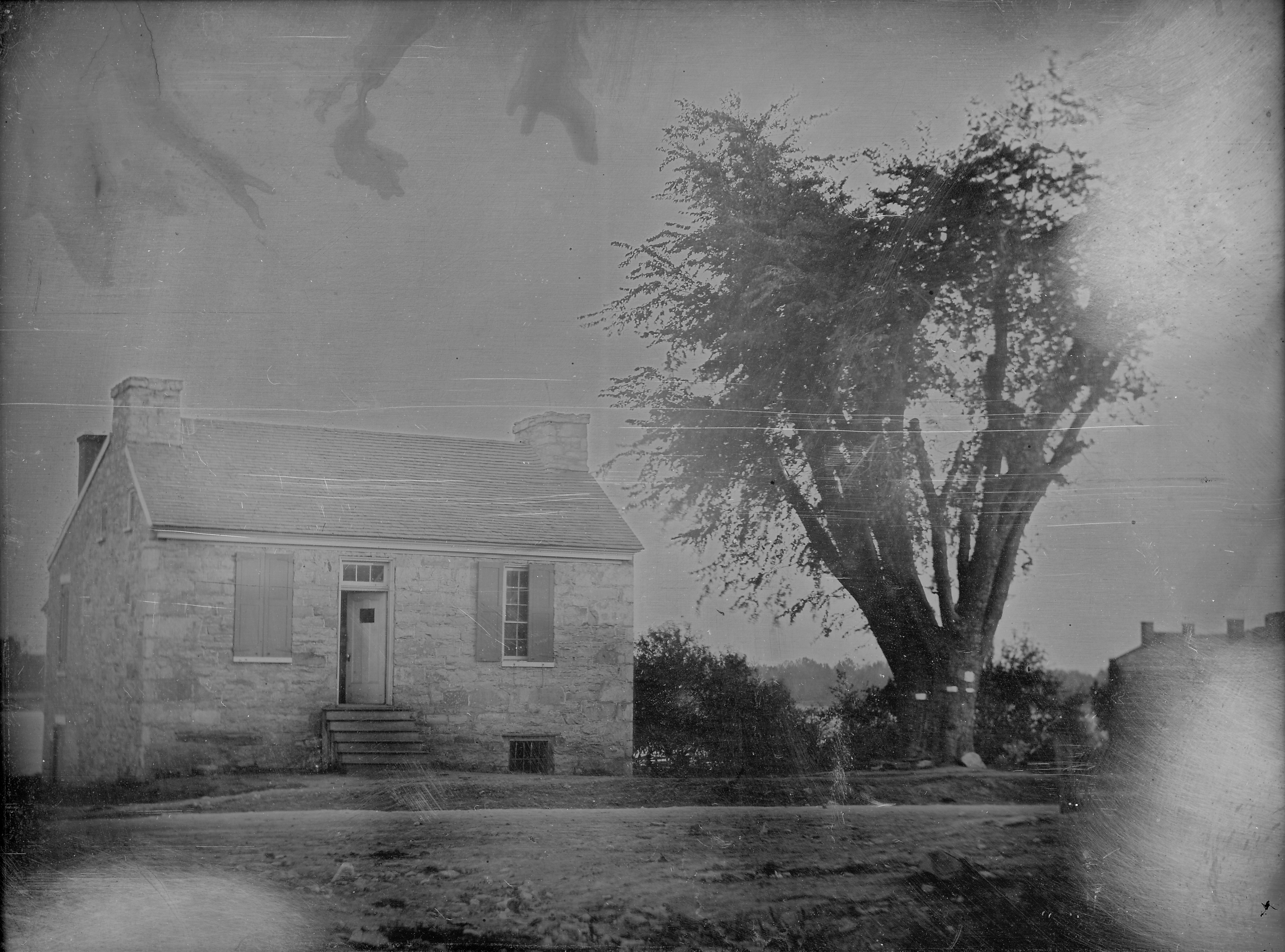
Carondelet Court House, 1860

The neighborhood originally was populated predominantly by French, and then later German immigrants. The neighborhood today contains a mixture of industrial uses along the Mississippi River, and residential and commercial uses away from the river. The neighborhood contains some of the oldest homes in St. Louis, because it once existed as an independent village. Most of the housing was constructed between 1880 and 1930. Housing in the area ranges from modest single-story cottages to apartment buildings, to larger single-family homes. Most of the housing is of brick construction.

== Demographics ==
In 2020 Carondelet's population was 43.1% White, 39.3% Black, 0.5% Native American, 1.5% Asian, 9.9% Two or More Races, and 5.6% Some Other Race. 9.6% of the population was of Hispanic or Latino origin.

Historical population
Census	Pop.	Note	%±
1990	9,417		—
2000	8,930		−5.2%
2010	8,661		−3.0%
2020	7,734		−10.7%

== See also ==
- Carondelet Park
- Sugarloaf Mound
- Holly Hills, St. Louis
- Susan Blow
- Henry Taylor Blow
- Quinn Chapel
- Dred Scott
- Neighborhoods of St. Louis
- USS Carondelet, a Civil War gunboat named after the town
