= James Buchanan Eads =

American civil engineer and inventor

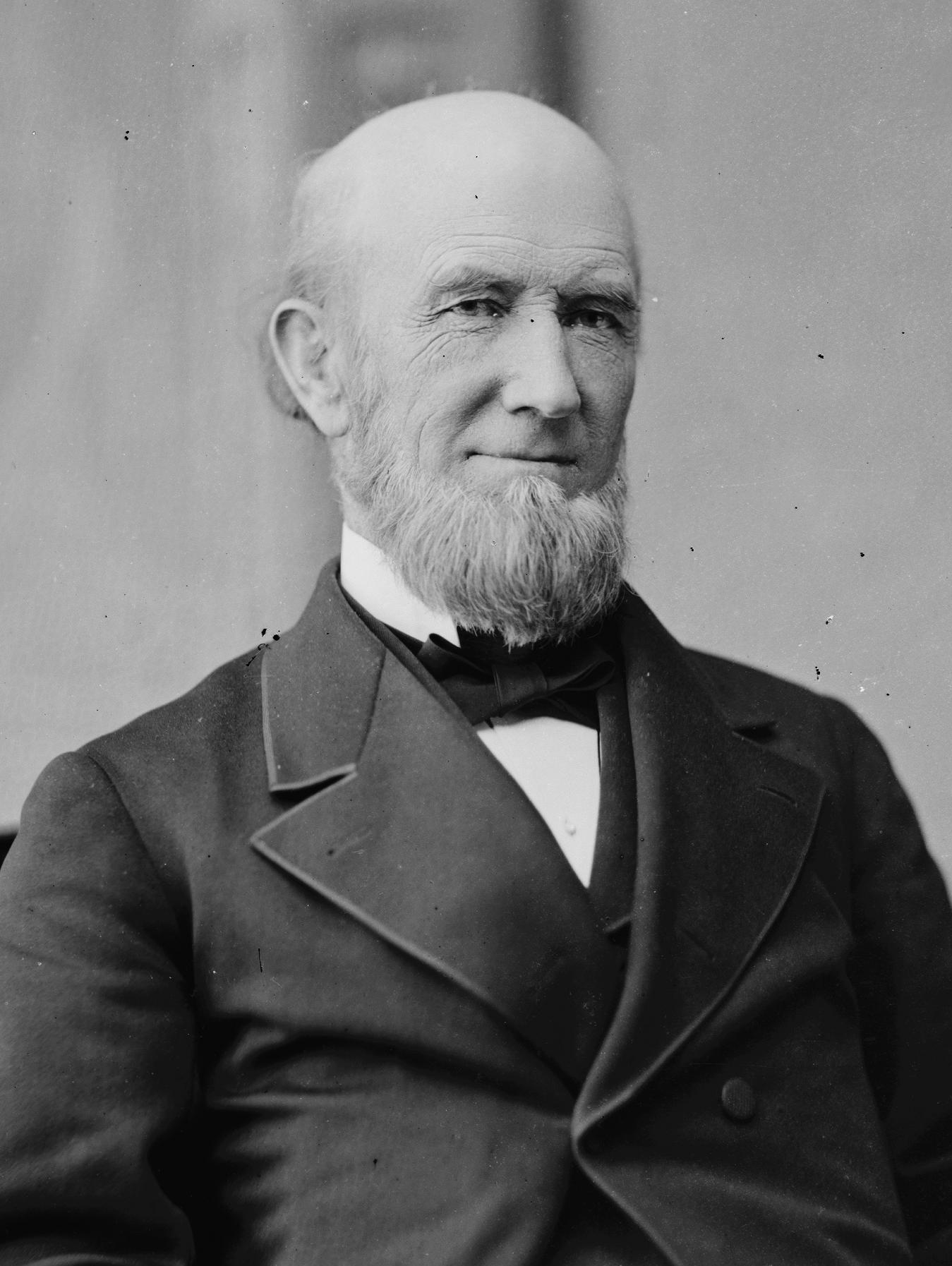
- Eads c. 1865–1880
- Born: May 23, 1820; Lawrenceburg, Indiana, US
- Died: March 8, 1887 (aged 66); Nassau, Bahamas
- Resting place: Bellefontaine Cemetery, St Louis, Missouri; U.S.
- Occupation: Civil engineer
- Spouses: Martha Nash Dillon (m. 1845; died 1852) Eunice Hagerman Eads (m. 1854)
- Children: One son, three step-daughters
- Awards: Albert Medal (1884)

James Buchanan Eads (May 23, 1820 – March 8, 1887) was an American civil engineer and inventor. He held more than 50 patents and was known internationally. He designed and built the Eads Bridge over the Mississippi River in St. Louis, which was designated a National Historic Landmark.

== Early life and education ==
Eads was born in Lawrenceburg, Indiana, and named for his mother's cousin, future President of the United States James Buchanan. Eads' father, Thomas C. Eads, pursued a fortune to no avail and the family moved several times. Eads grew up in St. Louis, Missouri. The family lost all of their possessions in a steamboat fire as they landed in St. Louis in 1833. Thomas Eads' business ventures in St. Louis failed, and he abandoned his family and moved upriver.

James Eads was largely self-educated; at the age of 13, he left school to take up work to help support the family. He sold apples on the streets of St. Louis to help support his sisters and mother, who ran a boardinghouse. One of his first jobs was at the Williams & Duhring dry-goods store run by Barrett Williams. Williams allowed the young Eads to spend time in his library, located above the store. In Eads's spare time, he read books on physical science, mechanics, machinery, and civil engineering. When Eads became successful later in life and Williams suffered hardship, Eads reciprocated Williams' generosity by providing money for Williams' comfort in his old age.

== Family ==
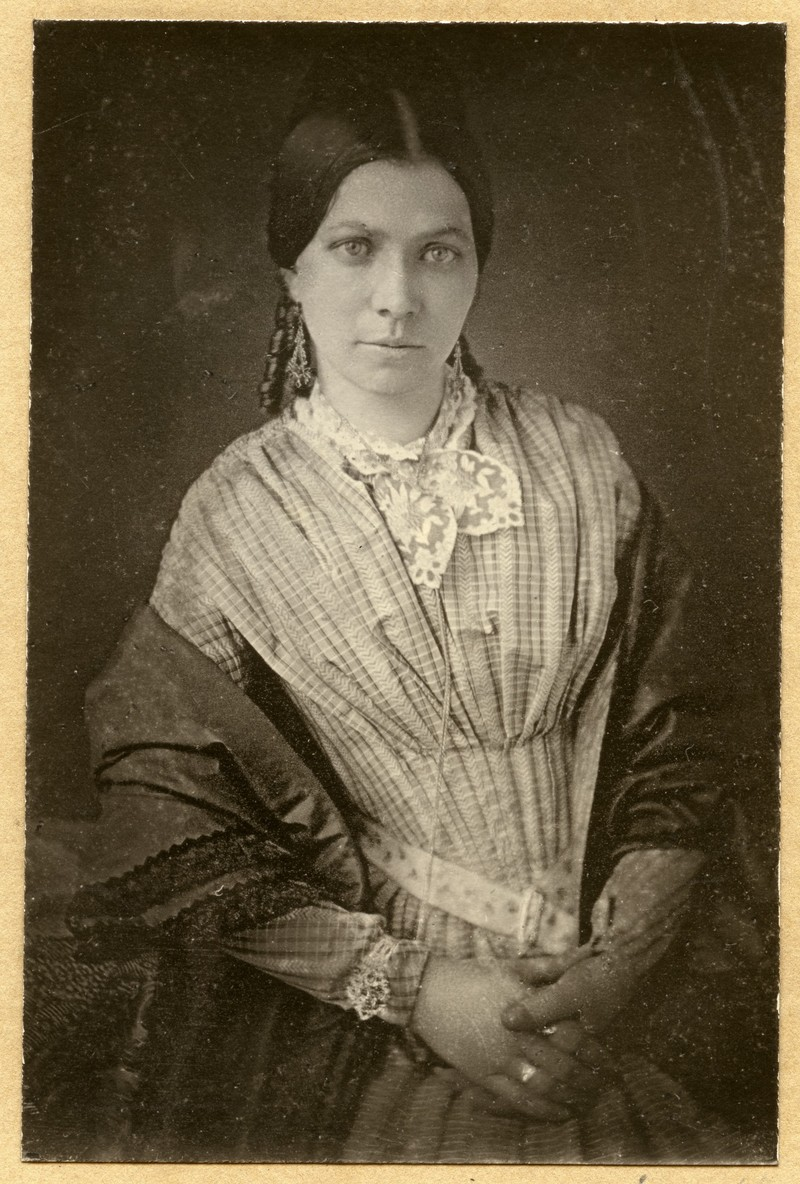
Photograph portrait of Martha Dillon Eads, wife of James B. Eads

Around 1842, Eads fell in love with Martha Dillon, a woman related to him by marriage. Martha's father was Patrick Dillon, a prominent St. Louis businessman. Patrick did not approve of the couple, as he wanted Martha to marry someone with money and influence. In October 1845, James and Martha wed without her father's consent.

Martha moved in with Eads' parents in LeClaire, Iowa while Eads stayed behind in St. Louis to set up a glass works. Although their living arrangement was supposed to be temporary, the failure of his glass business made it permanent. Eads had many debts to pay off from the failed business and he went back to working in salvage.

Martha died in October 1852 of cholera. She did not live to see Eads become successful. Five years after her death, when Eads retired from working on the river, he had amassed a fortune of $500,000.

Nine years after Martha's death, in 1861, Eads remarried.

== Fortune ==
When he was twenty-two, Eads designed a salvage boat and showed the drawings to two shipbuilders, Calvin Case and William Nelson. Although Eads had no previous experience and no capital for the project, Case and Nelson were impressed with him and the three became partners.

At that time, salvaging wrecks from the Mississippi River was nearly impossible because of strong currents. Eads made his initial fortune in salvage by creating a diving bell, using a 40 US gal (33 imp gal; 150 L) wine barrel to retrieve goods sunk in riverboat disasters. He also devised special boats for raising the remains of sunken ships from the river bed. Eads did much of the diving himself because the work was so dangerous. His work gave Eads an intimate knowledge of the river, as he explored its depths from the Gulf of Mexico to Iowa. Because of his detailed knowledge of the Mississippi (the equal of any professional river pilot), his exceptional ability at navigating the most treacherous parts of the river system, and his personal fleet of snag-boats and salvage craft, he was afforded the much prized courtesy title of "Captain" by the rivermen of the Mississippi and was addressed as Captain Eads throughout his life.

== Civil War ==
In 1861, after the outbreak of the American Civil War, Eads was called to Washington at the prompting of his friend, Attorney General Edward Bates, to consult on the defense of the Mississippi River. Soon afterward, he was contracted to construct the City-class ironclads for the United States Navy, and produced seven such ships within five months: St. Louis, Cairo, Carondelet, Cincinnati, Louisville, Mound City, and Pittsburgh. He also converted the river steamer New Era into the ironclad Essex. The river ironclads were a vital element in the highly successful Federal offensive into Tennessee, Kentucky and upper Mississippi (February–June, 1862). Eads corresponded frequently with Navy officers of the Western Flotilla, and used their "combat lessons learned" to improve vessels during post-combat repairs, and incorporate improvements into succeeding generations of gunboats. By the end of the war he would build more than 30 river ironclads.

The last were so hardy that the Navy sent them into service in the Gulf of Mexico, where they supported the successful Federal attack on the Confederate port city of Mobile. All senior officers in the Western Theater, including Grant and Sherman, agreed that Eads and his vessels had been vital to early victory in the West. The first four gunboats were built at the Eads' Union Marine Works in Carondelet, Missouri. The next three were built under Eads' contract at the Mound City (Illinois) Marine Railway and Shipyard. Eads' vessels were the first United States ironclads to enter combat. On January 11, 1862 the Eads-built ironclads St. Louis and Essex fought the Confederate gunboats CSS General Polk, CSS Ivy, and CSS Jackson at Lucas Bend, on the Mississippi River. Subsequently, on February 6, 1862, Eads' ironclads captured Fort Henry on the Tennessee River. This was over a month before the combat actions of the ironclads CSS Virginia and USS Monitor during the March 8–9, 1862 Battle of Hampton Roads.

During the war, Eads wrote a check to the War Department for $1,000 to help homeless Confederates and Union sympathizers. After the war, he held a fair to raise money for the thousands of homeless refugees in St. Louis.

== Mississippi River bridge ==
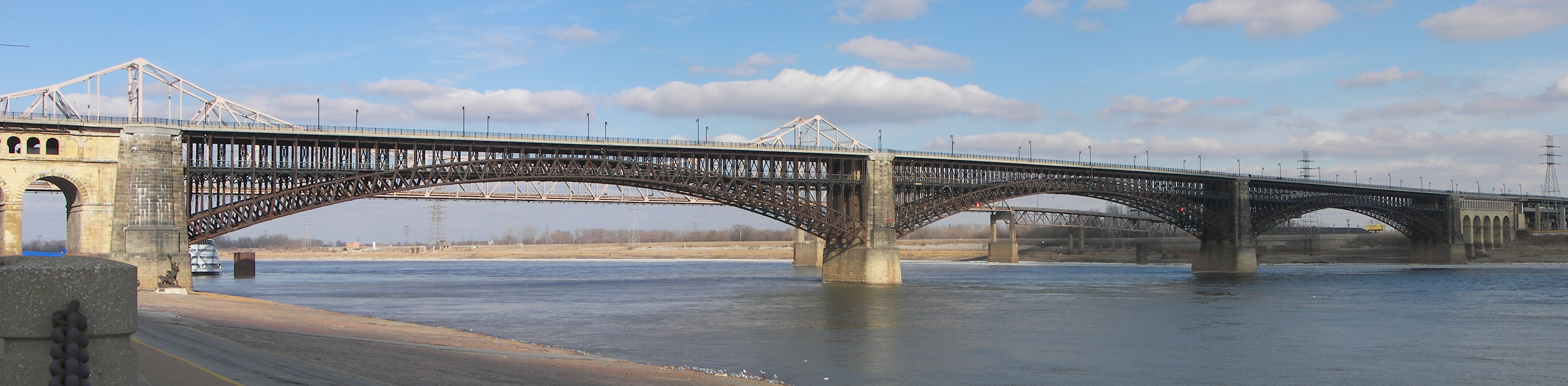
Eads Bridge, St. Louis

Eads designed and built the first road and rail bridge to cross the Mississippi River at St. Louis. The Eads Bridge, constructed from 1867 through 1874, was the first bridge of a significant size with steel as its primary material, and it was the longest arch bridge in the world when completed. Eads was the first bridge builder to employ the cantilever method, which allowed steamboat traffic to continue using the river during construction. The bridge is still in use today, carrying both automobile and light rail traffic over the river.

== Mississippi River designs ==
The Mississippi in the 100-mile-plus stretch between the port of New Orleans, Louisiana and the Gulf of Mexico frequently suffered from silting up of its outlets, stranding ships or making parts of the river unnavigable for a period of time. Eads solved the problem with a wooden jetty system that narrowed the main outlet of the river, causing the river to speed up and cut its channel deeper, allowing year-round navigation. Eads offered to build the jetties first, and charge the government later. If he was successful, and the jetties caused the river to cut a channel 30 feet deep for 20 years, the government agreed to pay him $8 million. The jetty system was installed in 1876 and the channel was cleared in February 1877. Journalist Joseph Pulitzer, who had known Eads for five years, invested $20,000 in this project. In 1879 the Eads design of jettys at the mouth of the Mississippi River proved to be successful. A flood in 1890 brought calls for a similar system for the entire Mississippi Valley. A jetty system would prevent the floods by deepening the main channel. However, there were concerns about the ability of water moving through a jetty system to cut out the rock and clay on the river bottom. The development of navigable channels at the mouth of the Mississippi River made Eads famous.

In 1982, the American Society of Civil Engineers designated the south pass jetties as a National Historic Civil Engineering Landmark.

== Other work ==
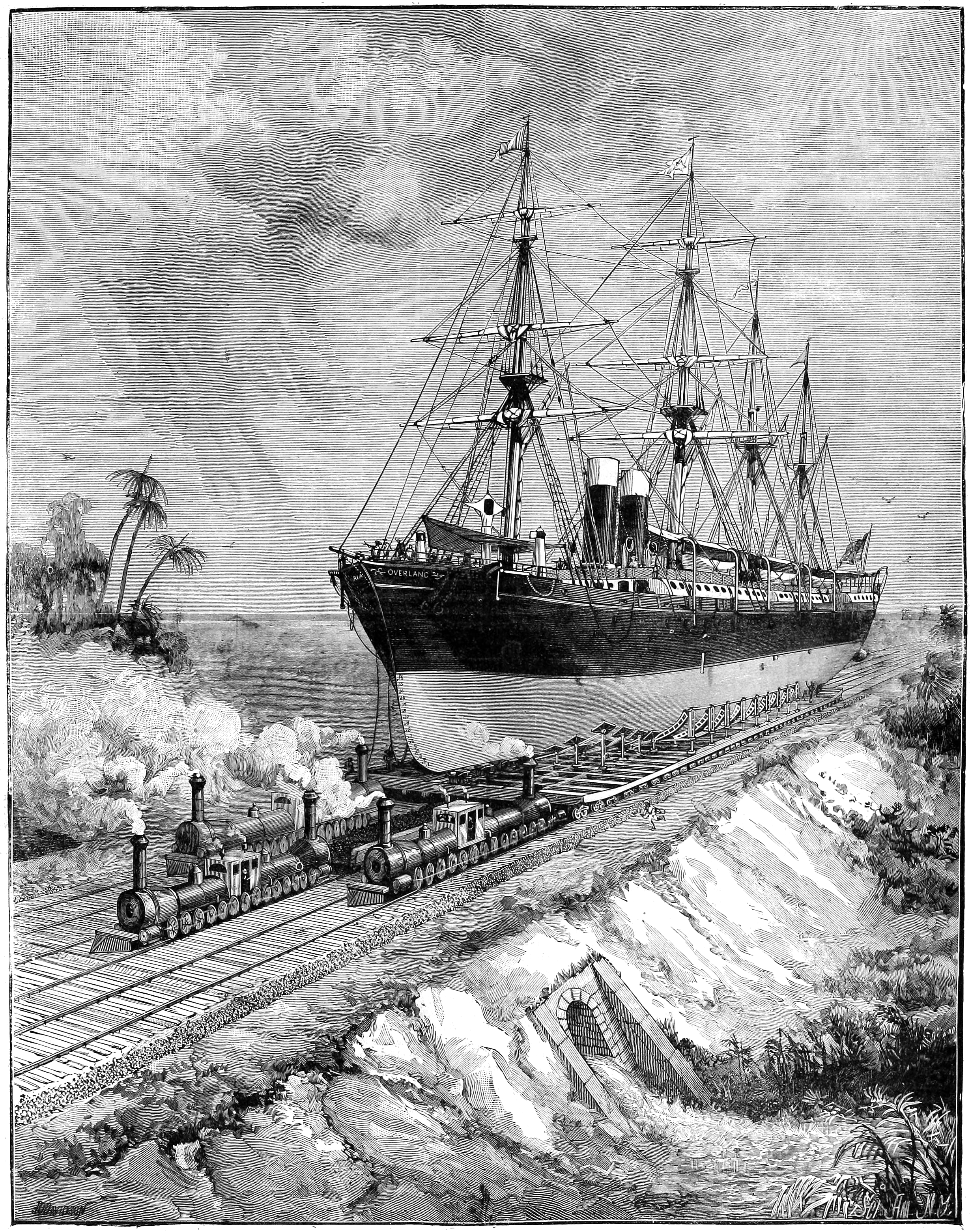
Contemporary illustration of Eads' proposal for an Interoceanic Ship Railway

Eads designed a gigantic railway system intended for construction at the Isthmus of Tehuantepec, which would carry ocean-going ships across the isthmus from the Gulf of Mexico to the Pacific Ocean; this attracted some interest but was never constructed.

In 1884 he became the first U.S. citizen awarded the Albert Medal of the Royal Society of the Arts.

== Later life and death ==
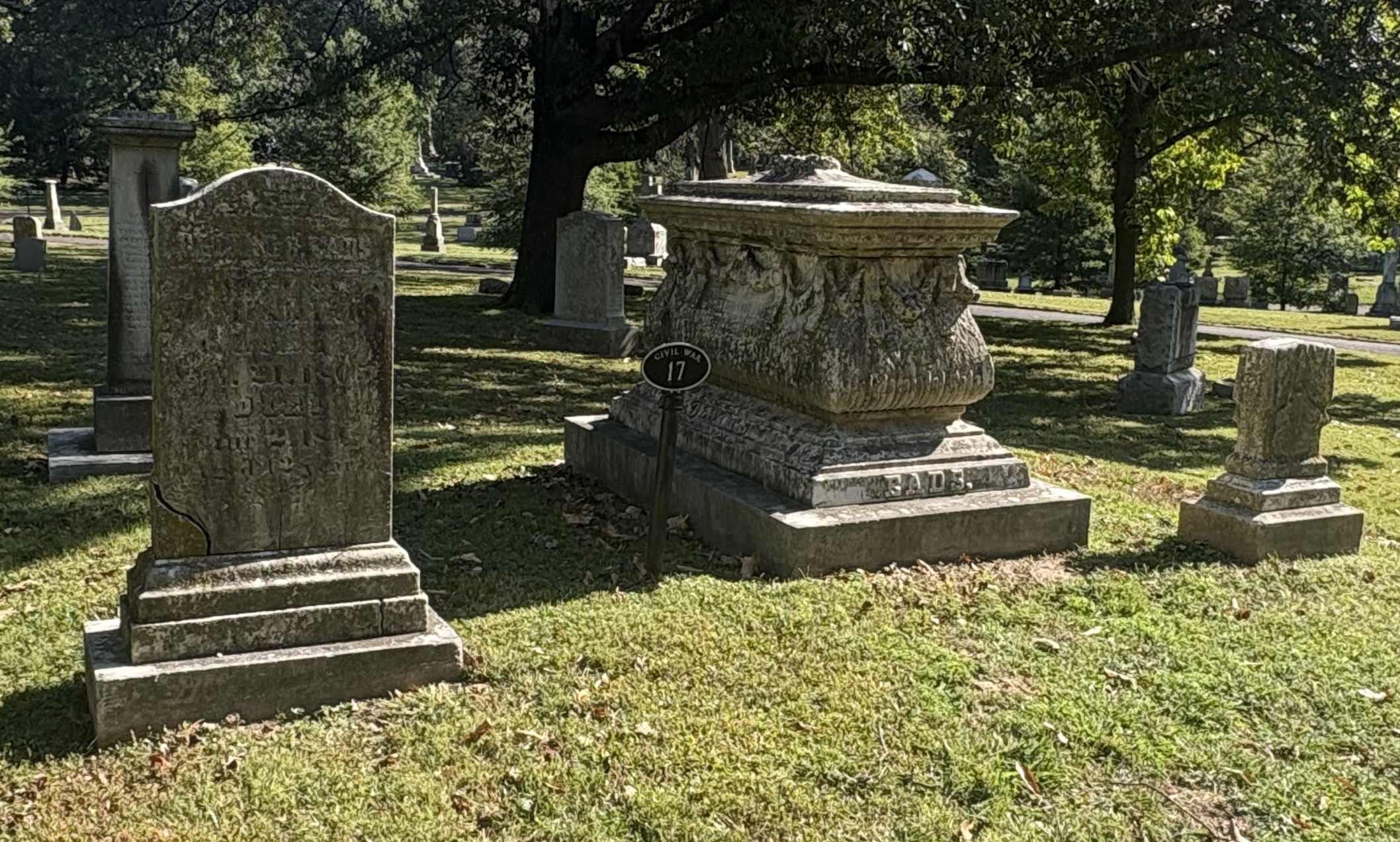
Eads' grave at Bellefontaine Cemetery

Eads' accomplishments throughout his life earned him wealth and renown. The Scientific American proposed that he run for president of the United States.

Eads died while on vacation in Nassau, Bahamas, aged 66. Eads and his second wife, Eunice, had moved to New York four years before his death. However, his funeral took place in St. Louis and he was buried in Bellefontaine Cemetery in St. Louis, Missouri in the family vault.

== Legacy ==
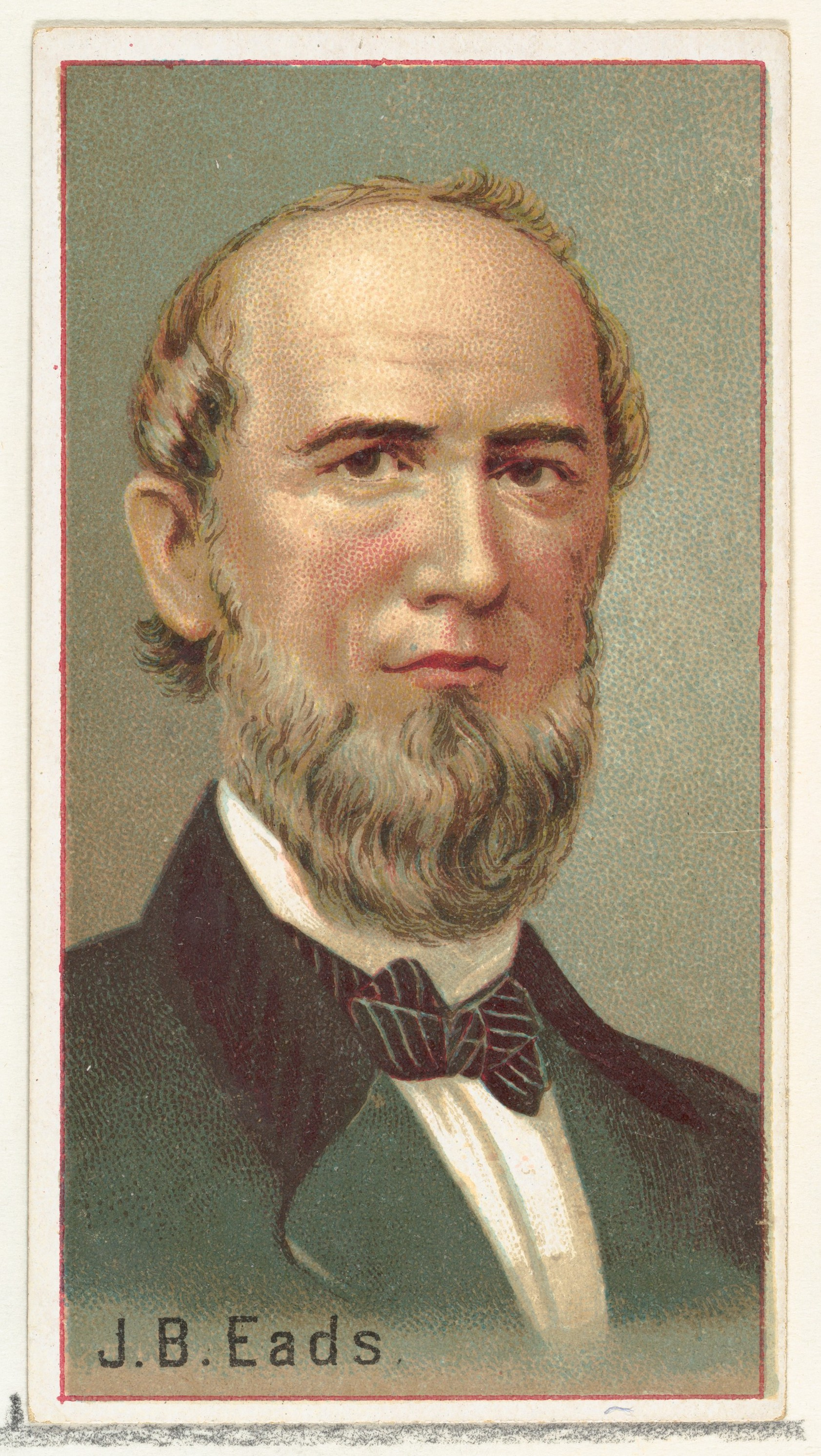
1888 color lithograph of J. B. Eads, made for Allen & Ginter Cigarettes

The towns of Eads, Tennessee; Eads, Colorado; and Port Eads, Louisiana are named for him.

U.S. Route 50 through Lawrenceburg, his hometown, is called Eads Parkway in his honor.

Eads Street is a street running parallel to U.S. Route 1/Richmond Highway in Crystal City, Arlington Virginia.

In 1920, Eads was added to the Hall of Fame for Great Americans colonnade, located on the grounds of the Bronx Community College in New York.

Eads is memorialized at Washington University in St. Louis by James B. Eads Hall, a 19th-century building long associated with science and technology. Eads Hall was the site of Professor Arthur Holly Compton's Nobel Prize–winning experiments in electromagnetic radiation. Today Eads Hall continues to serve Washington University as the site of a number of facilities including the Arts and Sciences Computing Center. Eads Hall was the gift of Captain Eads's daughter Mrs. James Finney How.

Each year the Academy of Science of St. Louis awards the James B. Eads Award recognizing a distinguished individual for outstanding achievement in science and technology.

Eads is recognized with a star on the St. Louis Walk of Fame.

In 1927, the deans of America's engineering colleges vote Eads one of the top five engineers of all time, an accolade he shared with Leonardo da Vinci, James Watt, Ferdinand de Lesseps, and Thomas A. Edison.

Eads Bridge was designated a National Historic Landmark by the Department of the Interior in 1964 and on October 21, 1974 was listed as a National Historic Civil Engineering Landmark by the American Society of Civil Engineers. It was also awarded a Special Award of Recognition by the American Institute of Steel Construction in 1974 on the 100th anniversary of its entry into service. Eads also designed the jetties of the south pass of the Mississippi River, which were designated as National Historic Civil Engineering Landmarks in 1982.
