= Poisson (surname) =

Poisson is a French surname meaning "fish". Notable people with the surname include:

- Abel-François Poisson, marquis de Marigny (1727–1781), French nobleman who served as the director general of the King's Buildings
- Albert Poisson (1868–1893), French alchemist
- David Poisson (politician) (born 1951), American politician
- David Poisson (alpine skier) (1982–2017), French alpine skier
- Émile Poisson (1905–1999), Beninese politician
- Eric Poisson (born 1965), Canadian gravitational physicist
- Georges Poisson (1924–2022), French art historian
- Gilles Poisson (born 1947), Canadian professional wrestler
- Jean-Frédéric Poisson (born 1963), French politician
- Jeanne Antoinette Poisson, Marquise de Pompadour (1721–1764), better known as Madame de Pompadour, a member of the French court and the official chief mistress of Louis XV
- Pascal Poisson (born 1958), French cyclist
- Paul Poisson (actor) (1658–1735), French actor
- Paul Poisson (politician) (1887–1983), Canadian politician
- Philippe Poisson (born 1984), better known as Phil Fish, Canadian video game designer
- Philippe Poisson (actor) (1682–1743), French actor and playwright
- Pierre-Marie Poisson (1876–1953), French sculptor and medallist
- Raymond Poisson (1630–1690), French actor and playwright
- Siméon Denis Poisson (1781–1840), French mathematician, geometer, and physicist
