= Raymond Poisson =

French actor and playwright

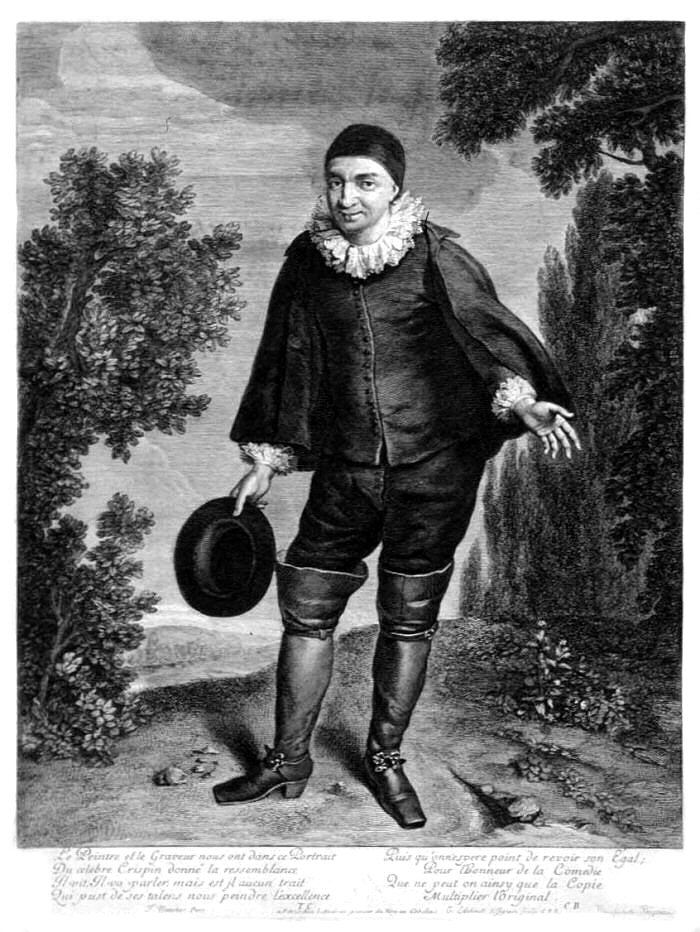
Poisson as Crispin

Raymond Poisson (1630–1690) was a French actor and playwright. Mainly a comic actor, he used the stage names Crispin in comedy and Belleroche in tragedy.

== Career ==
Poisson joined the company of the Hôtel de Bourgogne in Paris, primarily as a comic rival to Molière, who played at the Palais-Royal. As a comedian Poisson wore a black servant costume in a Spanish style and was noted for his stutter. He appropriated the character of Crispin from Scarron's L'Écolier de Salamanque (1654), playing it himself, and wrote and appeared in Lubin (1660) and Le Baron de la Crasse (1661).

He became a founding member of the Comédie-Française in 1680. His son Paul and his grandsons Philippe and Francois-Arnoul all became actors, whilst his granddaughter Madeleine-Angélique de Gomez became a writer.

== Bibliography ==
- Curtis, A. Ross (1972). Crispin Ier : la vie et l'œuvre de Raymond Poisson, comédien-poète du XVIIe siècle. University of Toronto Romance Series (in French). Toronto: University of Toronto Press. ISBN 0802052487. OCLC 1148619149 – via the Internet Archive.
- Gaines, James F., editor (2002). The Molière Encyclopedia. Westport, Connecticut: Greenwood Press. ISBN 9780313312557.
- Hartnoll, Phyllis, editor (1983). The Oxford Companion to the Theatre (fourth edition). Oxford: Oxford University Press. ISBN 9780192115461.
