= Pigs in culture =

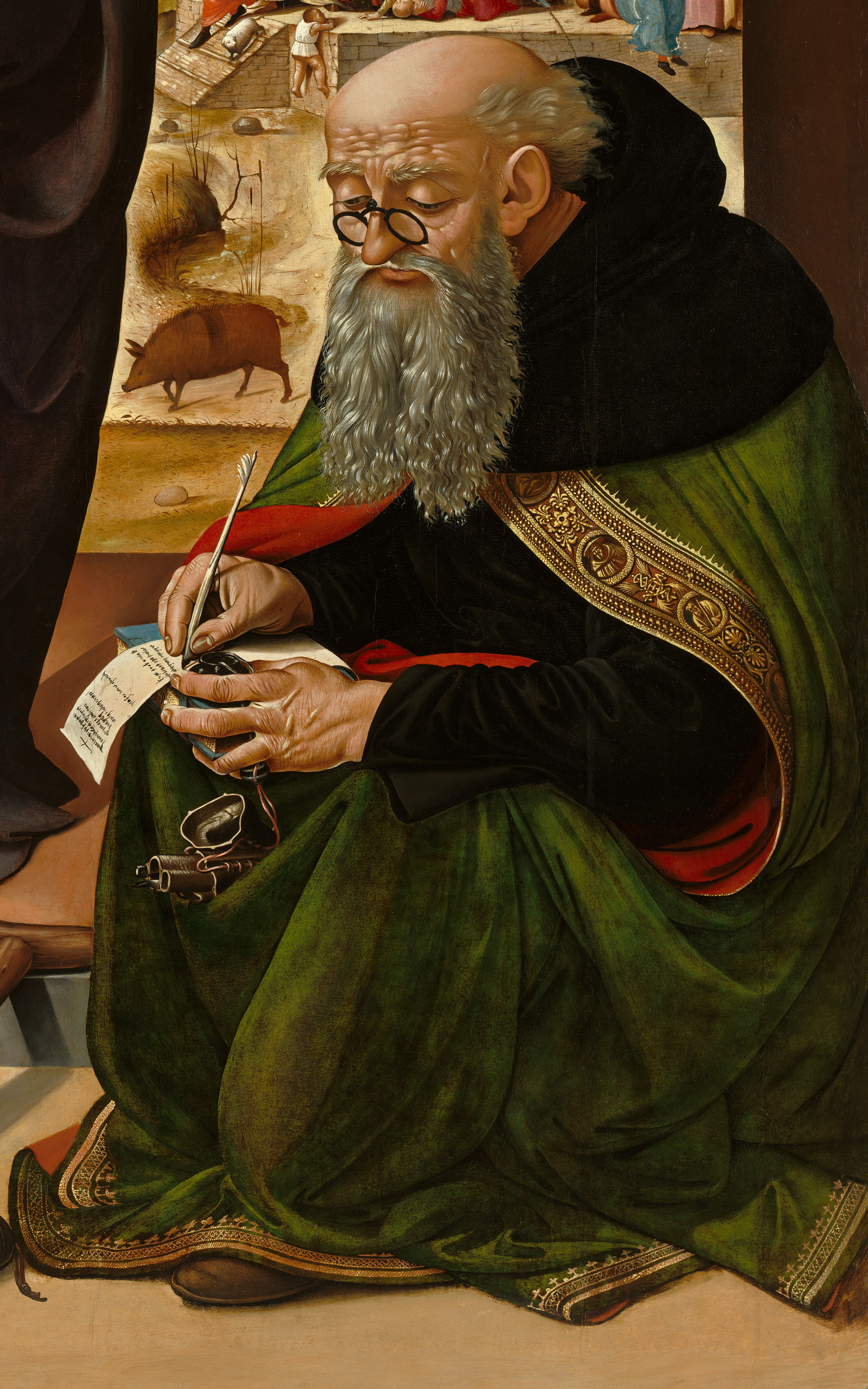
Painting of Saint Anthony with a pig in background by Piero di Cosimo c. 1480

Pigs, widespread in societies around the world since Neolithic times, have been used for many purposes in art, literature, and other expressions of human culture. In classical times, the Romans considered pork the finest of meats, enjoying sausages, and depicting them in their art. Across Europe, pigs have been celebrated in carnivals since the Middle Ages, becoming especially important in Medieval Germany in cities such as Nuremberg, and in early modern Italy in cities such as Bologna.

In literature, both for children and adults, pig characters appear in allegories, comic stories, and serious novels. In art, pigs have been represented in a wide range of media and styles from the earliest times in many cultures. Pig names are used in idioms and animal epithets, often derogatory, since pigs have long been linked with dirtiness and greed, while places such as Swindon are named for their association with swine. The eating of pork is forbidden in Islam and Judaism, but pigs are sacred in some other religions.

== Celebration of meat ==
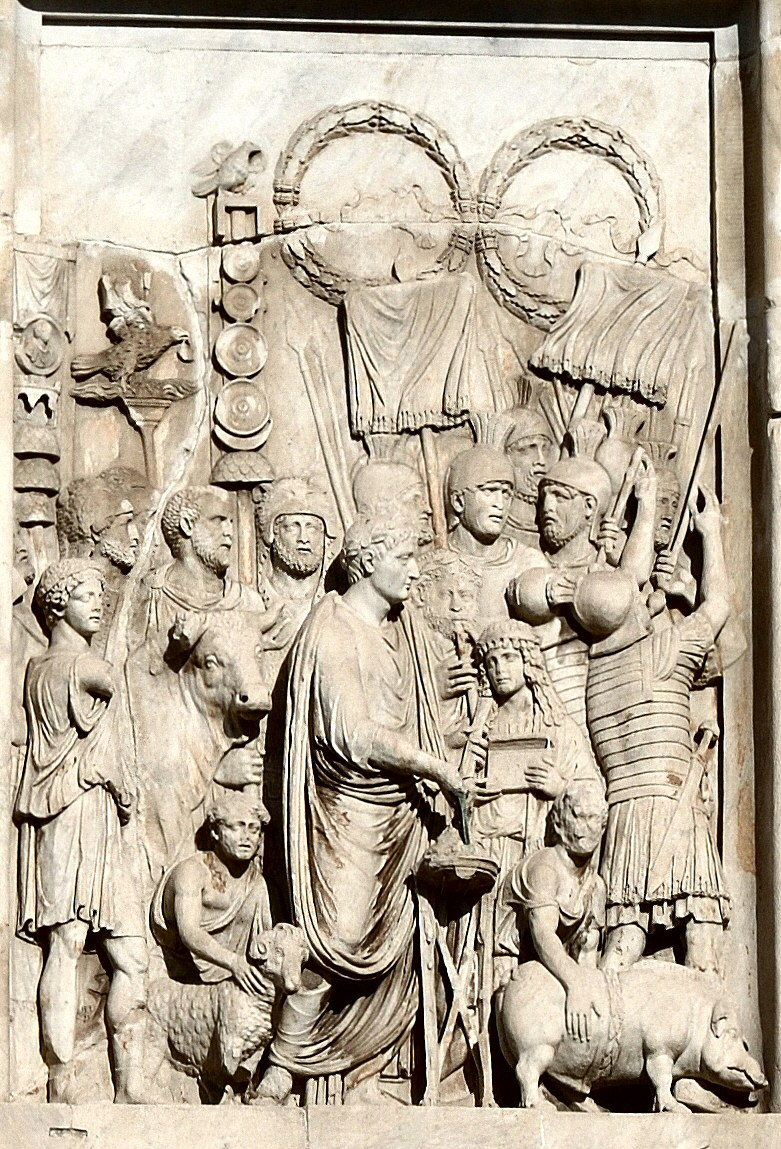
Arch of Constantine, relief panel showing lustration of the troops of Marcus Aurelius, with a fat pig at lower right

=== Classical times ===
The scholar Michael MacKinnon writes that "Pork was generally considered the choicest of all the domestic meats consumed during Roman times, and it was ingested in a multitude of forms, from sausages to steaks, by rich and poor alike. No other animal had so many Latin names (e.g., sus, porcus, porco, aper) or was the ingredient in so many ancient recipes as outlined in the culinary manual of Apicius." Pigs have been found at almost every archaeological site in Roman Italy; they are described by Roman agricultural writers such as Cato and Varro, and in Pliny the Elder's Natural History. MacKinnon notes that ancient breeds of pig can be seen on monuments such as the Arch of Constantine, which portrays a lop-eared, fat-bellied, and smooth breed.

=== Carnival ===
The pig has been celebrated throughout Europe since ancient times in its carnivals, the name coming from the Italian carne levare, the lifting of meat. But the scholars Peter Stallybrass and Allon White comment on the pig's ambiguous role:

In the fair and the carnival, we would expect to find a quite different orientation toward the pig: in 'carne-levare' the pig was celebrated; the pleasures of food were represented in the sausage and the rites of inversion were emblematized in the pig's bladder of the fool. ... Even in the carnival the pig was the locus of conflicting meanings. If the pig was duly celebrated, it could also become the symbolic analogy of scapegoated groups and demonized 'Others'.

=== Chinese tradition ===
In early China pigs were valued not only for eating, but even more for producing fertilizer, as well as fat for lamps, skin for clothing, and bristles for brushes. They also had symbolic value. Aristocrats showed their rank by being entombed with more pigs than were lower ranks. Their ability to grow and reproduce quickly led to pigs being associated with fertility, prosperity, good luck, and a large family. By around the 2nd century C. E. the grave goods in tombs of the wealthy included pig figures, not actual pigs, perhaps to give the departed enough wealth to prosper in the underworld, perhaps to encourage them to bless their descendants. The pig-sty-latrine was common; clay models appear in many Han Dynasty tombs.

"Pig" is one of the twelve signs of the Chinese Zodiac. A folk etymology mistakenly holds that the Chinese character 家, jia (“home” or “family”) shows a pig under a roof, but this is actually a child under a roof. The favorable association explains the mistake.

=== English tradition ===
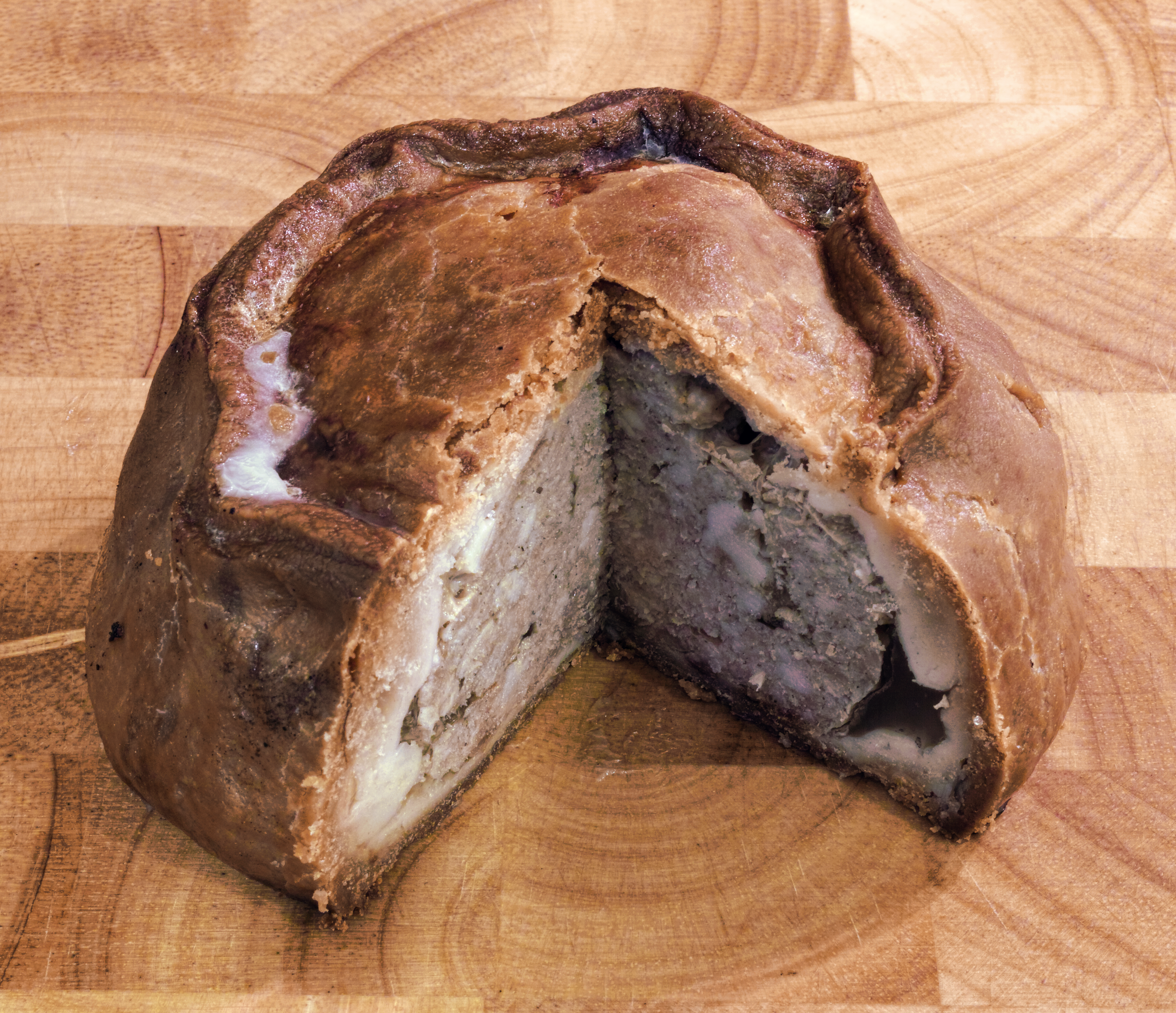
A Melton Mowbray pork pie

In England, pork pies were being made in Melton Mowbray, Leicestershire by the 1780s, according to the Melton Mowbray Pork Pie Association (founded in 1998). The pies were originally baked in a clay pot with a pastry cover, developing to their modern form of a pastry case. Local tradition states that farm hands carried these while at work; aristocratic fox hunters of the Quorn, Cottesmore and Belvoir hunts supposedly saw this and acquired a taste for the pies. A slightly later date of origin is given by the claim that pie manufacture in the town began around 1831 when a local baker and confectioner, Edward Adcock, started to make pies as a sideline. Melton Mowbray pork pies were granted PGI status in 2008.

=== German tradition ===
German cities such as Nuremberg have made pork sausages since at least 1315 AD, when the Würstlein (sausage controller) office was introduced. Some 1500 types of sausage are produced in the country. The Nuremberg bratwurst is required to be at most 90 millimetres (3.5 in) long and to weigh at most 25 grams (0.88 oz); it is flavoured with mace, pepper, and marjoram. In Early Modern times starting in 1614, Nuremberg's butchers paraded through the city each year carrying a 400 metres (440 yd) long sausage.

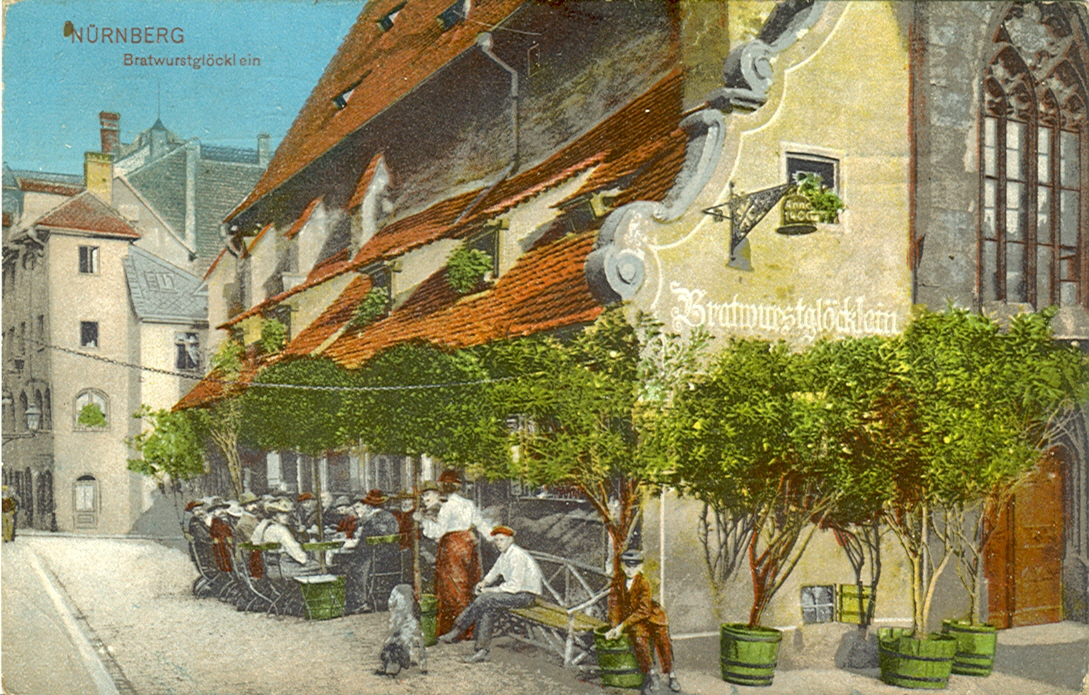
The Bratwurst Glöcklein ("Little-bell sausages"), Germany's most renowned inn of the time, founded in Nuremberg in the 14th century. The inn was destroyed in the Second World War. 1914 postcard.

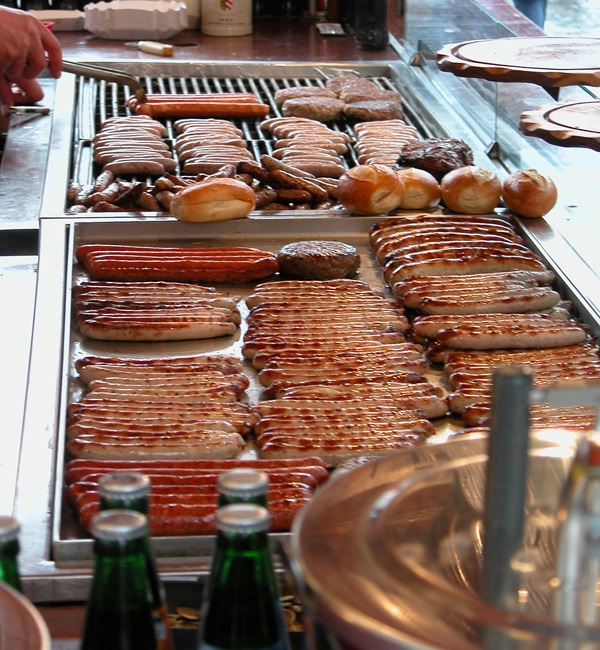
A range of Bratwurst grilled sausages at the main market in Nuremberg

=== Italian tradition ===
The pig, and pork products such as mortadella, were economically important in Italian cities such as Bologna and Modena in the Early Modern period, and celebrated as such; they have remained so into modern times. In 2019, the Istituzione Biblioteche Bologna held an exhibition Pane e salame. Immagini gastronomiche bolognesi dalle raccolte dell'Archiginnasio ("Bread and salami. Bolognese gastronomic images from the Archiginnasio collection") on the gastronomic images in its collection.

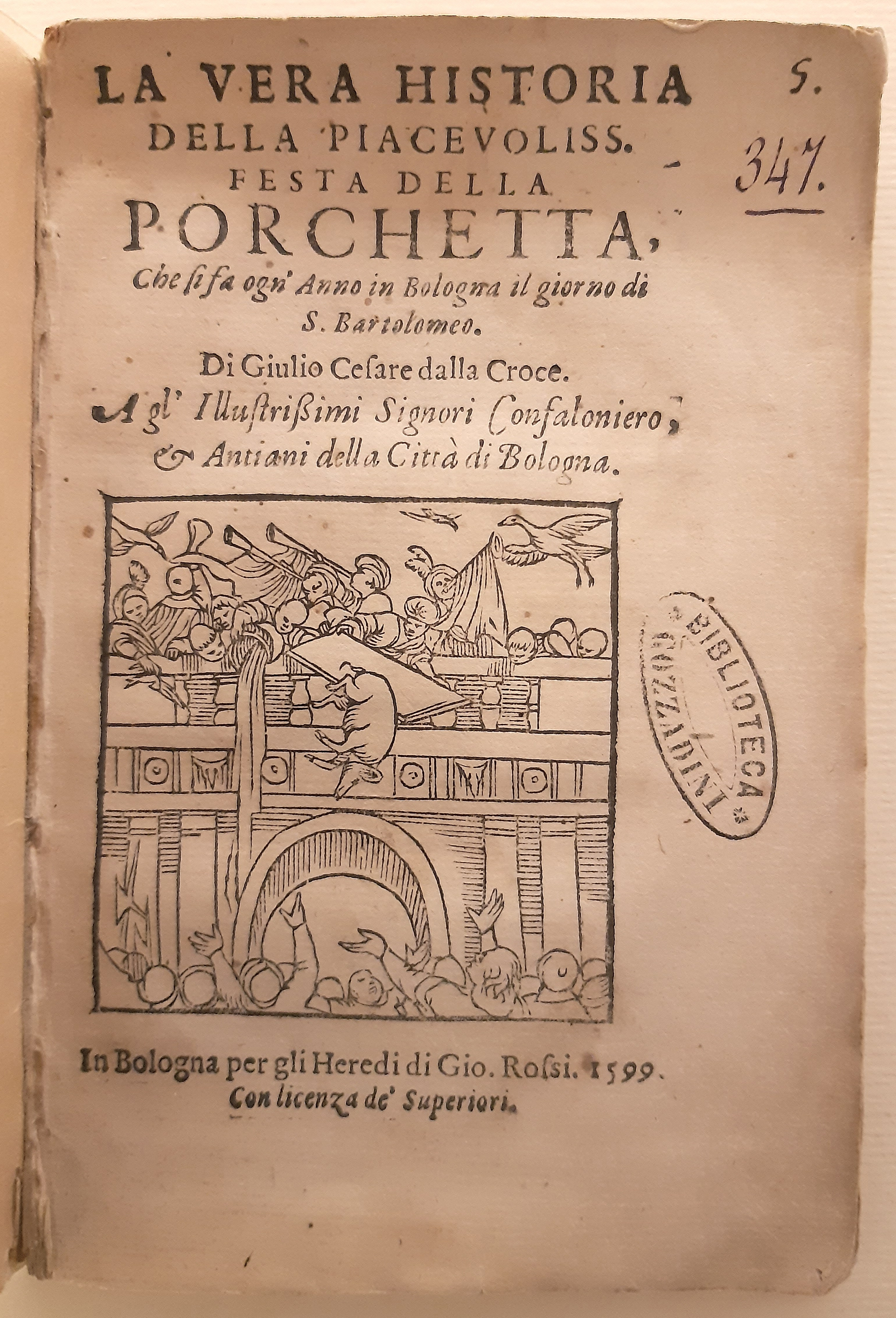
La Vera Historia della Piacevolissima Festa Della Porchetta ("The True History of the Most Pleasant Feast of the Little Pig") by Giulio Cesare Croce, Bologna, 1599

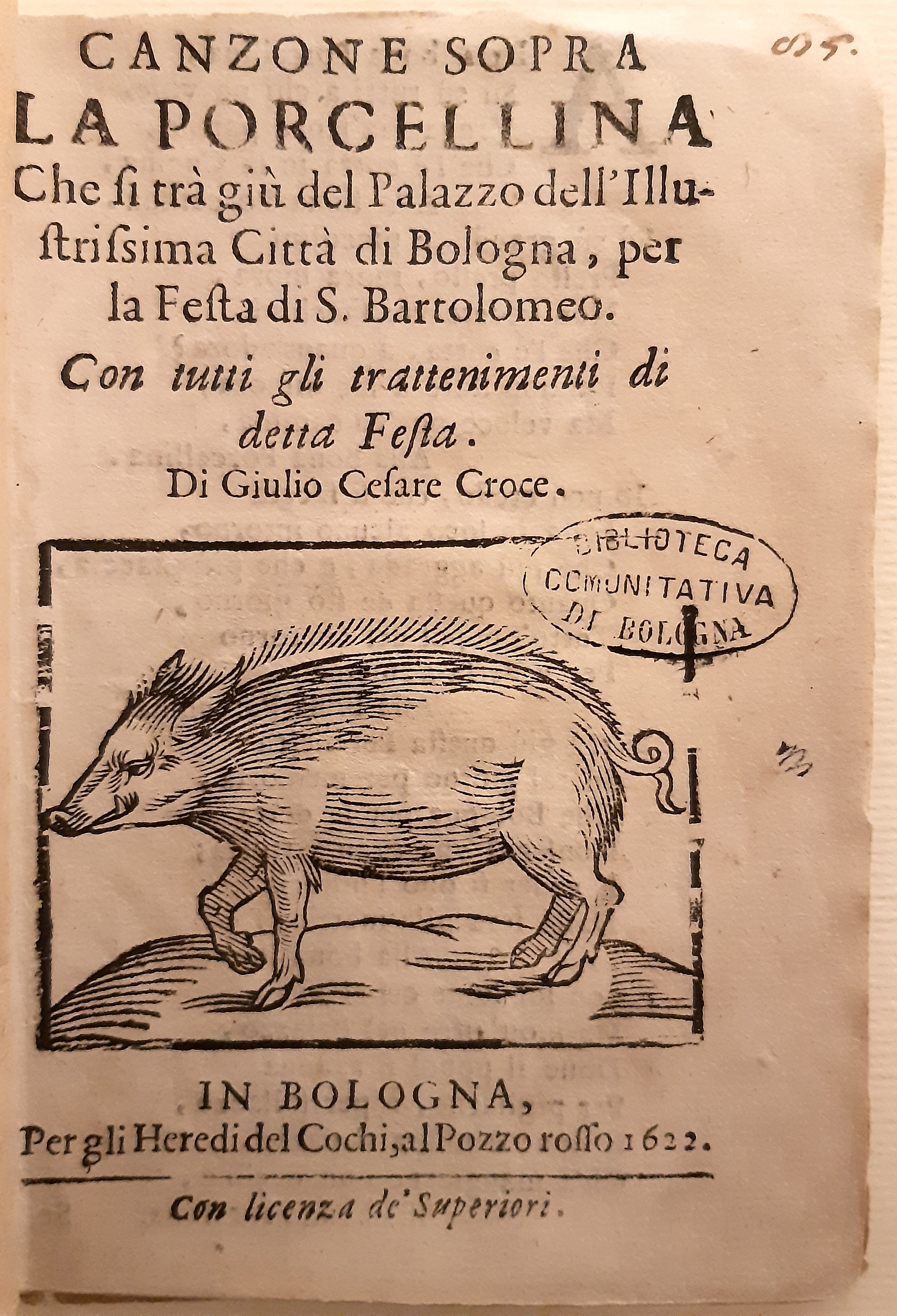
Canzone Sopra La Porcellina ("Song Upon the Piglet") by Giulio Cesare Croce, Bologna, 1622

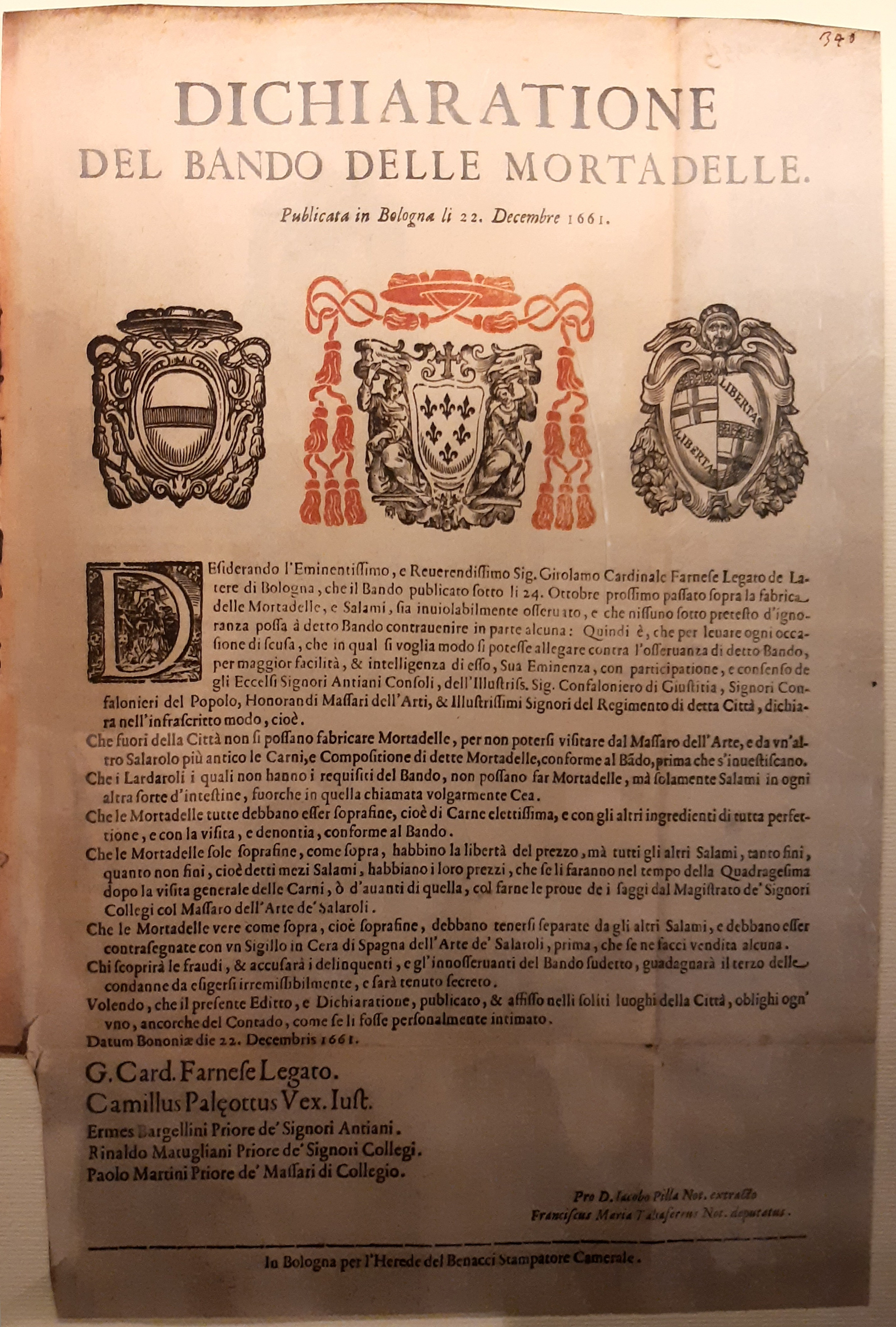
Dichiarazione del Bando delle Mortadelle ("Declaration of the Band of the Mortadellas"), Bologna, 1661

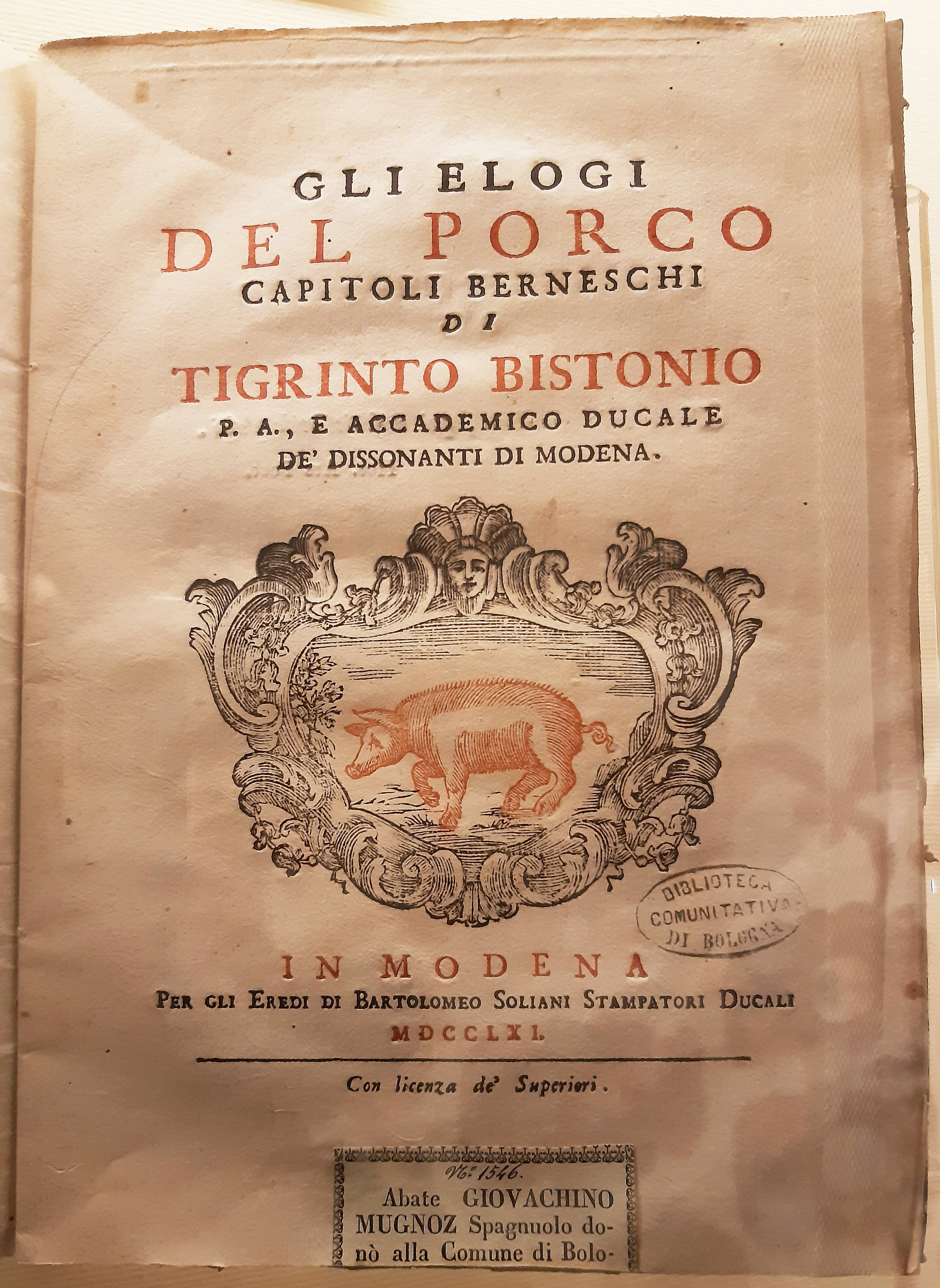
Gli Elogi del Porco ("The Praises of the Pig"), Modena, 1761

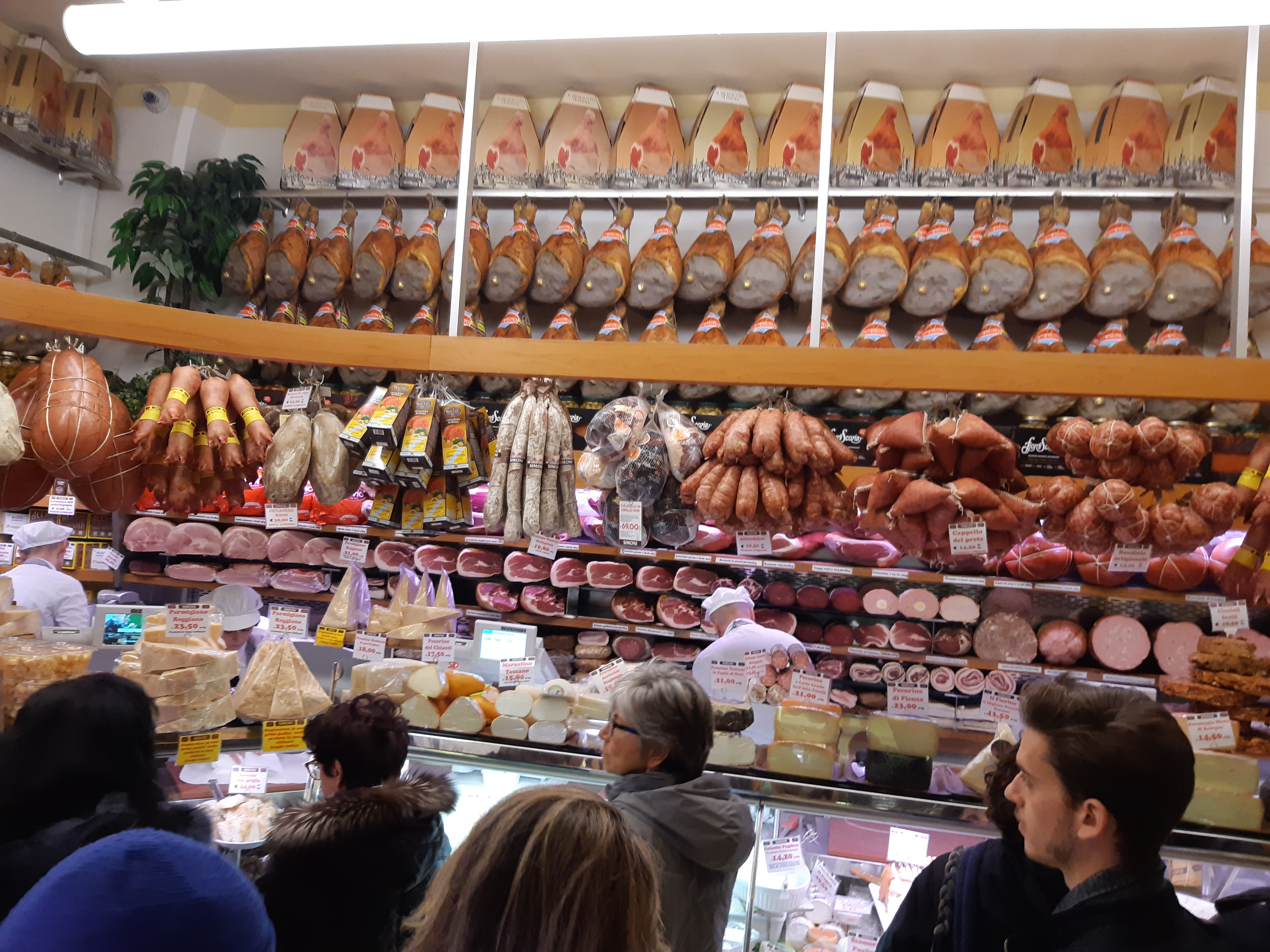
Hams, pigs' trotters, sausages, and mortadella in Bologna, 2019

== Literature ==
=== For adults ===
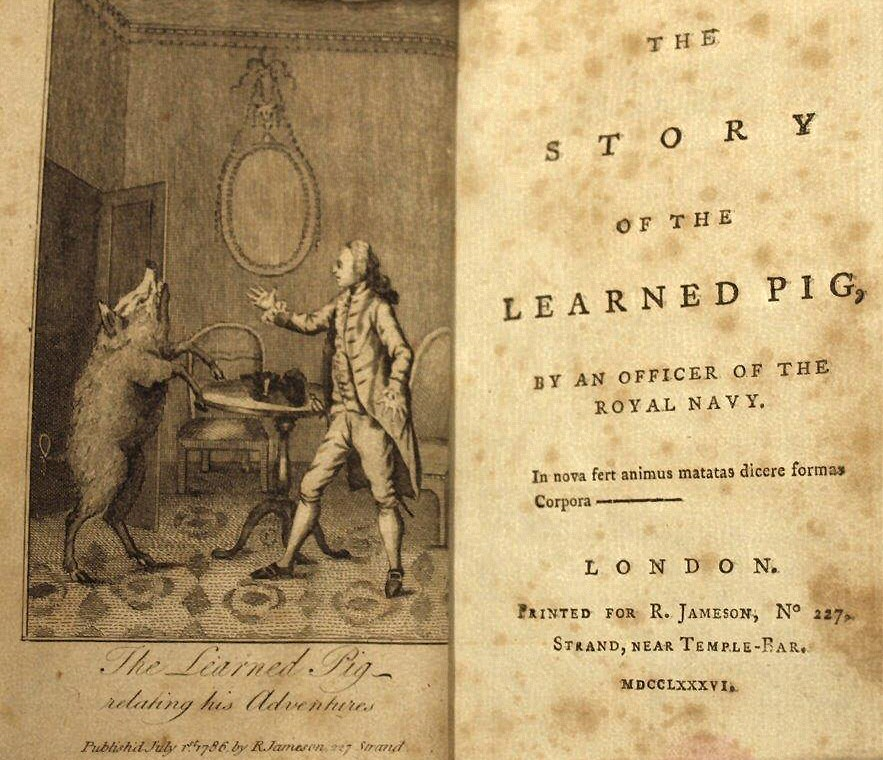
The Story of the Learned Pig by an Officer of the Royal Navy, 1786

Pigs have appeared in literature with a variety of associations, ranging from the pleasures of eating, as in Charles Lamb's A Dissertation upon Roast Pig, to William Golding's Lord of the Flies (with the fat character "Piggy"), where the rotting boar's head on a stick represents Beelzebub, "lord of the flies" being the direct translation of the Hebrew בעל זבוב, and George Orwell's allegorical novel Animal Farm, where the central characters representing Soviet leaders are pigs. The pig is used to comic effect in P. G. Wodehouse's stories set in Blandings Castle, where the eccentric Lord Emsworth keeps an extremely fat prize pig called the Empress of Blandings which is frequently stolen, kidnapped or otherwise threatened. Quite a different use is made of the pig in Lloyd Alexander's fantasy books The Chronicles of Prydain, where Hen Wen is a pig with foresight, used to see the future and locate mystical items such as The Black Cauldron.

One of the earliest literary references comes from Heraclitus, who speaks of the preference pigs have for mud over clean water in the Fragments. Pigs held significance for both ancient Pyrrhonic philosophers (for whom the pig was representative of akrasia) and ancient Epicurean philosophers (for whom it was representative of pleasure-seeking). Plato in the Republic discusses a "healthy state" of simplicity as "a city for pigs" (Greek: huōn polis). In Wu Cheng'en's 16th-century Chinese novel Journey to the West, Zhu Bajie is part human, part pig. In books, poems and cartoons in 18th-century England, The Learned Pig was a trained animal who appeared to be able to answer questions. Thomas Hardy describes the killing of a pig in his 1895 novel Jude the Obscure.

=== For children ===
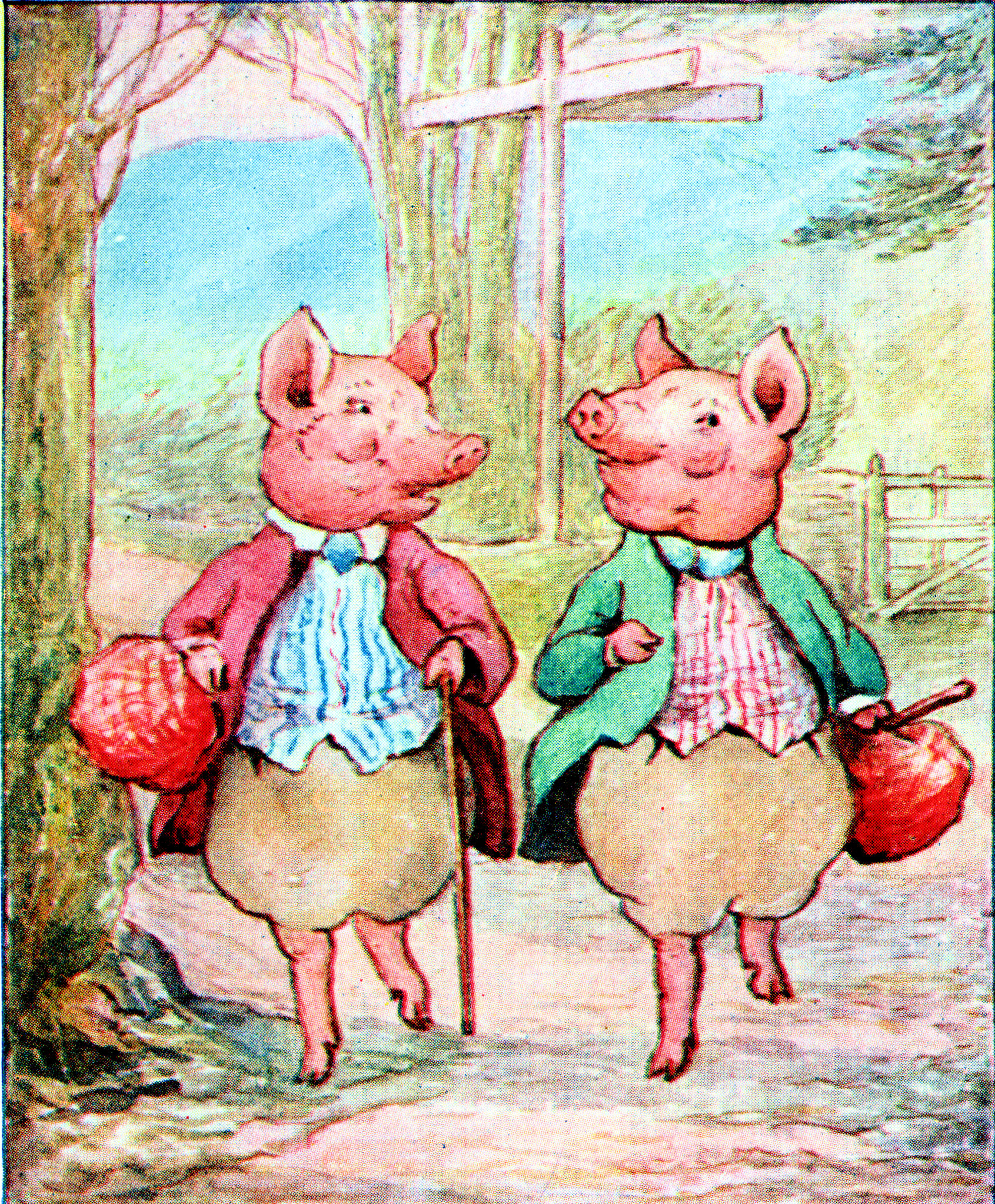
Pigling Bland setting out on his adventures

Pigs have featured in children's books since at least 1840, when Three Little Pigs appeared in print; the story has appeared in many different versions such as Disney's 1933 film and Roald Dahl's 1982 Revolting Rhymes. Even earlier is the popular 18th-century English nursery rhyme and fingerplay, "This Little Piggy", frequently in film and literature, such as the Warner Brothers cartoons A Tale of Two Kitties (1942) and A Hare Grows In Manhattan (1947) which use the rhyme to comic effect. Two of Beatrix Potter's "little books", The Tale of Pigling Bland (1913) and The Tale of Little Pig Robinson (1930), feature the adventures of pigs dressed as people.

Several animated cartoon series have included pigs as prominent characters. One of the earliest pigs in cartoon was the gluttonous "Piggy", who appeared in four Warner Brothers Merrie Melodies shorts between 1931 and 1937, most notably Pigs Is Pigs, and was followed by Porky Pig, with similar habits.

Piglet is Pooh's constant companion in A. A. Milne's Winnie the Pooh stories and the Disney films based on them, while in Charlotte's Web, the central character Wilbur is a pig who formed a relationship with a spider named Charlotte. The 1995 film Babe humorously portrayed a pig who wanted to be a herding dog, based on the character in Dick King-Smith's 1983 novel The Sheep Pig. Among new takes on the classic Three Little Pigs is Corey Rosen Schwartz and Dan Santat's 2012 The Three Ninja Pigs.

== Art ==
Pigs have appeared in art in media including pottery, sculpture, metalwork, engravings, oil paintings, watercolour, and stained glass, from neolithic times onwards. Some have functioned as amulets.

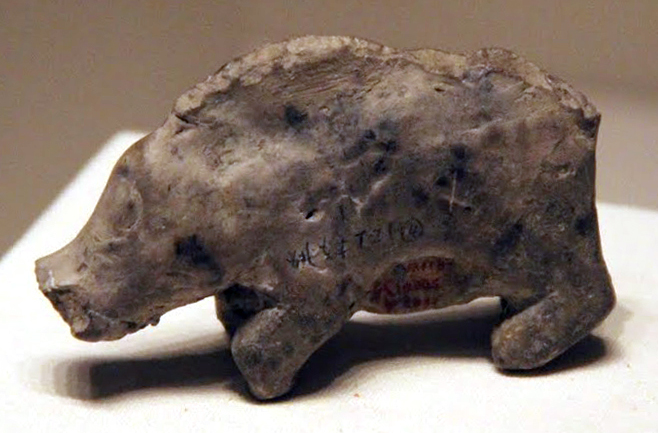
Neolithic pottery pig, Hemudu culture, Zhejiang, China

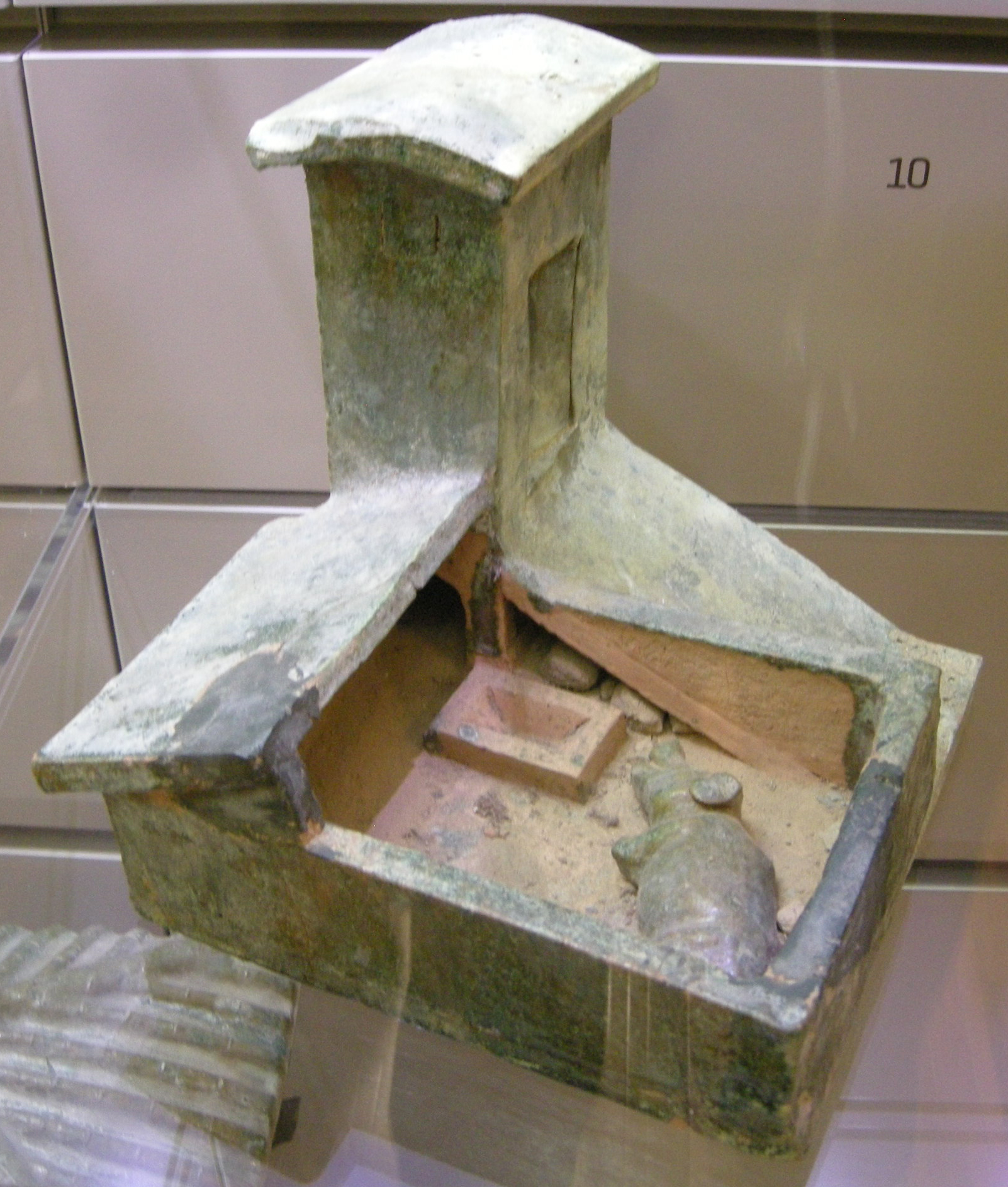
Han dynasty pig latrine

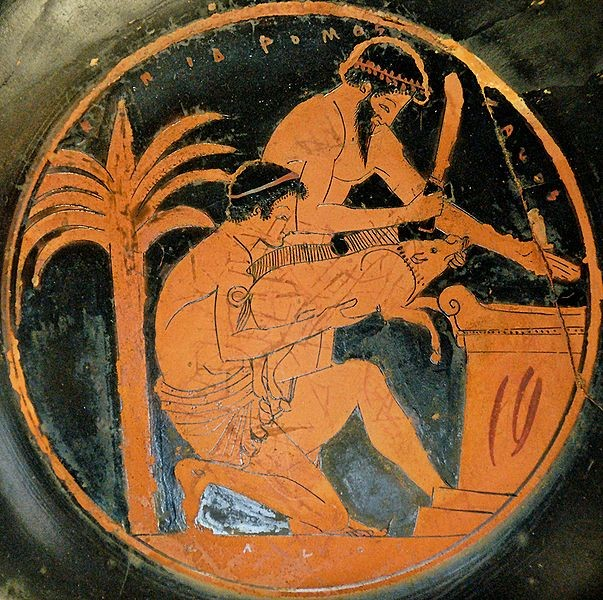
Two men sacrificing a pig to Demeter. red-figure pot, Ancient Greece

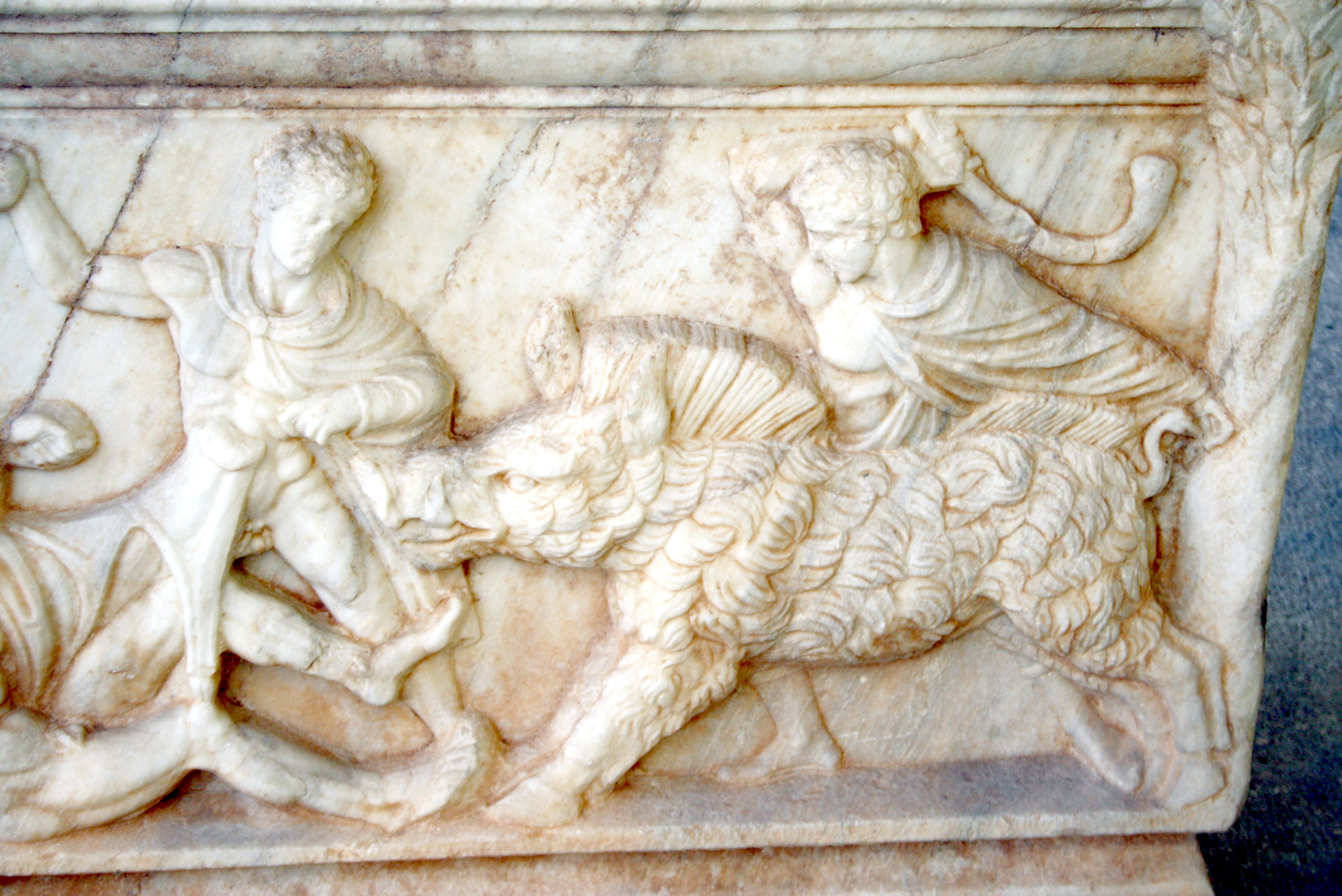
Sarcophagus with Calydonian Boar hunt. Athens, 2nd century

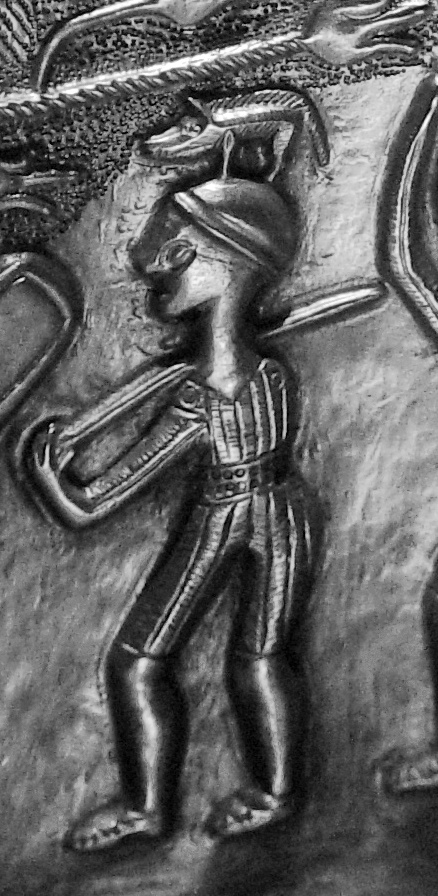
Boar-helmeted figure on the Gundestrup Cauldron. 3rd century

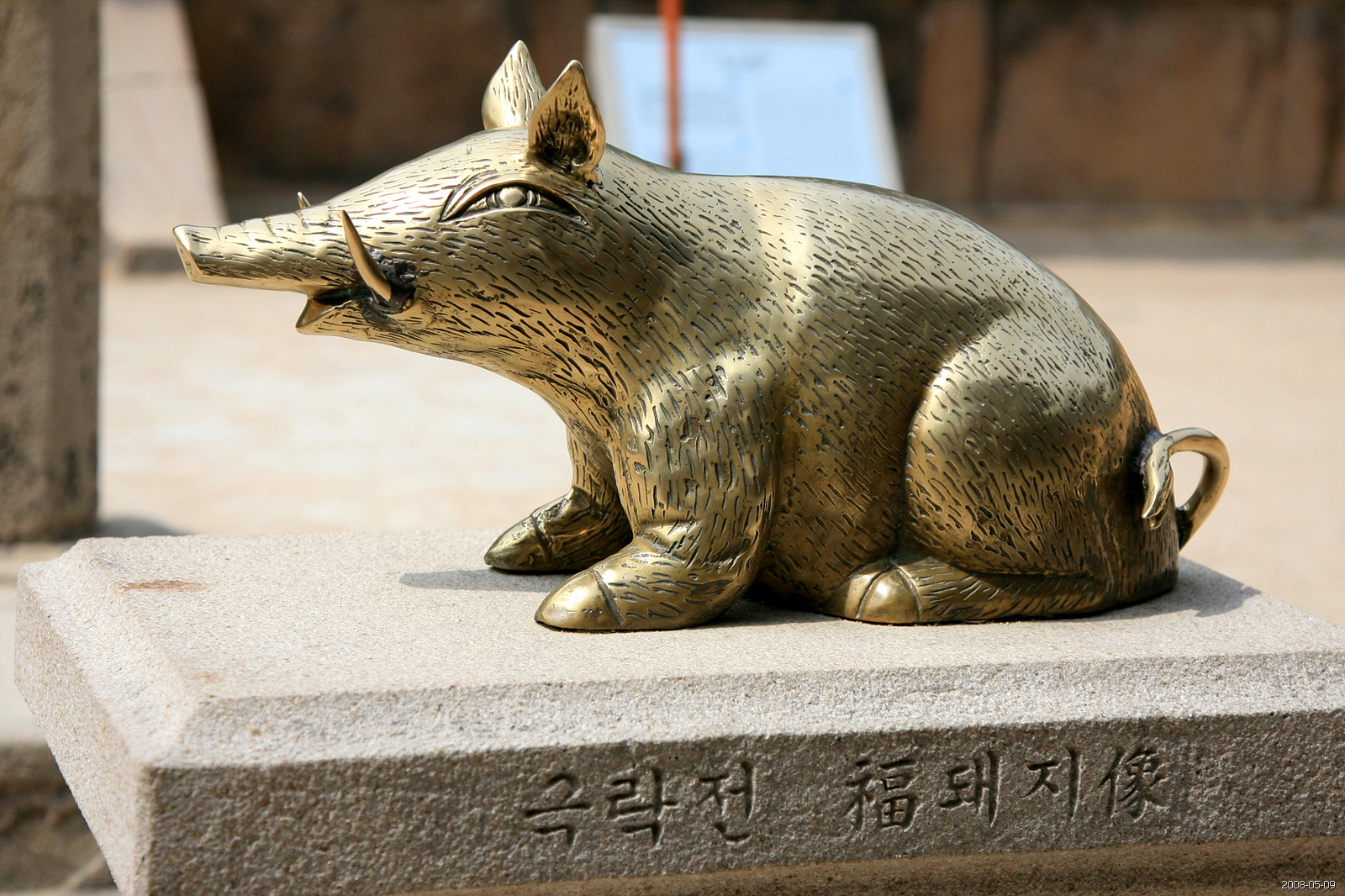
Gilt bronze pig, Gyeongju Temple, Bulguksa. Silla kingdom, Korea

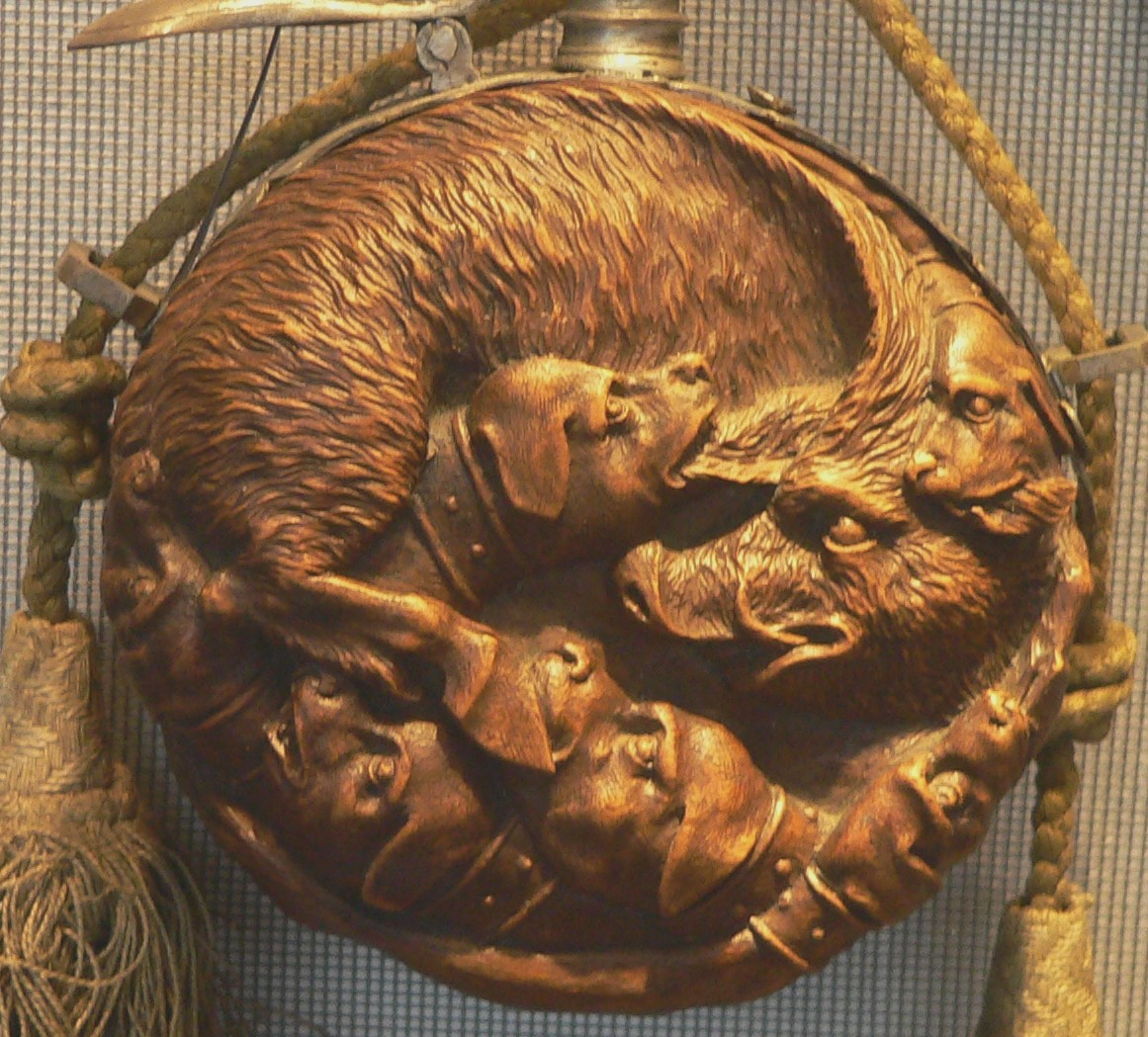
Wild boar with boarhounds. Silver powder flask, Germany, 16th century

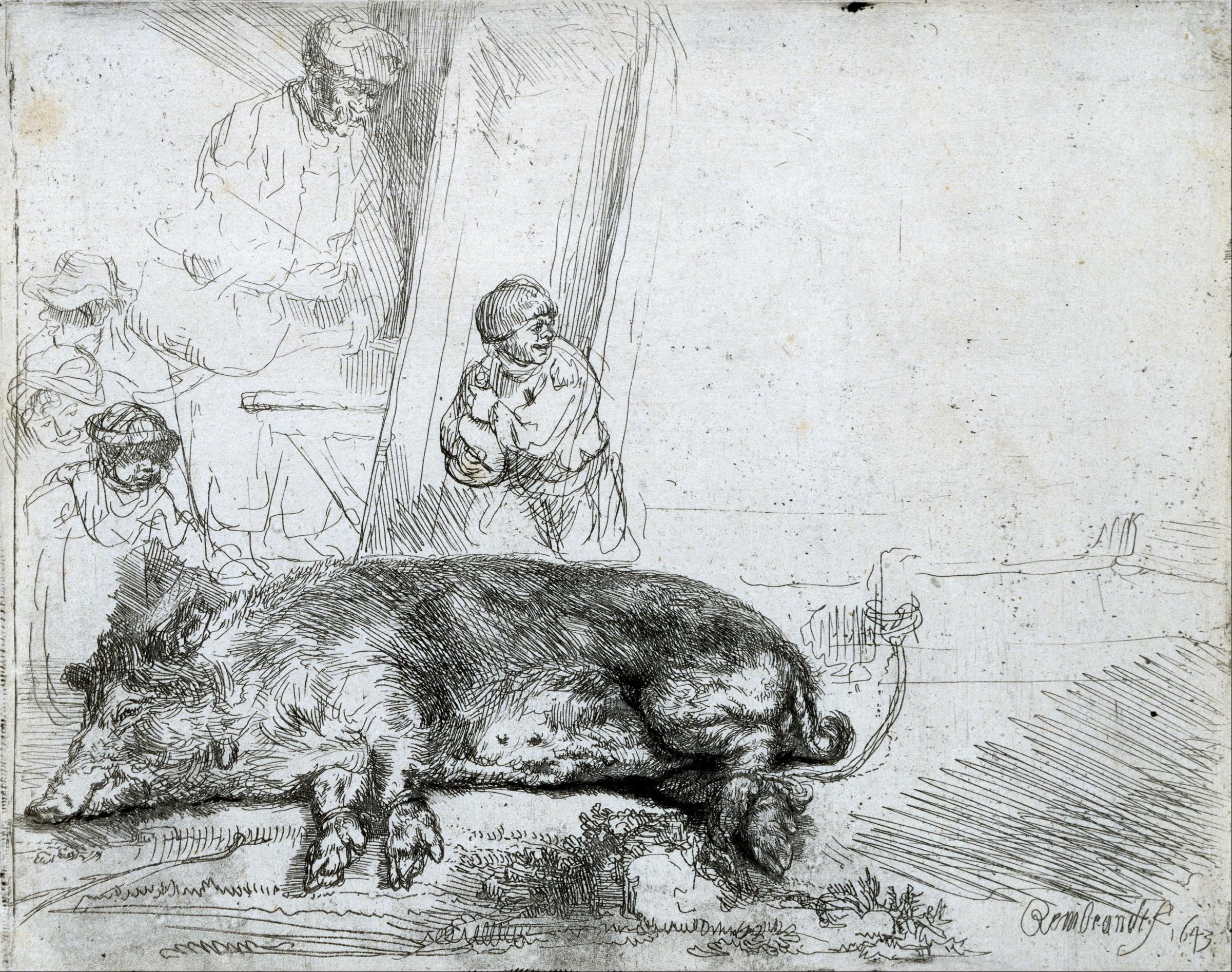
The Hog. Etching by Rembrandt van Rijn, 1643

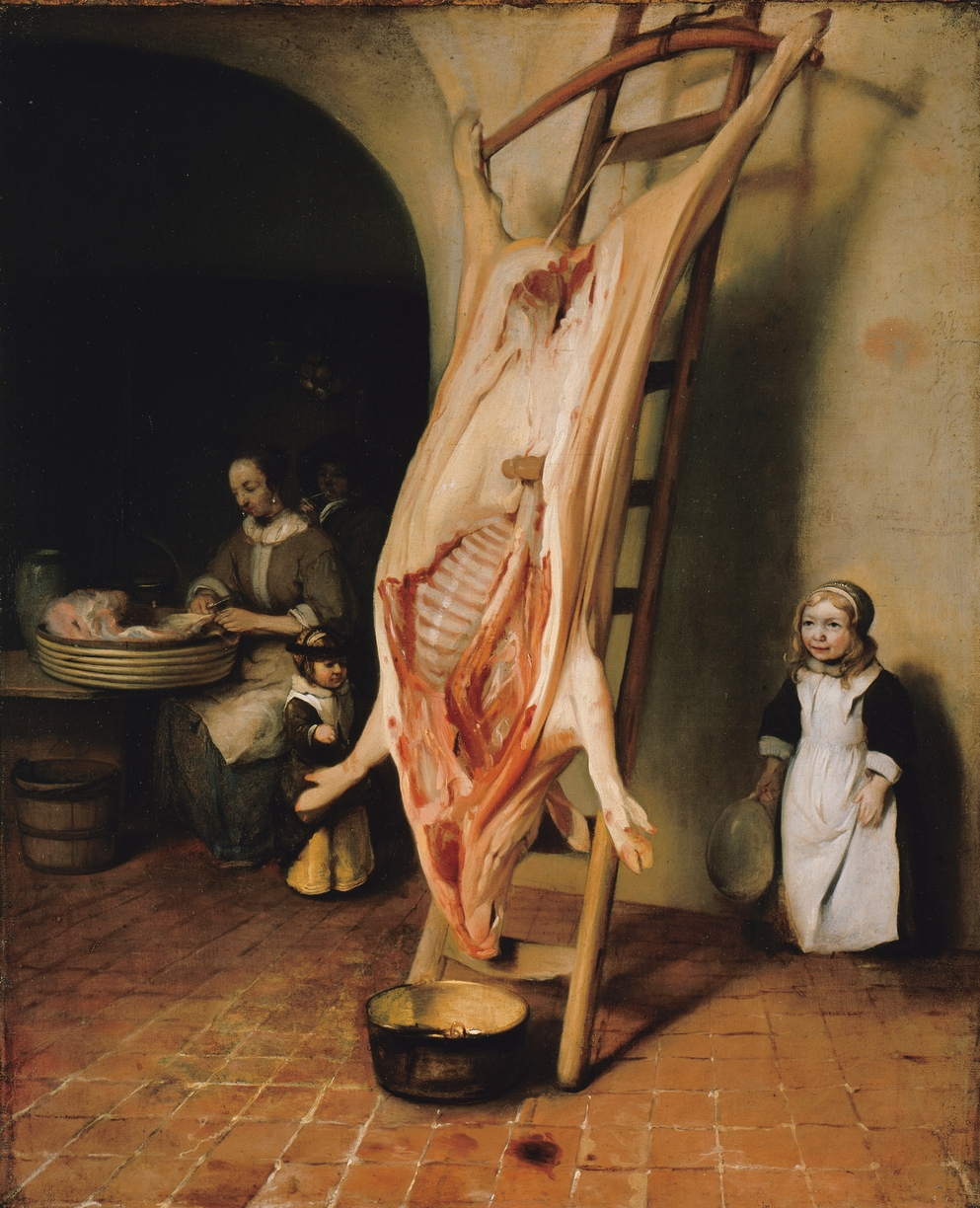
The Slaughtered Pig by Barent Fabritius, 1656

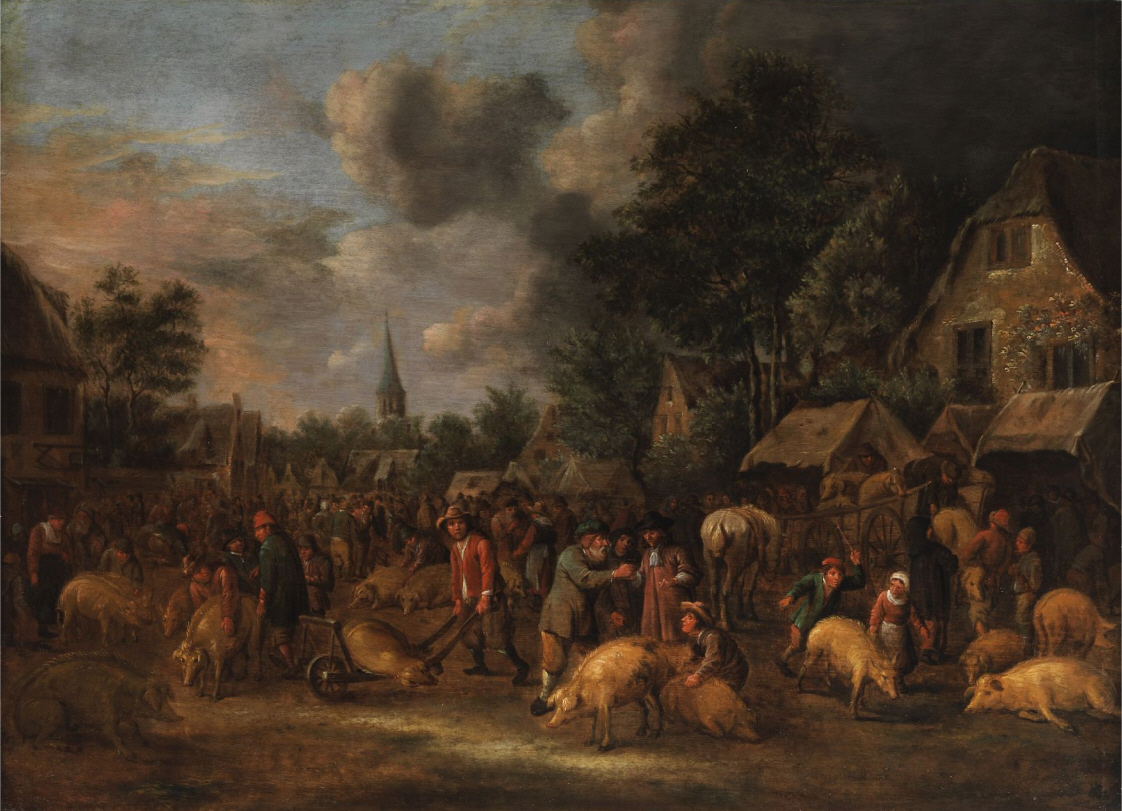
Pig market in a Dutch town by Nicolaes Molenaer, 17th century

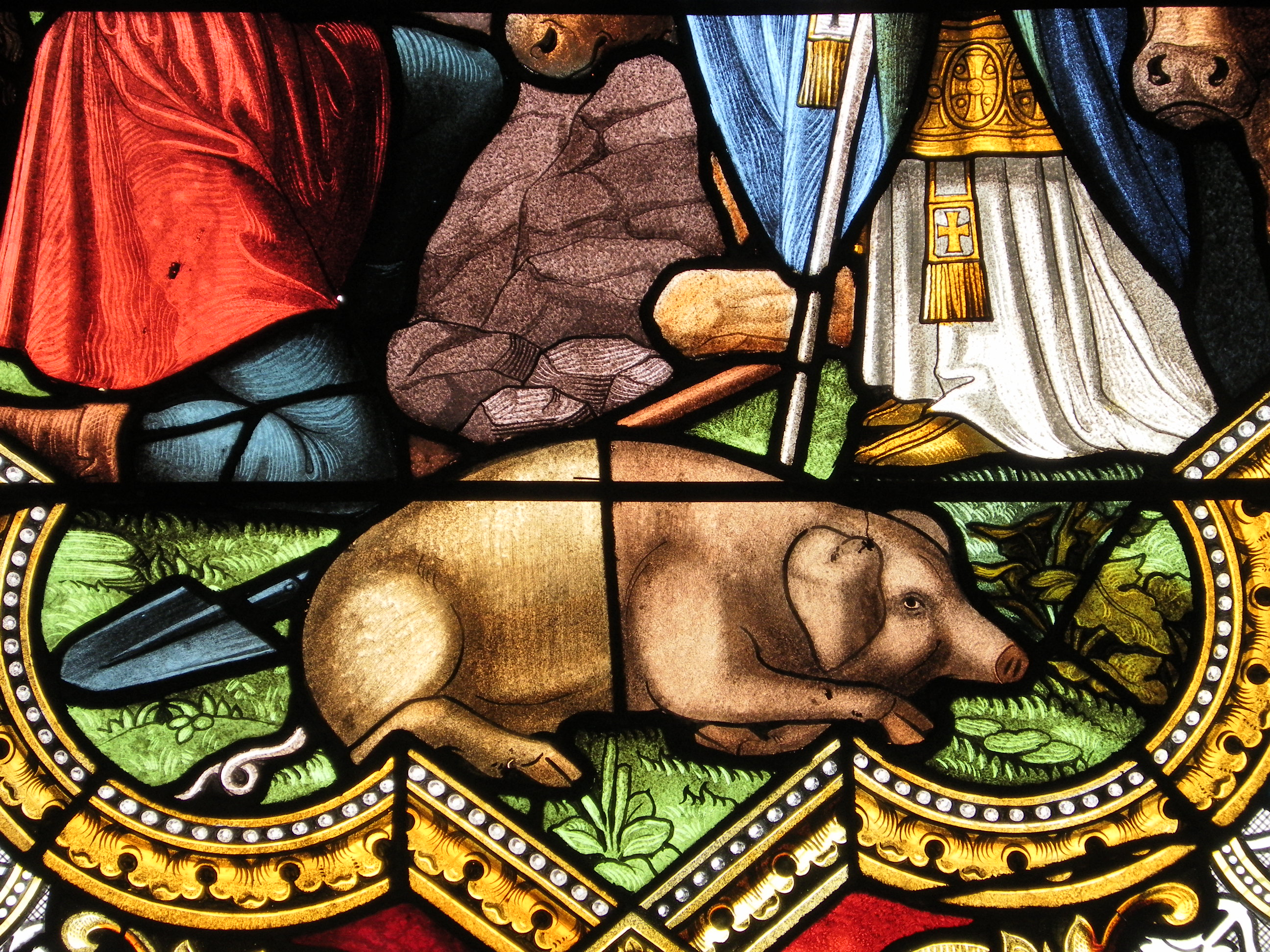
Pig at the feet of St Anthony the Hermit. Stained glass, Chapelle Notre-Dame-de-Lhor, Moselle, France

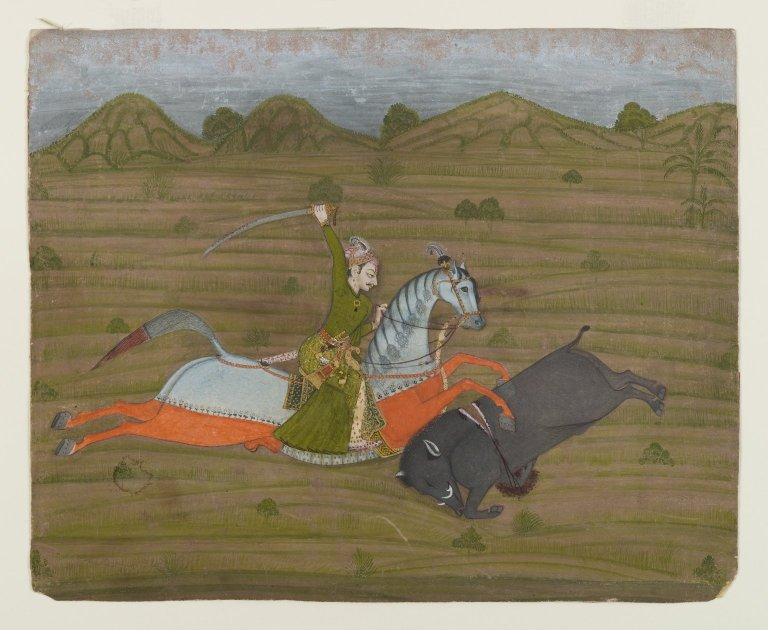
Prince Hunting Wild Boar. Gouache and gold on paper. India, c. 1765

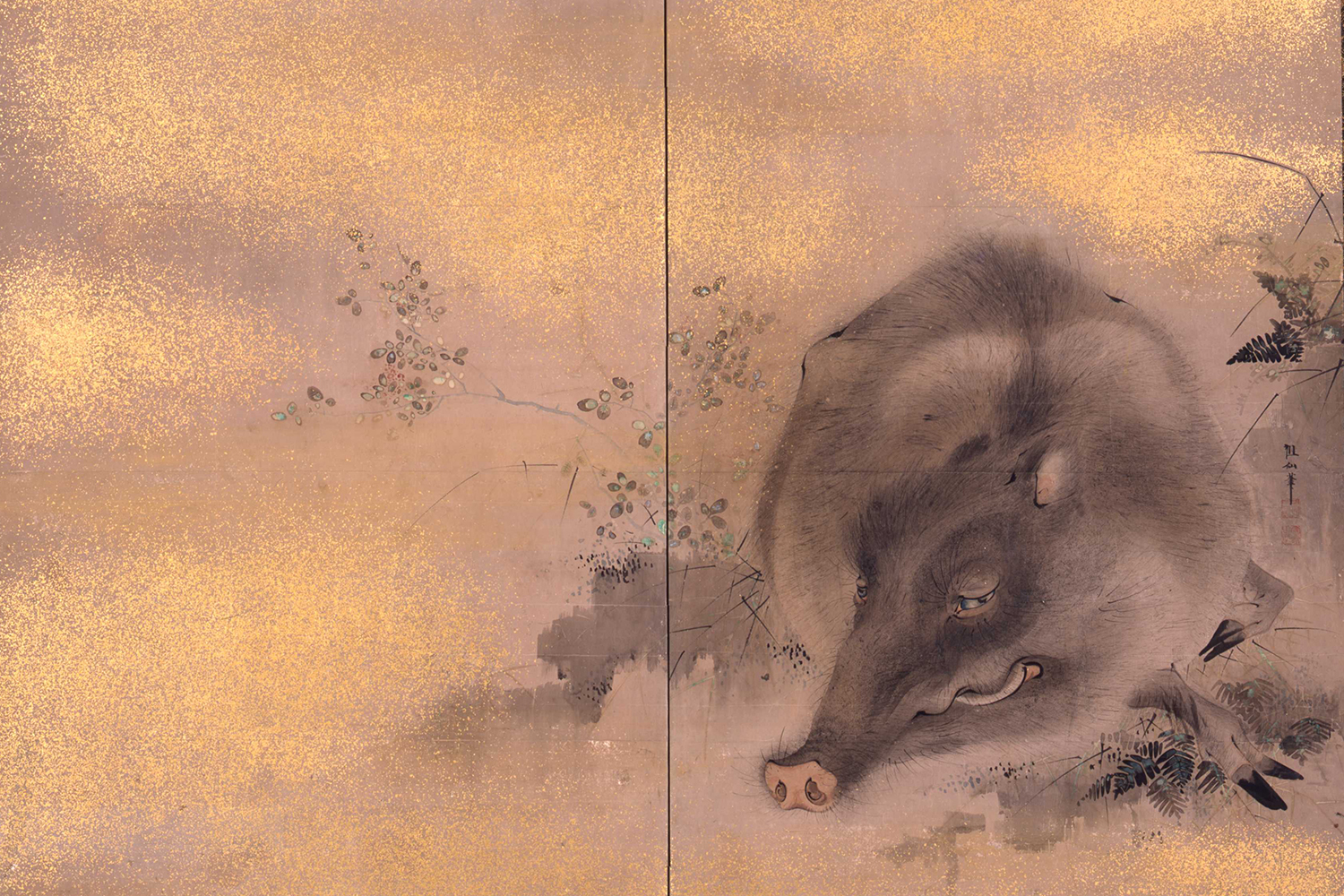
Folding screens of Inoshishi-zu by Mori Sosen. Edo period, Japan, 18th-19th century

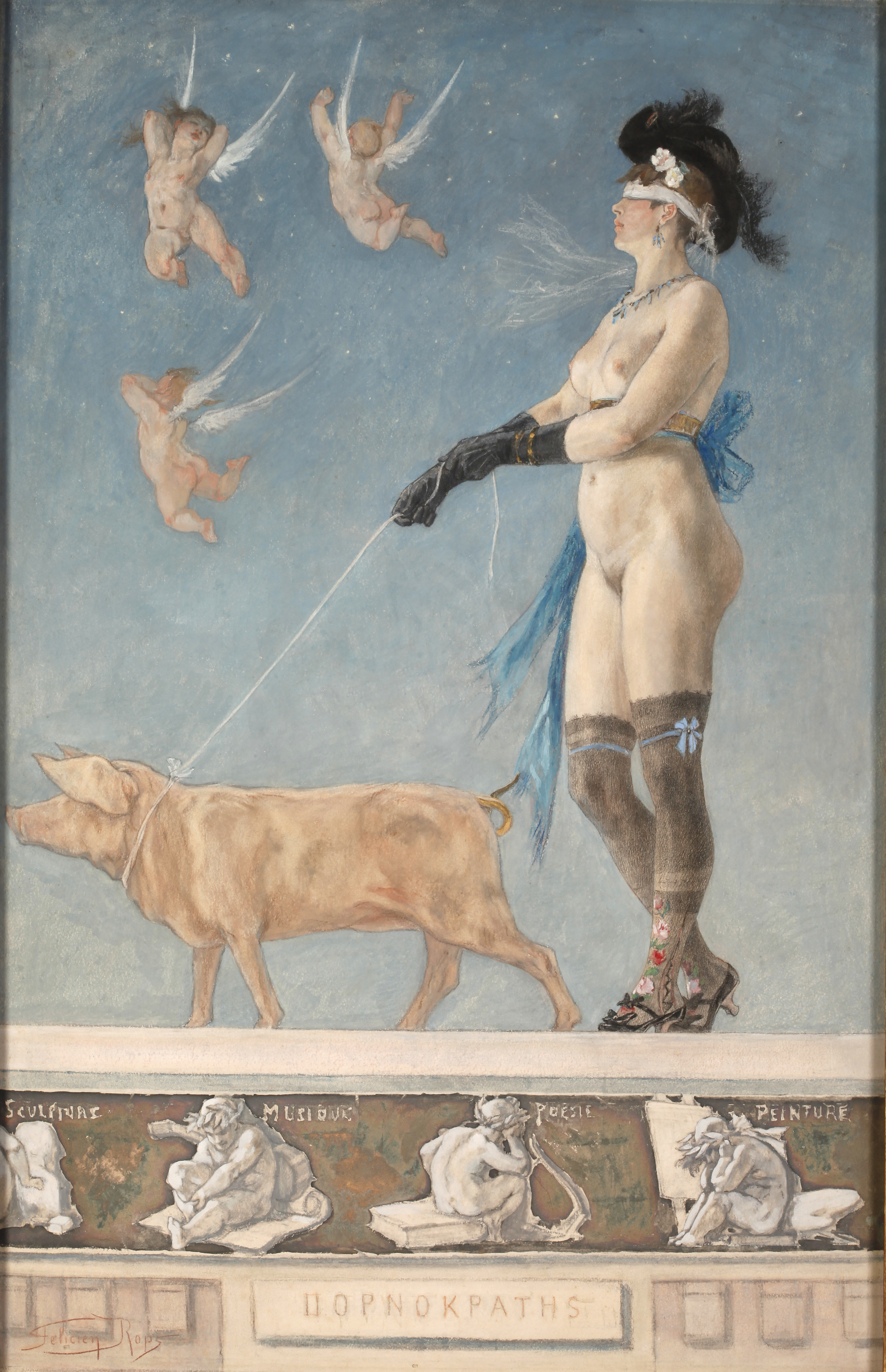
Pornokratès by Félicien Rops. Watercolour, pastel, and gouache, 1878

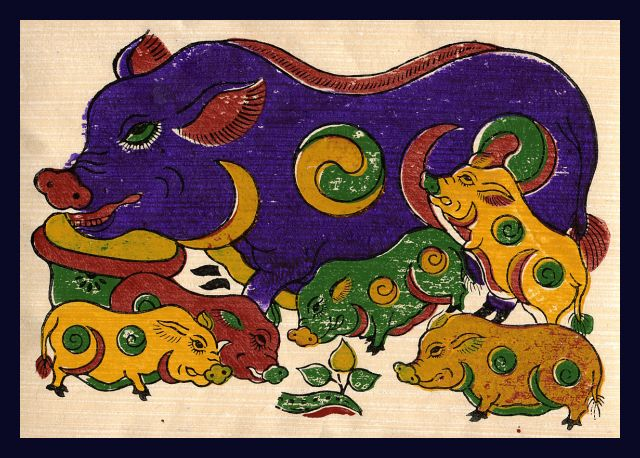
Lợn âm dương – Vietnamese Đông Hồ painting (19th - 20th centuries)

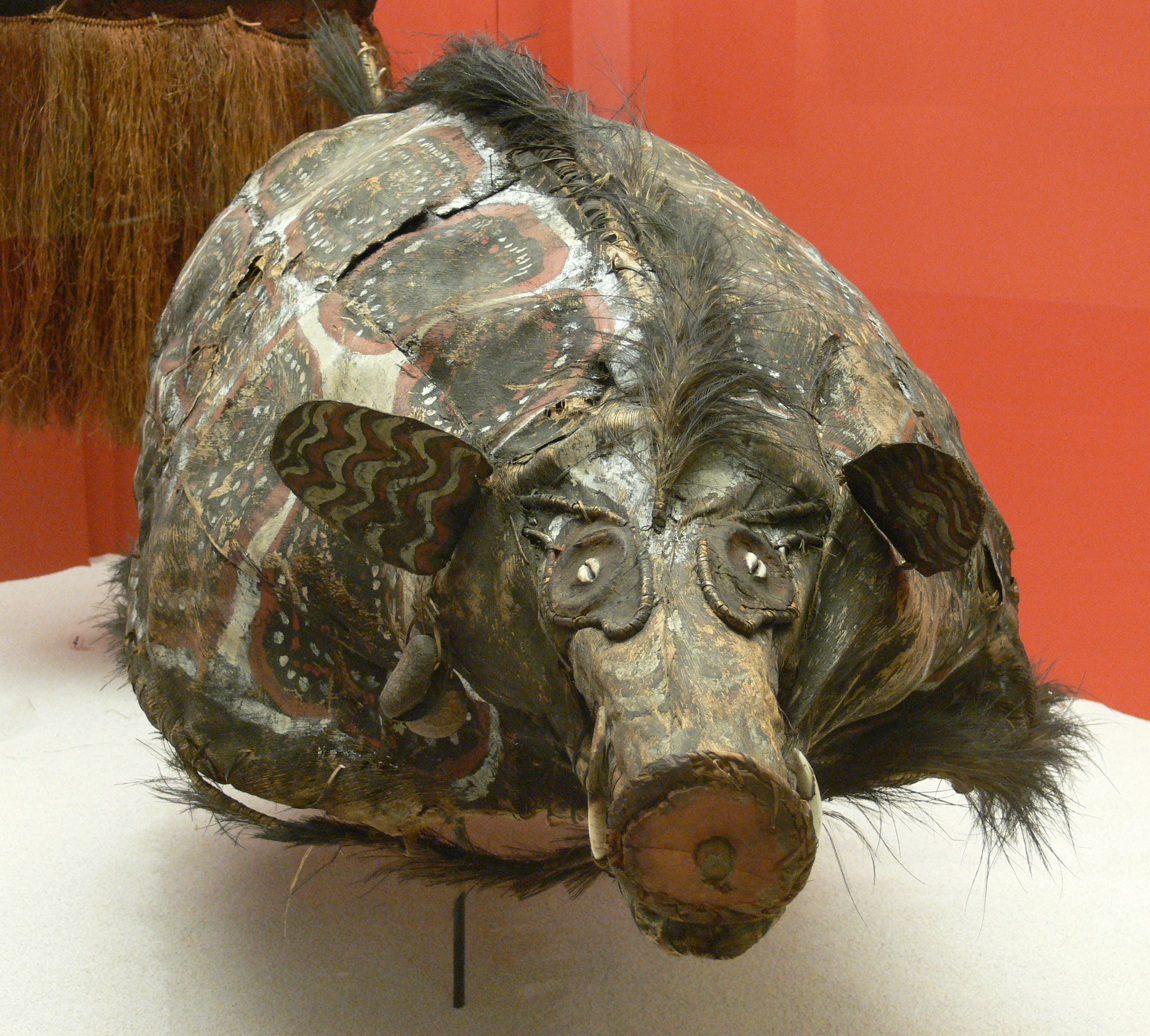
Ritual pig mask, Sepik region, Papua New Guinea. Rattan, palm leaf sheaths, and cassowary feathers. Collected 1914

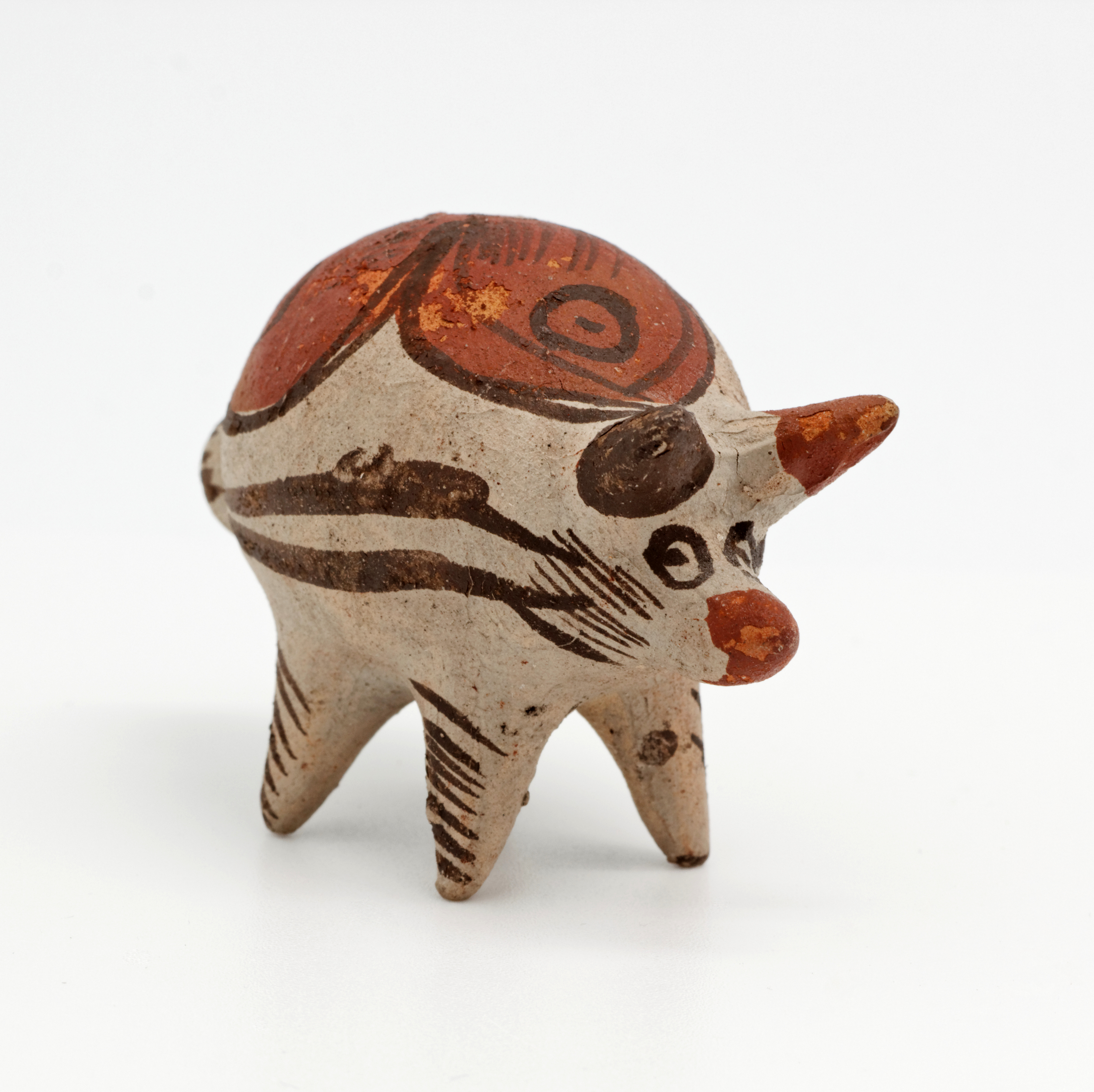
Amulet in shape of a pig. Pottery, Mexico

== Religion ==
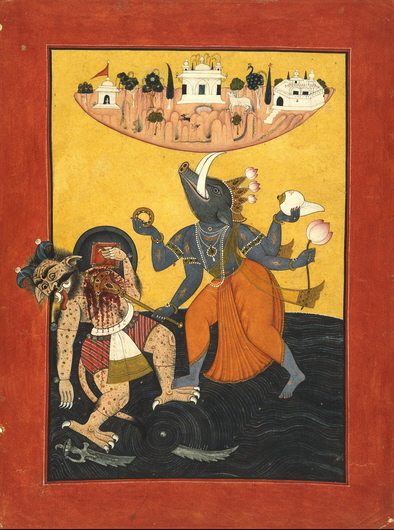
Varaha, the boar avatar of Vishnu, killing a demon. Gouache on paper, Chamba, c. 1740

Pig meat is unacceptable to some world religions. In Islam and Judaism the consumption of pork is forbidden. Many Hindus are lacto-vegetarian, avoiding all kinds of meat. In Buddhism, the pig symbolises delusion (Sanskrit: moha), one of the three poisons (Sanskrit: triviṣa). As with Hindus, many Buddhists are vegetarian, and some sutras of the Buddha state that meat should not be eaten; monks in the Mahayana traditions are forbidden to eat meat of any kind.

In contrast, in some religions pigs are sacred. The Druids of Ireland, for instance, call their priests "swine". One of the animals sacred to the Roman goddess Diana was the boar; she sent the Calydonian boar to destroy the land. In Hinduism, the boar-headed Varaha is venerated as an avatar of the god Vishnu. The sow was sacred to the Egyptian goddess Isis and used in sacrifice to Osiris.

== Places ==
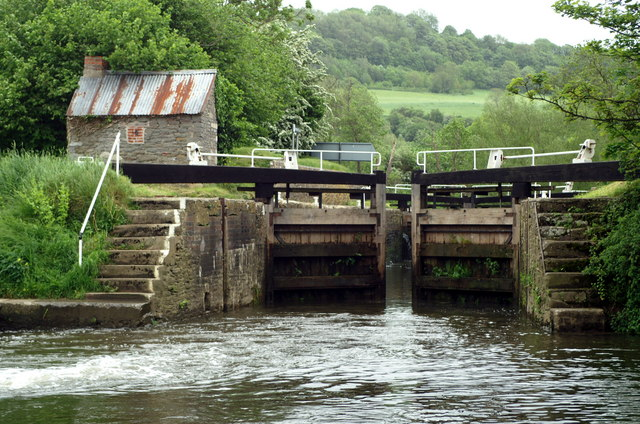
Swineford Lock is named for a ford where pigs used to cross the river Avon.

Many places are named for pigs. In England such placenames include Grizedale ("Pig valley", from Old Scandinavian griss, young pig, and dalr, valley), Swilland ("Pig land", from Old English swin and land), Swindon ("Pig hill"), and Swineford ("Pig ford"). In Scandinavia there are names such as Svinbergen ("Pig hill"), Svindal ("Pig valley"), Svingrund ("Pig ground"), Svinhagen ("Pig hedge"), Svinkärr ("Pig marsh"), Svinvik ("Pig bay"), Svinholm ("Pig islet"), Svinskär ("Pig skerry"), Svintorget ("Pig market"), and Svinö ("Pig island").

== Idiom ==
English language idioms related to pigs often have negative connotations of dirt, greed, or the monopolisation of resources, as in "road hog" or "server hog". As the scholar Richard Horwitz puts it, people all over the world have made pigs stand for "extremes of human joy or fear, celebration, ridicule, and repulsion". Pig names are used as epithets for negative human attributes, especially greed, gluttony, and uncleanliness. These ascribed attributes often lead to critical comparisons between pigs and humans. "Pig" is a slang term for a police officer or a male chauvinist, the latter term adopted in the women's liberation movement in the 1960s.

== Piggy bank ==
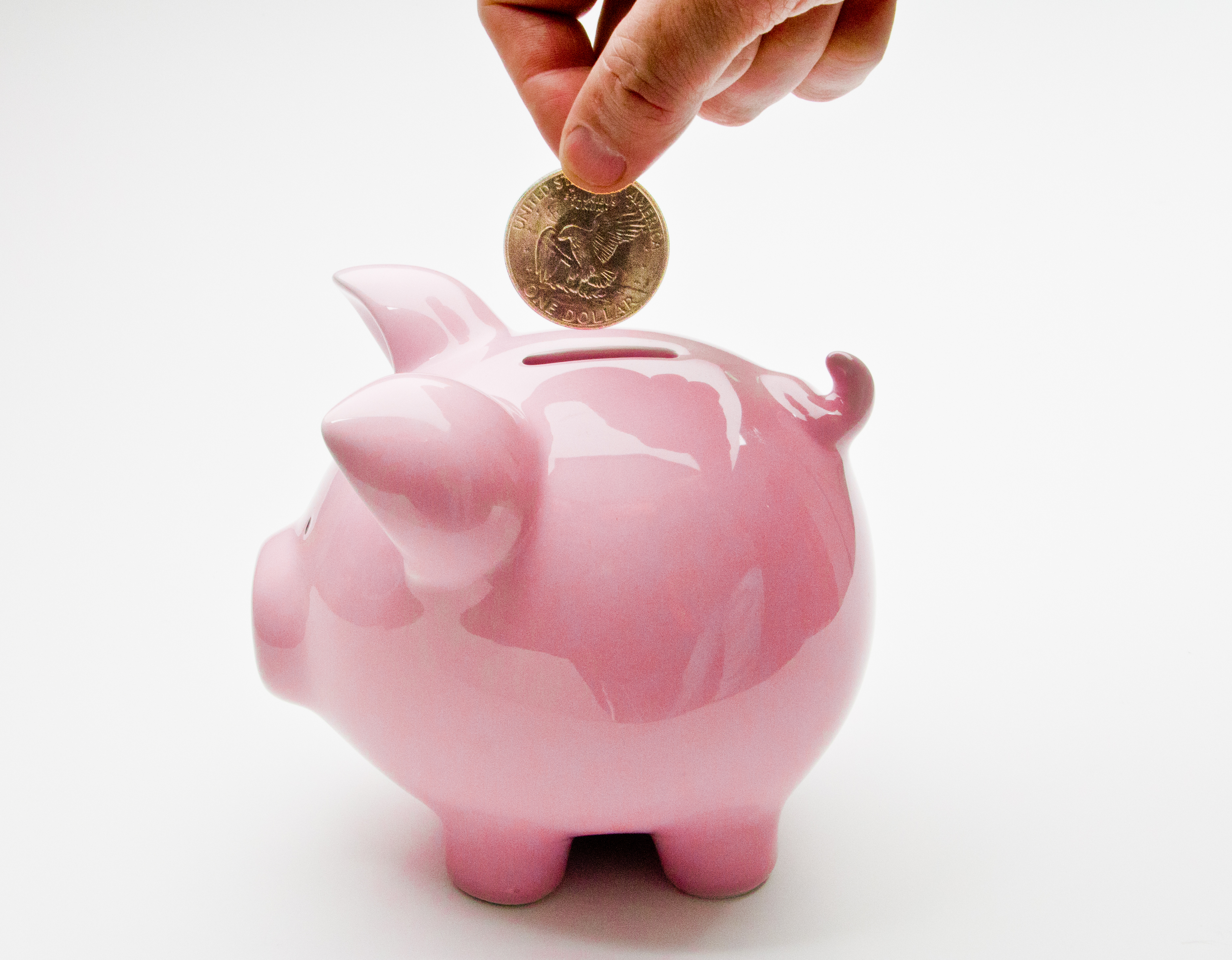
A piggy bank

Piggy banks are pig-shaped containers for saving small change. One early example is from 12th century Java, Indonesia another from the 13th century in Thuringia, Germany.

== See also ==
- List of fictional pigs
- Pigs in the City
