= David Poisson =

David Poisson is the name of:

- David Poisson (politician) (born 1951), American politician
- David Poisson (alpine skier) (1982–2017), French alpine skier

== See also ==
- Poisson (disambiguation)
