= Paul Poisson =

Paul Poisson may refer to:

- Paul Poisson (actor), French actor
- Paul Poisson (politician) (1887–1982), Canadian politician
