= Animal stereotype =

Animal stereotype may refer to:

- Stereotypy (non-human), repetitive behaviours of animals; the term has two meanings:
  - repetitive "abnormal" behaviours due to abnormal conditions with no obvious function
  - repetitive normal behaviours due to physiological or anatomical constraints
- Animal epithet, an epithet that compares a human to an animal basing on an animal trait thought as typical to this type of animal
- Anthropomorphism, ascribing a particular category of animals of human traits, emotions, or intentions.
