= Animal epithet =

Name for a person or group, by association with some perceived quality of an animal

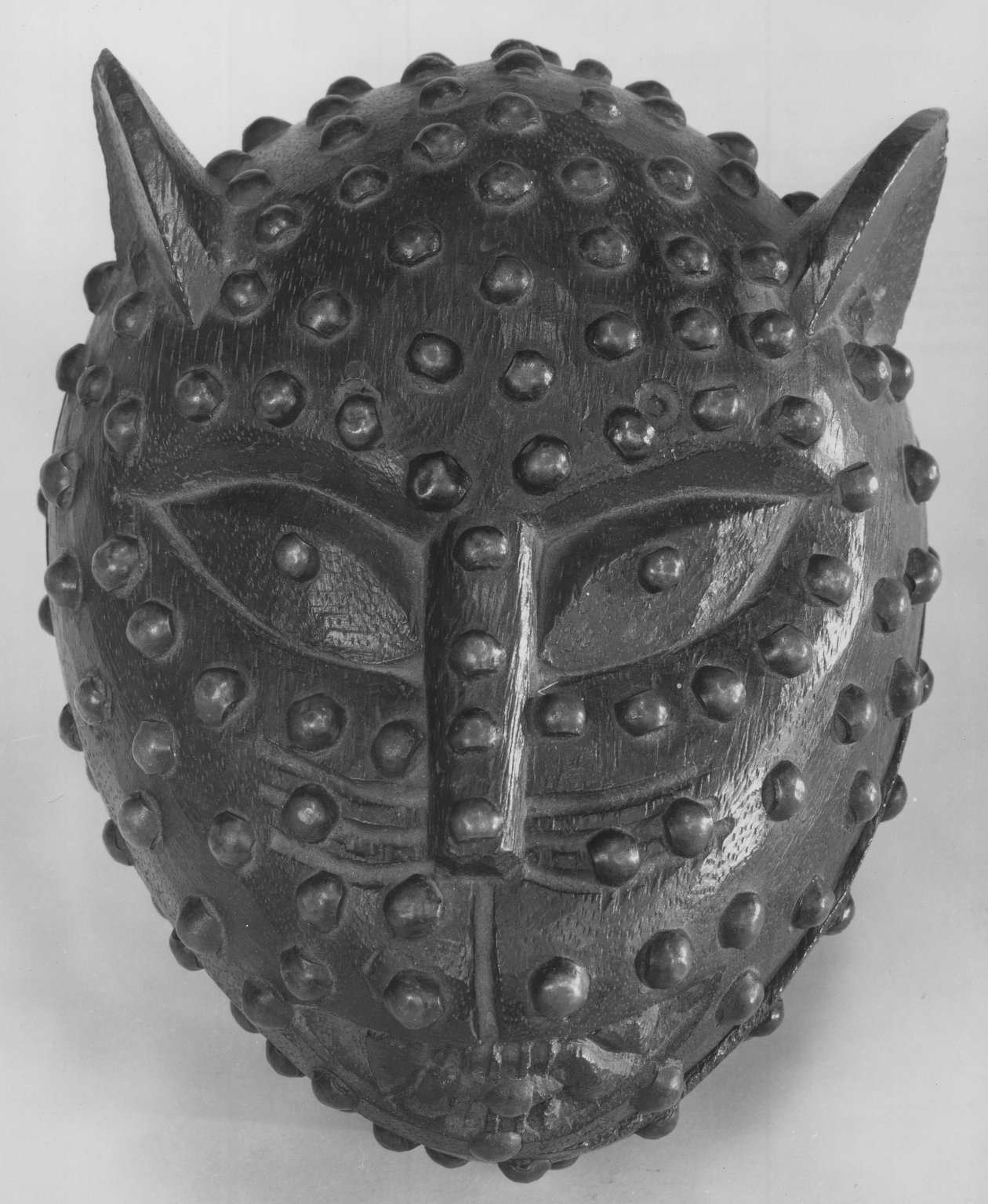
Leopard's Head box, 19th century. Wood with metal tags, used to hold kola nuts in the royal court of Benin, where leopard was an epithet for a powerful person.

An animal epithet is a name used to label a person or group, by association with some perceived quality of an animal. Epithets may be formulated as similes, explicitly comparing people with the named animal, as in "he is as sly as a fox", or as metaphors, directly naming people as animals, as in "he is a [sly] fox". Animal epithets may be pejorative, of negative character, or positive, indicating praise.

Animal similes and metaphors have been used since classical times, for example by Homer and Virgil, to heighten effects in literature, and to sum up complex concepts concisely.

Surnames that name animals are found in different countries. They may be metonymic, naming a person's profession, generally in the Middle Ages; toponymic, naming the place where a person lived; or nicknames, comparing the person favourably or otherwise with the named animal.

== History ==
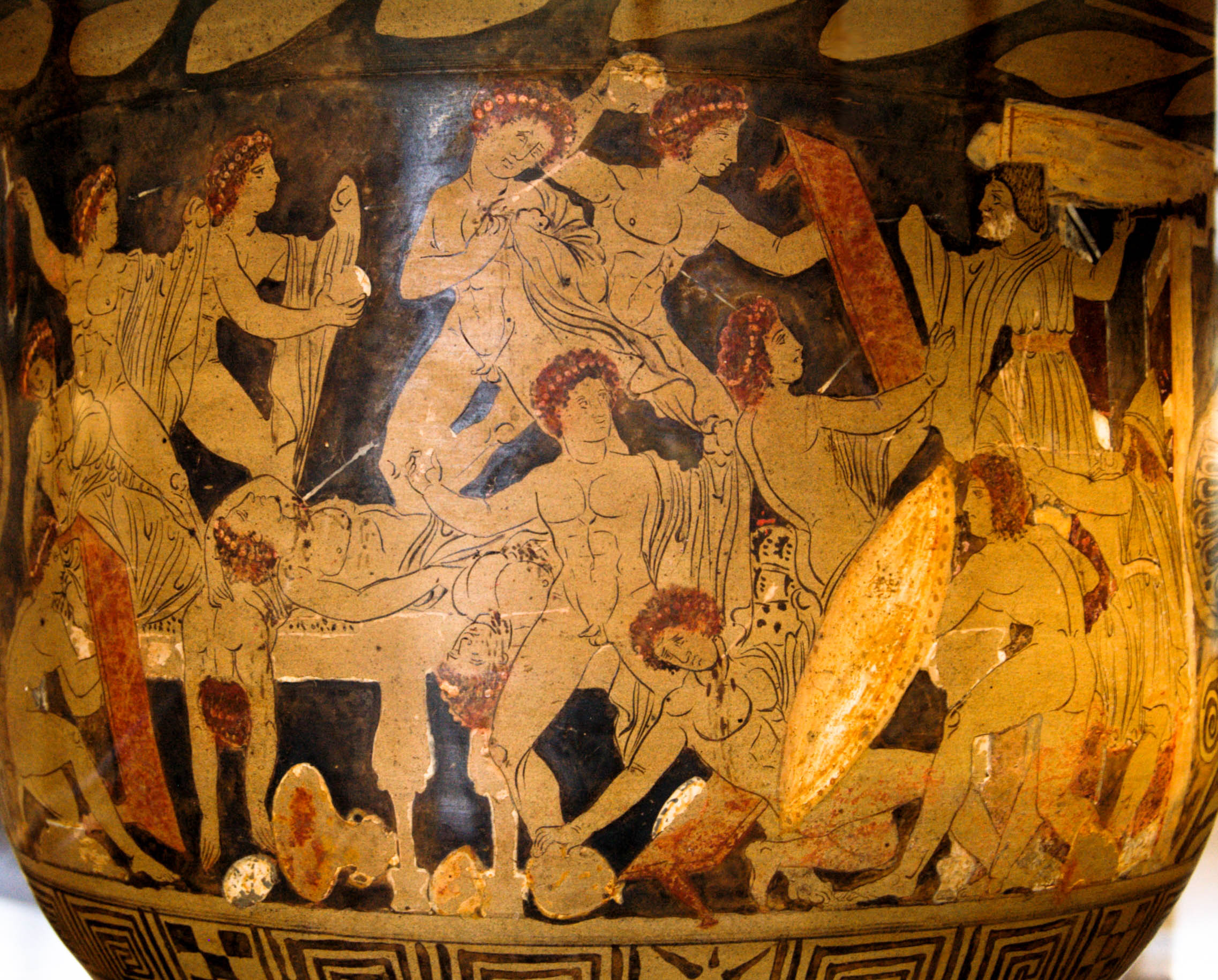
Odysseus, slaughtering Penelope's suitors on his return home at the end of the Odyssey, is compared by Homer to a lion. Bell-krater, c. 330 BC

In the cultures of ancient Greece and ancient Rome, animal stereotypes grew until by the time of Virgil, animal epithets could be applied to anything from an abstract concept like love or fear, to a whole civilisation. An author could use an animal's name to emphasise a theme or to provide an overview of a complex epic tale. For example, Homer uses animal similes in the Iliad and the Odyssey, where the lion symbolises qualities such as bravery. This leads up to the lion simile at the end of the Odyssey, where in Book 22 Odysseus kills all Penelope's suitors. In the Iliad, Homer compares the Trojans to stridulating grasshoppers, which the classicist Gordon Lindsay Campbell believes to imply that they make a lot of noise but are weaker and less determined than they think. In the Aeneid, Book 4, Virgil compares the world of Dido, queen of Carthage, with a colony of ants. Campbell argues that Dido's people are hardworking, strong, unfailingly loyal, organised, and self-regulating: just the sort of world that the hero Aeneas would like to create. But, Campbell argues, the simile also suggests that Carthage's civilisation is fragile and insignificant, and could readily be destroyed.

== Insults ==
=== Pejorative, politics ===
Animal epithets may be pejorative, indeed in some cultures highly offensive. Epithets are sometimes used in political campaigns; in 1890, the trades unionist Chummy Fleming marched with a group of unemployed people through the streets of Melbourne, displaying a banner with the message "Feed on our flesh and blood you capitalist hyenas: it is your funeral feast". On the other side of the ideological divide, the Cuban government described the revolutionary Che Guevara as a "communist rat" in 1958. Epithets are not limited to mammals; for instance, comparing someone to a snail means they are (extremely) slow, while calling them a slug implies they are lazy and loathsome. Frog is pejorative for French people in English, from the use of frogs' legs in French cuisine.

=== Taboos ===
Edmund Leach argued in a classic 1964 paper that animal epithets are insulting when the animal in question is taboo, making its name suitable for use as an obscenity. For example, Leach argues that calling a person "a son of a bitch" or "you swine" means that the "animal name itself is credited with potency".

In 1976, John Halverson argued that Leach's argument about taboos was "specious", and his "categorisation of animals in terms of 'social distance' and edibility is inconsistent in itself and corresponds neither to reality nor to the scheme of social distance and human sexuality it is claimed to parallel". Halverson disputed the association of animal epithets with potency, noting that calling a timid person a mouse, or a person who does not face reality an ostrich, or a silly person a goose, does not mean that these names are potent, taboo, or sacred.

Timothy Jay argues, citing Leach, that the use of animal epithets as insults is partly down to taboos on eating pets or unfamiliar wild animals, and partly down to our stereotypes of animals' habits, such as that pigs in popular culture "are dirty, fat, and eat filth". Jay further cites Sigmund Freud's view that obscenities that name animals, such as cow, cock, dog, pig, and bitch, gain their power by reducing people to animals.

== Metaphors and similes ==
The use of metaphors from zoology, such as referring to politicians as rats or hyenas, is what the linguistic researcher Aida Sakalauskaite calls "zoometaphors" and Grzegorz A. Kleparski calls "zoosemy", the use of metaphors from zoology. In each of three different languages, English, German, and Lithuanian, the most common animal categories are farmyard animals (40% in English), dog family (including dog and wolf, 6% in English), and birds (10% in English). Grammatically, metaphor, as in "sly fox", is not the only option: speakers may also use simile, as in "deaf as an ass". In German, 92% of animal epithets are metaphors, 8% similes, whereas in English, 53% are similes, 47% metaphors.

Frequencies of English animal epithets
Animal Group	Group frequency	Simile relative frequency	Simile examples	Metaphor relative frequency	Metaphor examples
Dogs	13%	49%	as hungry as a wolf; as friendly as a puppy	51%	dog-tired; sly fox; vixen; bitch; dog; lone wolf
Birds	13%	35%	as black as a raven; to jabber like a bunch of blackbirds	65%	to parrot; cuckoo; aquiline; to swan about; bird-brained; the vultures are circling; (warmaking) hawk versus (peacemaking) dove
Insects	7%	81%	as busy as a bee; to sting like a hornet	19%	louse; cockroach; (inconstant) butterfly; (unfaithful [hopping from one partner to another]) grasshopper
Farmyard animals	41%	54%	as strong as an ox; to follow like a sheep; stubborn as a mule; gentle as a lamb; happy as a pig in muck	46%	to horse around; greedy pig; silly ass; a turkey (that will never fly); bovine; sheepish; mutton dressed as lamb
Other animals	7%	50%	as slow as a snail; gruff as a bear	50%	to ape; snake in the grass; speak with a forked tongue; snake; (adaptable) chameleon; worm
Aquatic animals	6%	57%	flipping like a flounder; to swim like a fish	43%	fishy; in shoals; (ugly) toad; (small) shrimp
Cats	8%	40%	as brave as a lion	60%	catty
Glires (rodents and lagomorphs)	5%	62%	mad as a (March) hare; to breed like a rabbit; happy as a mouse in cheese	38%	frightened rabbit; squirrel/to squirrel away

The Hungarian linguists Katalin Balogné Bérces and Zsuzsa Szamosfalvi found in a preliminary survey of Serbian usage that the most commonly used "animal vocatives" were, in order, 1. pig, 2. chick(en), 3. dog/puppy, 4. cow, 5. monkey, 6. hen, 7. rat, 8. turkey, 9. mouse, 10. snake, 11. cat/kitten, 12. fox, 13. lamb, 14. vixen, 15. worm. Of these, using the classification devised by Sabina Halupka-Resetar, and Biljana Radic, lamb was always used positively; cow and vixen referred to a person's appearance; pig indicated a person's eating habits; calling someone a fox or a turkey related to their intelligence, or lack of it; and names like cat, snake, worm, monkey, dog, mouse, chicken, lamb and rat were used to indicate a person's character.

== Surnames ==
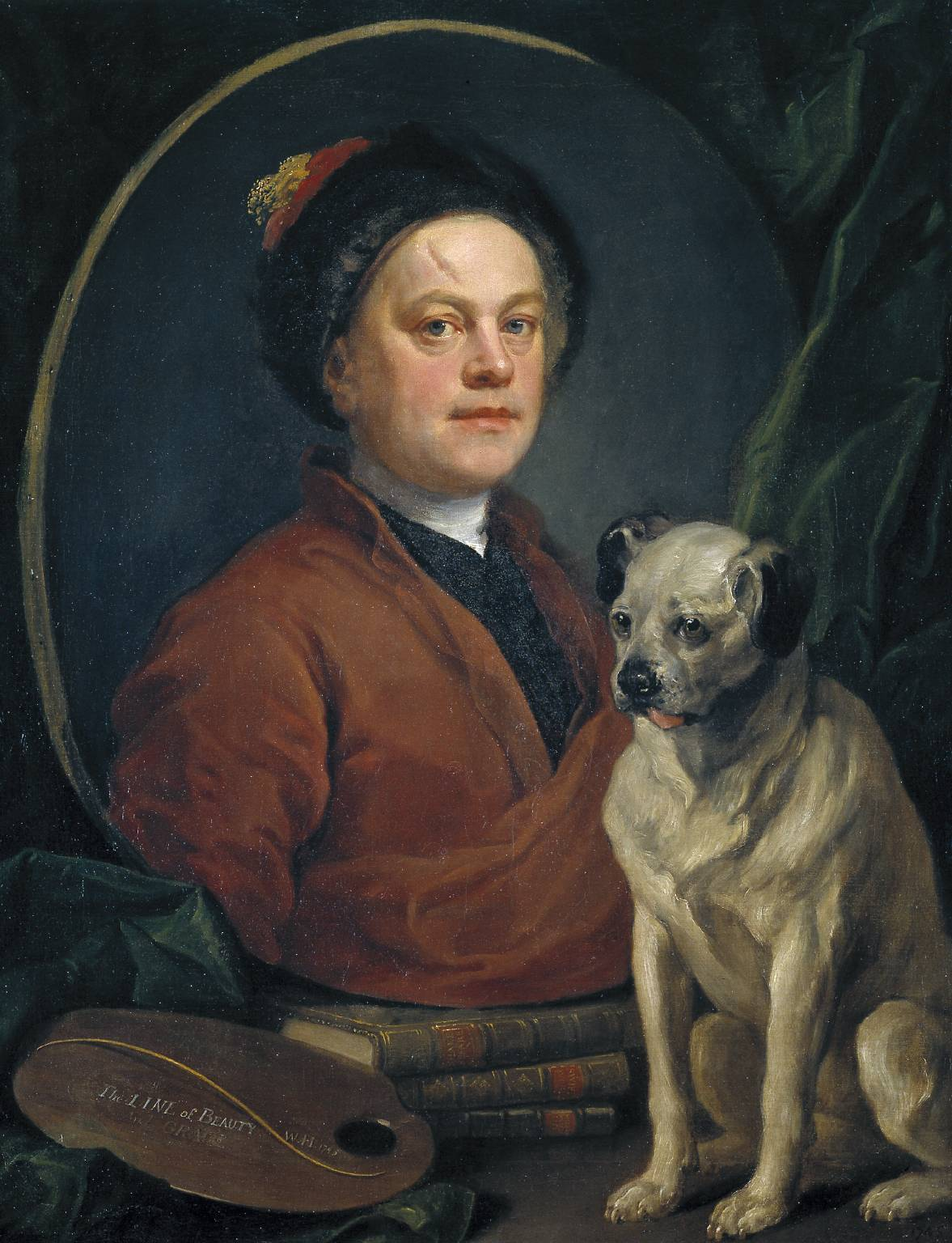
The painter William Hogarth's name is a metonym for a swineherd. Self-portrait with his dog, 1745

Some English surnames from the Middle Ages name animals. These have different origins. Some, like Pigg (1066), Hogg (1079) and Hoggard, Hogarth (1279) are metonyms for a swineherd, while Oxer (1327) similarly denotes an oxherd and Shepherd (1279 onwards; also Shepard, Sheppard, etc.) means as it sounds a herder of sheep.

Surnames that mention animals can also be toponymic, the names Horscroft, Horsfall, Horsley and Horstead for example all denoting people who came from these villages associated with horses. The surname Horseman (1226 onwards) on the other hand is a metonym for a rider, mounted warrior, or horse-dealer, while the surnames Horse and Horsnail could either be nicknames or metonyms for workers with horses and shoers of horses respectively.

Some surnames, like Bird, dating from 1193 onwards, with variants like Byrd and Bride, are most likely nicknames for a birdlike person, though they may also be metonyms for a birdcatcher; but Birdwood is toponymic, for a person who lived by a wood full of birds. Eagle from 1230 is a nickname from the bird, while Weasel, Wessel from 1193 and Stagg from 1198 are certainly nicknames from those animals. It is not always easy to tell whether a nickname was friendly, humorous or negative, but the surname Stallion, with variants Stallan, Stallen and Stallon, (1202 onwards) is certainly pejorative, meaning "a begetter, a man of lascivious life".

Surnames behave in similar ways in other languages; for example in France, surnames can be toponymic, metonymic, or may record nicknames ("sobriquets"). Poisson (meaning fish) is a metonym for a fishmonger or fisherman. Loiseau (The bird) and Lechat (The cat) are nicknames, Lechat indicating either a flexible man or a hypocrite, Loiseau suggesting a lightly-built birdlike person. In Sweden, the surname Falk (Falcon) is common; it is found among Swedish nobility from 1399.

== See also ==
- Plant epithet

== Sources ==
- Reaney, P. H.; Wilson, R. M. (1997). A Dictionary of English Surnames. Oxford University Press. ISBN 0-198-60092-5.
