= Philippe Poisson (actor) =

French actor (1682-1743)

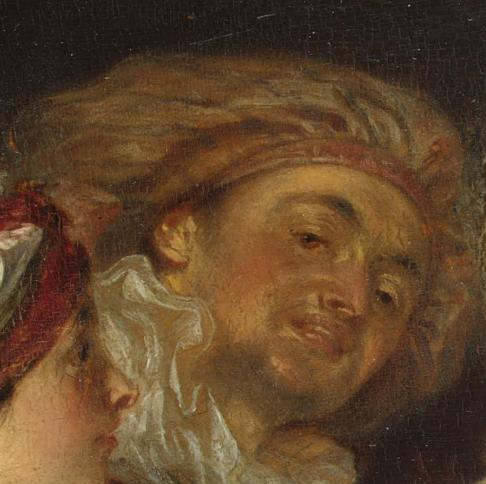
- Antoine Watteau, detail of Actors of the Comédie-Française (The Coquettes), 1710s, believed to be a depiction of Poisson. Hermitage Museum, Saint Petersburg.
- Born: 8 February 1682; Paris, France
- Died: 4 August 1743 (aged 61); Saint-Germain-en-Laye, France
- Other name: Crispin III
- Occupations: Actor and playwright
- Years active: 1700 – 1722

Philippe Poisson (8 February 1682 – 4 August 1743), known professionally as Crispin III, was a French actor and playwright.

== Early life ==
He, as well as the actor François-Arnoul Poisson de Roinville and the novelist and playwright Madeleine-Angélique de Gomez were all children of the actor Paul Poisson.

== Career ==
Born in Paris, Philippe made his début in 1700 in a tragedy, playing secondary roles with some success and also appearing in high comedy. Retiring with his father in 1711, he returned to the stage in 1715 before leaving it for good in 1722.

Like those of his grandfather Raymond Poisson, his plays lack invention – their style is less trivial but still lacks elegance, though their dialogue is naturalistic. The two most notable ones are le Procureur arbitre (1728) and l’Impromptu de campagne (1733), whilst the others are la Boite de Pandore (1729), Alcibiade (1731), le Réveil d’Épiménide (1736), le Mariage par lettres de change (1735), les Ruses d’amour (1736) and l’Actrice nouvelle (a comedy, never performed after Adrienne Lecouvreur wrote a satire mocking it).

== Death ==
He died in Saint-Germain-en-Laye on 4 August 1743.

== Sources ==
- Hartnoll, Phyllis, ed. (1983). The Oxford Companion to the Theatre (4th ed.). Oxford et al.: Oxford University Press. p. 216. ISBN 0-19-211546-4 – via the Internet Archive.
- Lancaster, Henry Carrington (1945). Sunset: A History of Parisian Drama in the Last Years of Louis XIV, 1701–1715. Baltimore, MD: Johns Hopkins Press. OCLC 1151320593 – via the Internet Archive.
- Lancaster, Henry Carrington (1950). French Tragedy in the Time of Louis XV and Voltaire. Vol. 1. Baltimore, MD: Johns Hopkins Press. OCLC 1149199512 – via the Internet Archive.
- Lyonnet, Henry (1902–1908). Dictionnaire des comédiens français (in French). Vol. 2. Genève: Bibliotheque de la Revue universelle internationale illustrée. p. 539 – via Gallica.
- Vapereau, Gustave (1876). Dictionnaire universel des littératures. Paris: Hachette. p. 1621 – via the Internet Archive.
- Richtman, Jack (1971). Adrienne Lecouvreur: the Actress and the Age. New Jersey: Englewood Cliffs. ISBN 978-0-13-008698-3. OCLC 1023756226.
