= Poisson =

Poisson may refer to:

== People ==
- Siméon Denis Poisson, French mathematician
- Eric Poisson, Canadian physicist

== Places ==
- Poissons, a commune of Haute-Marne, France
- Poisson, Saône-et-Loire, a commune of Saône-et-Loire, France

== Other uses ==
- Poisson (surname), a French surname
- Poisson (crater), a lunar crater named after Siméon Denis Poisson
- The French word for fish

== See also ==
- Adolphe-Poisson Bay, a body of water located to the southwest of Gouin Reservoir, in La Tuque, Mauricie, Quebec
- Poisson distribution, a discrete probability distribution named after Siméon Denis Poisson
- Poisson's equation, a partial differential equation named after Siméon Denis Poisson
- List of things named after Siméon Denis Poisson
- Poison (disambiguation)
