= Poison (disambiguation) =

Poison is a substance that causes injury, illness, or death.

Poison or The Poison may also refer to:

== Fictional characters ==
- Poison (comics), a Marvel Comics heroine with toxic, poisonous abilities
- Doctor Poison, two DC Comics villains
- Poison (Final Fight), a character in the Final Fight and Street Fighter video-game series

== Film and television ==
- Poison (1991 film), a 1991 film directed by Todd Haynes
- Poison (2024 film), a 2024 film starring Tim Roth and Trine Dyrholm
- Poison (TV series), 2019 Indian web series
  - Poison 2, its 2020 sequel
- Poisons or the World History of Poisoning, a 2001 Russian film directed by Karen Shakhnazarov
- "Poison" (House), a 2005 episode of House
- "Poison" (Law & Order: Criminal Intent), an episode of Law & Order: Criminal Intent

== Literature ==
- "Poison" (story), by Roald Dahl
- Poison (Kielland novel), by Alexander Kielland
- Poison (Wooding novel), by Chris Wooding

== Music ==
=== Bands ===
- Poison (band), an American glam metal band

=== Albums and EPs ===
- Poison (Chamillionaire album), unreleased
- Poison (Rebecca album), 1987
- Poison (Bell Biv DeVoe album), 1990
- Poison (Groove Coverage EP), 2004
- The Poison, an album by Bullet for My Valentine, 2005
- Poison (Secret EP), 2012
- Poison (Swizz Beatz album), 2018

=== Songs ===
- "Poison" (Kool G Rap & DJ Polo song), 1988
- "Poison" (Alice Cooper song), 1989
- "Poison" (Bell Biv DeVoe song), 1990
- "Poison" (The Prodigy song), 1995
- "Poison" (Bardot song), 2000
- "Poison" (Beyoncé song), 2008
- "Poison" (Nicole Scherzinger song), 2010
- "Poison" (Secret song), 2012
- "Poison" (Rita Ora song), 2015
- "Poison" (Martin Garrix song), 2015
- "Poison" (Aaliyah song), 2021
- "Poison", by Glaive from his 2021 EP All Dogs Go To Heaven
- "Poison" (Hazbin Hotel song), 2024
- "Poison", a song by Kira Kosarin
- "Poison", by Motörhead from Bomber, 1979
- "Poison", by Lisa Stansfield from her debut album Affection, 1989
- "Poison", by Uhm Jung-hwa from Invitation, 1998
- "Poison: Iitai Koto mo Ienai Konna Yo no Naka wa", by Takashi Sorimachi from High Life, 1998
- "Poison", by Hot Water Music from The New What Next, 2004
- "The Poison", by Pedro the Lion from Achilles Heel, 2004
- "The Poison", by Alkaline Trio from Crimson, 2005
- "Poison", by Elise Estrada from Elise Estrada, 2008
- "Poison", by Martina Topley-Bird from The Blue God, 2008
- "Poison", by All Time Low from Nothing Personal, 2009
- "The Poison", by The All-American Rejects from Almost Alice: Music Inspired by the Motion Picture, 2010
- "Poison", by Asking Alexandria from From Death to Destiny, 2013
- "Poison", by Namie Amuro from Feel, 2013
- "Poison", by Waxahatchee from Ivy Tripp, 2015
- "Poison", by Brent Faiyaz from A.M. Paradox, 2016
- "Poison", by Loïc Nottet for his debut studio album Selfocracy, 2017
- "Poison", by The Browning from OMNI, 2024

=== Other ===
- The Poison: Live at Brixton, a DVD by Bullet For My Valentine

== Other uses ==
- Data poisoning, maliciously introducing erroneous data into a machine learning dataset
- Nuclear poison, a neutron-absorbent material that impedes an intended nuclear reaction
- Poison (perfume), by Christian Dior
- Poison (game), a children's game

== See also ==
- Poisson (disambiguation)
