= François-Arnoul Poisson de Roinville =

French actor

François-Arnoul Poisson de Roinville (15 March 1696 - 24 August 1753) was a French actor.

He, Philippe Poisson and Madeleine-Angélique de Gomez were all children of the actor Paul Poisson, who tried to stop François-Arnoul becoming an actor. Born in Paris, he made his debut as Sosie in Amphitryon on 21 May 1722. He was admitted to the company in 1725, equalling his father in Crispin and surpassing him in the rest of the répertoire. He played Monsieur de Pourceaugnac in le Bourgeois gentilhomme and Lafleur in le Glorieux, the marquis dans la Mère coquette, Bernadille in la Femme juge et partie as well as roles in Turcaret.
