= Albert Poisson =

Writer

Albert Poisson (1868–1893), was a Romantic author, particularly interested in alchemy Cabalista y Rosacruz. In 1891, at the age of 22, he published what would become his most famous book: Théories et symboles des alchimistes (The theories and symbols of alchemy), which saw several editions. He died in 1893, aged 24, due to pulmonary tuberculosis.

== Works ==
- Théories et symboles des alchimistes Chacornac, 1891.
- L'initiation alchimique (13 lettres inédites sur la pratique du Grand Œuvre), Paris, Édition de l'Initiation, 1900.
- Nicolas Flamel, Histoire de l'Alchimie, Paris, Gutenberg reprint, 1981.
- Le livre des feux, paru dans la Revue Scientifique, n° 15, avril 1891.
- Cinq traités d'alchimie des plus grands philosophes: Paracelse, Albert le Grand, Roger Bacon, R. Lulle, Arn. de Villeneuve, bibliothèque Chacornac, 1890.
