= Epicuri de grege porcum =

Latin phrase meaning "A pig from the herd of Epicurus"

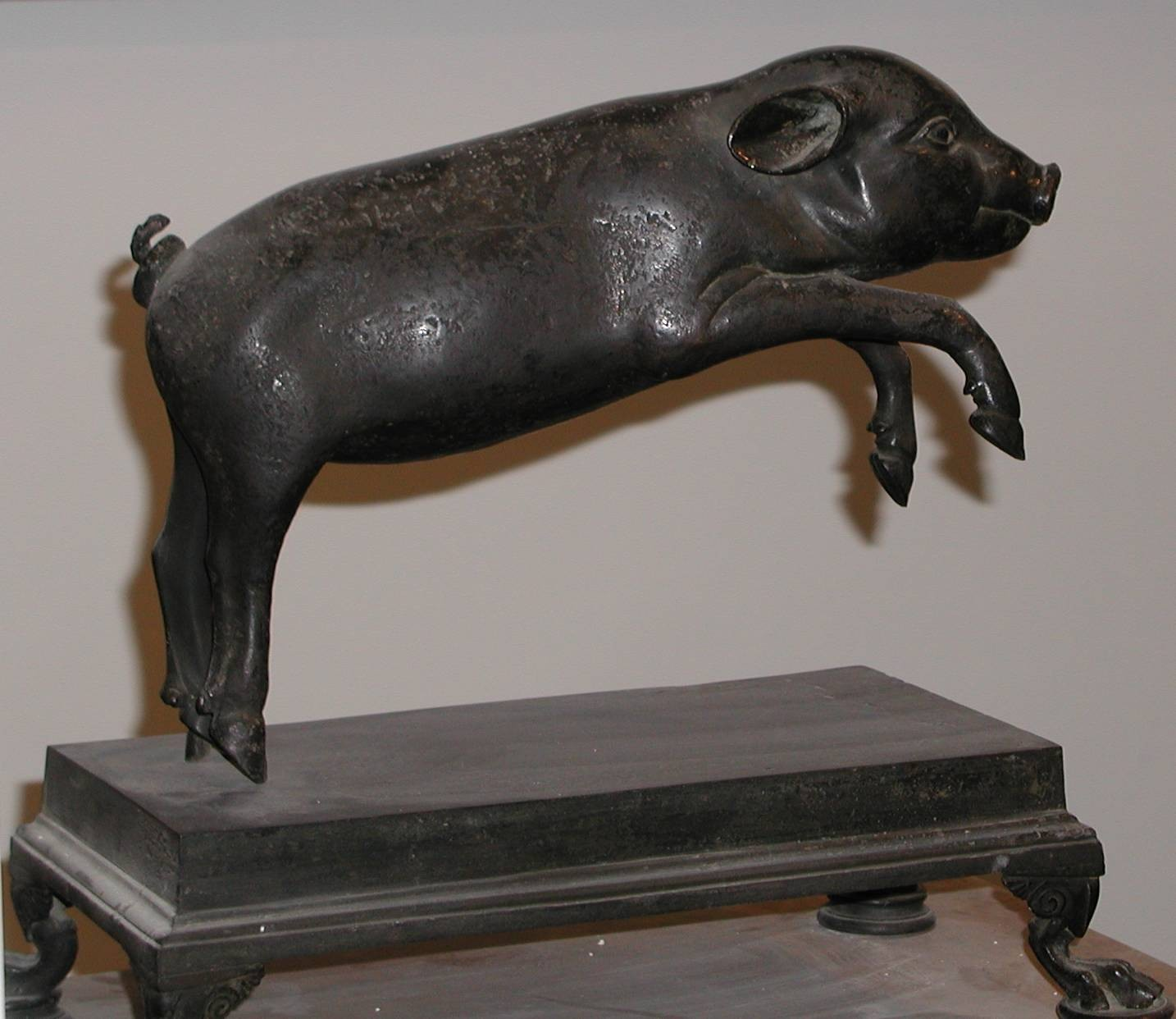
A bronze statue of a pig in the Villa of the Papyri, the centre of a circle of Epicureans led by Philodemus of Gadara.

The Latin phrase Epicuri de grege porcum (literally, "A pig from the herd of Epicurus") was a phrase first used by the Roman poet Horace. The phrase appears in an epistle to Albius Tibullus, giving advice to the moody fellow poet:

Latin

inter spem curamque, timores inter et iras
omnem crede diem tibi diluxisse supremum:
grata superveniet quae non sperabitur hora.
me pinguem et nitidum bene curata cute vises
cum ridere voles, Epicuri de grege porcum.

English (Loeb Classics)

Amid hopes and cares, amid fears and passions,
believe that every day that has dawned is your last.
Welcome will come to you another hour unhoped for.
As for me, when you want a laugh, you will find me in fine fettle,
fat and sleek, a hog from Epicurus’s herd.

Epicurus was an Ancient Greek philosopher who taught that pleasure was the natural aim of man (as well as of all living things). From the beginning, Epicureans were keen to extol man's pleasure above that of the beasts. For Epicurus, man alone had the pleasures of friendship and philosophy; indeed, philosophy gave man the important ability to drive out empty or unnatural desires. The Epicurean philosopher Lucretius, in his De rerum natura, compared primitive men to "hairy boars" in their unhappiness. Only humans had the ability to cooperate and form societies which fostered pleasure. Philodemus of Gadara forcefully rebutted arguments that the animals, since they did not know of the Gods, were happier than humans (who fretted constantly of the Gods' existence). Animals, he alleged, had such anxieties but lacked the capacity of reason and therefore could not dispel them (as the Epicureans had succeeded at doing).

Nonetheless, the Epicurean philosophy lent itself to uncharitable comparisons to the basest of animals. Epicurus's contemporary Timon of Phlius labelled him the "most piggish, most doggish" philosopher. A silver cup of 30 AD uncovered at Boscoreale depicts Epicurus discoursing on pleasure as a greedy pig jumps up to steal food from the cooking pot. Plutarch's humorous dialogue Gryllus has Odysseus debate with one of his men whom Circe has turned into a pig. The pig convinces him that, immune to unnatural desires and free from false beliefs, his new species's virtue and happiness is much greater than that of Odysseus's.

Some Epicureans, like Horace, embraced this symbol. The pig was already a symbol of ataraxia (imperturbability) for the followers of Pyrrho, so did not have solely negative connotations. The Villa of the Papyri, the centre of a circle of Epicureans led by Philodemus, featured a large bronze statue of a pig on its hind legs.
