= Paul Poisson (actor) =

17th century French actor

Paul Poisson (1658 – 28 December 1735) was a French actor.

== Career ==
Born in Paris, he was the son of the actor Belleroche and succeeded his father in the role of 'Crispin' in 1686. He retired for the first time in 1711, returning in 1715 and retiring for good in 1724.

== Personal life ==
He married the actress Marie Angélique Gassot (1658–1756). Their two sons, Philippe and Francois-Arnoul, both became actors, whilst their daughter, Madeleine-Angélique de Gomez, became a writer.

== Death ==
He died at the hôtel de Gesvres, 23 rue Neuve-Saint-Augustin, Saint-Germain-en-Laye.

== Sources ==
- Gustave Vapereau (1876). "Poisson (Paul)", p. 1621, Dictionnaire universel des littératures. Paris: Hachette.
