= Madeleine-Angélique de Gomez =

French author and playwright

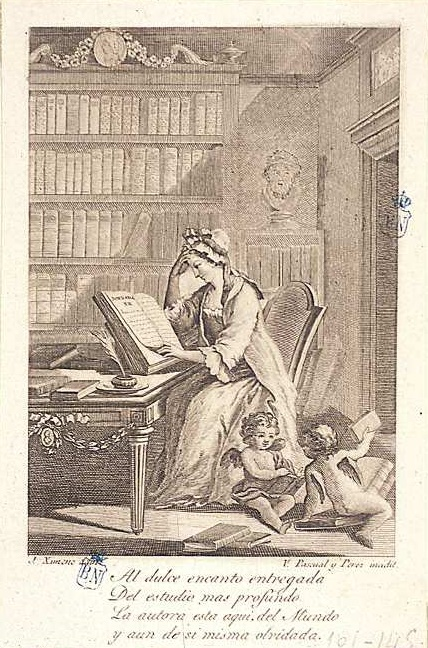
Madame de Gómez reading in her study

Madeleine-Angélique de Gomez (née Poisson; pseudonym M.P.V.D.G.; 22 November 1684 – 28 December 1770) was a French writer and playwright.

== Biography ==
Madeleine-Angelique was born in Paris on 22 November 1684 to the actor Paul Poisson.

Madeleine-Angélique married a Spanish nobleman, Don Gabriel de Gomez, thinking he was rich. When she discovered her husband was burdened with debt, she turned to writing as a hope to escape poverty. Her first a tragedy, Habis, was released in 1714 to much critical appeal, being played at the Comédie-Française with a revival in 1732.

Between 1722 and 1772, Gomez published eight editions of Les Journées amusantes, with the work being translated into English by Eliza Haywood.

While most of her work was published under the name Madame de Gomez (M^{me} de Gomez), some of her works have been published under the pseudonym M.P.V.D.G.

She died in Saint-Germain-en-Laye on 28 December 1770 at the age of 86.

== Published works ==
=== Plays ===
- Habis, tragédie (1714)
- Cléarque, tyran d'Héraclée, tragédie (1733 - English translation: Cléarchus, Tyrant of Heraclea, a tragedy)
- Marsidie reine des Cimbres, tragédie (1735 - English translation: Marsidie, Queen of the Cimbri)
- Semiramis, tragédie (1737 - English translation: Semiramis, tragedy)

=== Novels ===
- Anecdotes persanes, dédiées au roy (1727 - English translation: Persian Anecdotes, dedicated to the King)
- Anecdotes, ou Histoire secrette de la maison ottomane (1722 - English translation: Anecdotes, or Secret History of the Ottoman House)
- Crémentine, reine de Sanga; histoire indienne (1727 - English translation: Creatine, Queen of Sanga: Indian History)
- Entretiens nocturnes de Mercure et de La Renommée, au jardin des Thuilleries (1714 - English translation: Nocturnal interviews of Mercury and La Renommée (Note: La Renommée is an alternate name for Pheme. There is a statue of her riding Pegasus in the Tuileries Garden.) in the Tuileries Garden.)
- Histoire de Jean de Calais, roi de Portugal, ou, La vertu recompensee (1731 - English translation: The History of Jean de Calais, King of Portugal, or Virtue Rewarded)
- Histoire d'Osman premier du nom, XIXe empereur des Turcs, et de l'impératrice Aphendina Ashada (1734 - English translation: History of Osman, first of the name, XIXth emperor of the Turks, and of the empress Aphendina Ashada)
- Histoire du comte d’Oxfort, de Miledy d’Herby, d’Eustache de Saint-Pierre et de Beatrix de Guines au siège de la ville de Calais, sous le règne de Philippe de Valois, roi de France & de Navarré, en 1346 & 1347(1765 - English translation: History of the Count of Oxford, of Miledy of Herby, of Eustace of St. Peter and of Beatrix of Guines at the siege of the city of Calais, under the reign of Philip of Valois, King of France and of Navarre, in 1346 and 1347)
- Histoire secrette de la conqueste de Grenade (1723 - English translation: The secret history of the conquest of Granada)
- Histoires du comte d'Oxfort, de Miledy d'Herby, d'Eustache de S. Pierre, et de Beatrix de Guine (1738 - English translation: Stories of the Earl of Oxford, of Milady of Herby, of Eustace of St. Peter, and of Beatrix of Guinea)
- La jeune Alcidiane (1733 - English translation: The Young Alcidiane)
- Les journées amusantes, dédiées au roi (1722 - English translation by Eliza Haywood: La Belle Assemblée published 1724–1734)

=== Collections and editions ===
- Œuvres mêlées de Madame de Gomez:contenant ses tragedies & differens ouvrages en vers et en prose (1724 - English translation: Collected Works of Madame de Gomez: Containing her Tragedies and Various Works in Verse and Prose)
- Cent nouvelles nouvelles (published in multiple parts between 1732 and 1739 - English translation: The Hundred News)
