= List of avisos of Germany =

Lithograph of Greif (left), Meteor (center), and Jagd (right) by Willy Stöwer

The German navies, beginning with the Prussian Navy in the 1840s, acquired a series of avisos for use in a variety of roles, including as scouts, flagships for gunboat flotillas, and dispatch vessels. The first such vessel, SMS Preussischer Adler, was a packet steamer requisitioned for service during the First Schleswig War in 1848, though she returned to civilian duty after the war. In 1850, the Prussians ordered a pair of small vessels—the Nix class—from Britain; like Preussischer Adler, these were both paddle steamers. The first screw-driven aviso followed in 1856: the French-built Grille. Another paddle steamer, Loreley, was laid down in 1858, the first vessel of the type built in a German shipyard. Many of these vessels served as yachts for the royal and later imperial family. During the Second Schleswig War, Loreley and Preussischer Adler saw action at the Battles of Jasmind and Heligoland, respectively.

At the start of the Franco-Prussian War in 1870, the Prussians purchased Falke and requisitioned Pommerania. Grille engaged French forces in the Baltic during the war, but the rest of the fleet's avisos saw little activity in the conflict. Zieten, the first torpedo-armed aviso to be built for what was now the German Imperial Navy, was also the last major warship to be built abroad for the Imperial German fleet. The 1880s saw a significant aviso construction program that included two Blitz-class avisos, Greif, two Wacht-class avisos, and two Meteor-class avisos. The latter two classes were disappointments in service owing to their small size, insufficient speed, and in the case of the Meteors, excessive vibration from their engines. SMS Hela, the last vessel of the type to be built for the Imperial fleet, was completed in 1895. The Germans thereafter built light cruisers that fulfilled the roles occupied by the avisos; the first of these, the Gazelle class, combined the best features of Hela with those of contemporary unprotected cruisers. Hela was herself sunk in September 1914 during World War I; the other vessels still in service saw little active use during the war and were all broken up afterward.

One final vessel, Grille, was built in the mid-1930s for use as a yacht for Adolf Hitler. During World War II, she was used as a minelayer, a training ship, and a stationary headquarters ship in Norway before being seized by Britain. She was sold after the war to a private owner and was ultimately scrapped in 1951.

Key
Armament	The number and type of guns in the primary armament
Displacement	Ship displacement at full combat load
Propulsion	Number of shafts, type of propulsion system, and top speed generated
Service	The dates work began and finished on the ship and its ultimate fate
Laid down	The date the keel assembly commenced
Commissioned	The date the ship was commissioned

== Kaiserliche Marine ==
=== Preussischer Adler ===
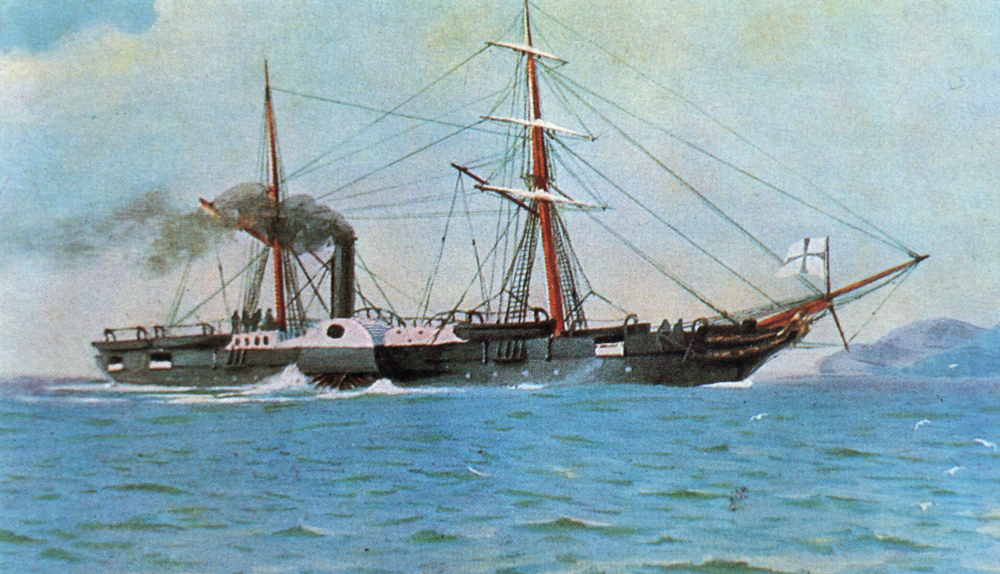
Painting of Preussischer Adler by Christopher Rave

Preussischer Adler was an iron-hulled paddle steamer originally built for the Prussian postal service to operate on the packet route between Prussia and Russia in the mid-1840s. At the time, the Prussian Navy was an anemic force consisting of a handful of small sailing vessels and cannon-armed yawls. The ship was requisitioned early in her career during the First Schleswig War to defend the Prussian coast from the more powerful Danish Navy that imposed a blockade on Prussia's and the other German states' ports. She took part in a short battle with the Danish brig St. Croix, the first engagement involving the Prussian fleet. She returned to commercial duties after the war and served in that capacity uneventfully until 1862, when the expansion of the Prussian Eastern Railway rendered her superfluous. Purchased by the Prussian Navy, she was in the Mediterranean Sea with a pair of gunboats on the eve of the Second Schleswig War. The ships were recalled to Prussia but arrived after the outbreak of war. They joined a pair of Austrian screw frigates to attack the Danish blockade squadron in the Battle of Heligoland, though the Austrians bore the brunt of Danish fire. She served as the flagship of Prussian vessels in the Baltic Sea during the Franco-Prussian War of 1870–1871, but saw no action. Reduced to subsidiary duties in 1872, including as a training ship and fisheries protection vessel, she was ultimately decommissioned in April 1877 and sunk as a target two years later in June 1879.

Summary of the Preussischer Adler class
Ship	Armament	Displacement	Propulsion	Service		
Ship	Armament	Displacement	Propulsion	Laid down	Commissioned	Fate
Preussischer Adler	2 × 25-pound mortars	1,430 t (1,410 long tons)	2 × paddle wheels, 1 × marine steam engine, 10.5 knots (19.4 km/h; 12.1 mph)	1846	1846	Sunk as a target, 26 June 1879

=== Nix class ===
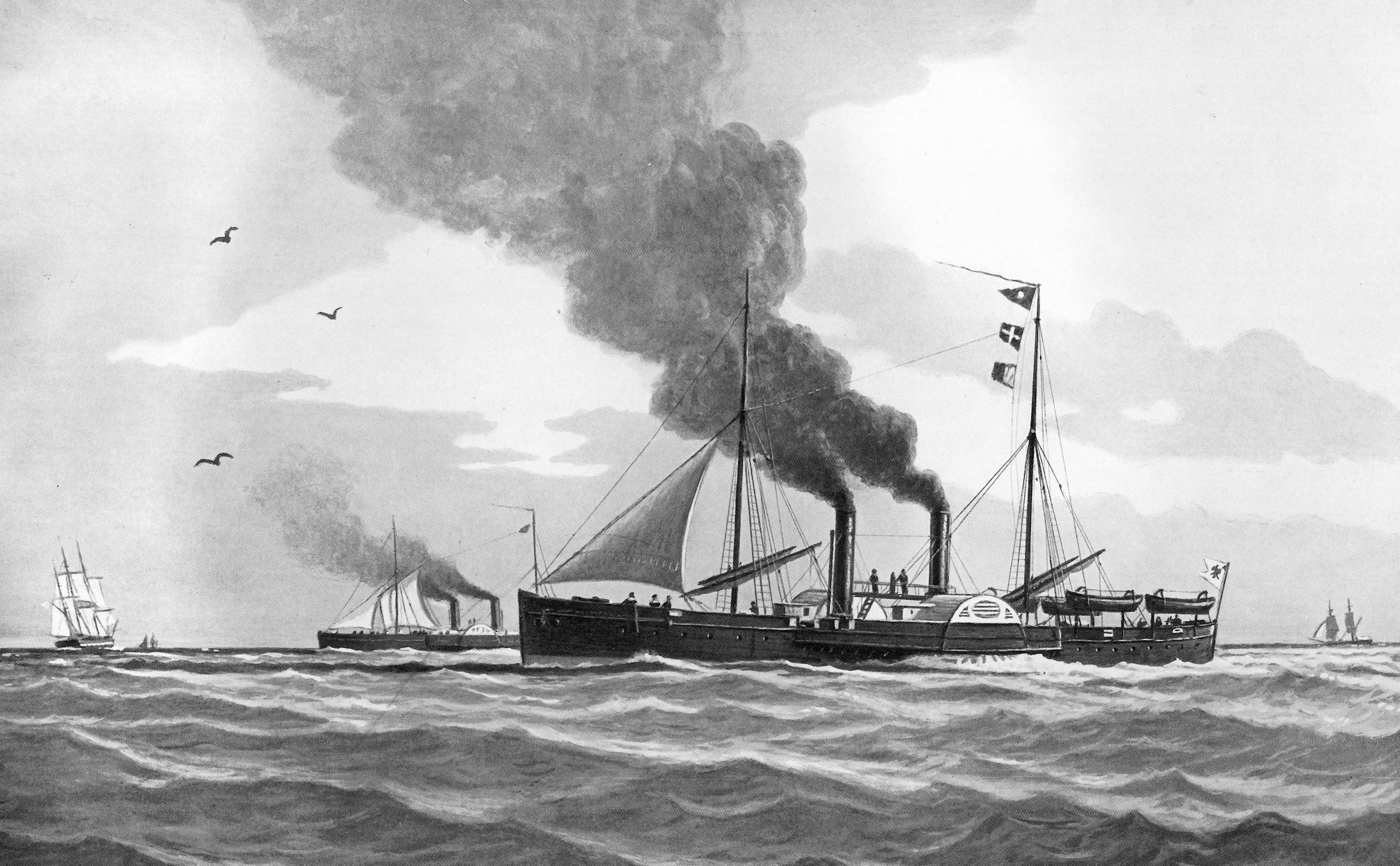
Nix and Salamander in a 1905 painting by Lüder Arenhold

The two Nix-class avisos were ordered in the immediate aftermath of the First Schleswig War as part of a program intended to strengthen the Prussian fleet. Prince Adalbert of Prussia, one of the leading advocates for a larger navy, initially sought to have the ships built in Prussia, but domestic shipbuilders had little experience with steam ships, and so contracted with a British firm to build the vessels in 1850. The ships' careers in Prussian service proved to be short and uneventful, apart from repeated boiler fires aboard Nix. The Prussians were not satisfied with the ships, in part a result of Nix's fires and general unfamiliarity with operating steamships. They sold the vessels to Britain in exchange for the sail frigate Thetis in 1855; Nix and Salamander became HMS Weser and Recruit, respectively. The former saw action during the Crimean War at the Battle of Kinburn later that year, but both ships thereafter saw little use in the Royal Navy. Both were out of service by the mid-1860s, with Recruit being sold for scrap in 1869 and Weser following her to the breaker's yard in 1873.

Summary of the Nix class
Ship	Armament	Displacement	Propulsion	Service		
Ship	Armament	Displacement	Propulsion	Laid down	Commissioned	Fate
Nix	4 × 25-pound mortars	430 t (420 long tons)	2 × paddle wheels, 2 × marine steam engines, 13 knots (24 km/h; 15 mph)	1850	1850	Sold to Britain, 1855; broken up, 1873
Salamander	4 × 25-pound mortars	430 t (420 long tons)	2 × paddle wheels, 2 × marine steam engines, 13 knots (24 km/h; 15 mph)	1850	1850	Sold to Britain, 1855; broken up, 1869

=== Grille ===
Grille in her original configuration

Grille was ordered in 1855 as part of Adalbert's fleet expansion program; she was the first steam ship to use a screw propeller rather than the paddle wheels of earlier vessels. She was initially unarmed, being used as a royal yacht until the outbreak of the Second Schleswig War. She sortied on 16 April with Adalbert aboard to attack the Danish blockade squadron in the Baltic, resulting in an inconclusive encounter with the Danish ship of the line Skjold and the steam frigate Sjælland. She next engaged the steam frigate Tordenskjold on 24 April. She sortied twice more by early May, but on both occasions encountered far superior Danish forces and withdrew without attacking.

Grille served as a yacht after the war, taking Crown Prince Friedrich to the opening ceremonies for the Suez Canal in 1867. During the Franco-Prussian War, she once again served in the Baltic, and she engaged a French blockade squadron on 17 July, interrupting French plans to attack Swinemünde. Grille remained in service through the early 1910s, serving in a variety of roles, including as a fleet scout, a tender, and a training vessel. She ended her career as a tender for the cruiser Freya as part of the training establishment for the Mürwik Naval School. Decommissioned for the last time in 1918, she was the longest-serving vessel of the Imperial Navy, having been on active service for sixty-two years. She was then sold for scrap in 1920.

Summary of the Grille class
Ship	Armament	Displacement	Propulsion	Service		
Ship	Armament	Displacement	Propulsion	Laid down	Commissioned	Fate
Grille	2 × 12-pound guns	491 t (483 long tons)	1 × screw propeller, 1 × marine steam engine, 13 knots	1856	3 June 1858	Broken up, 1920

=== Loreley ===
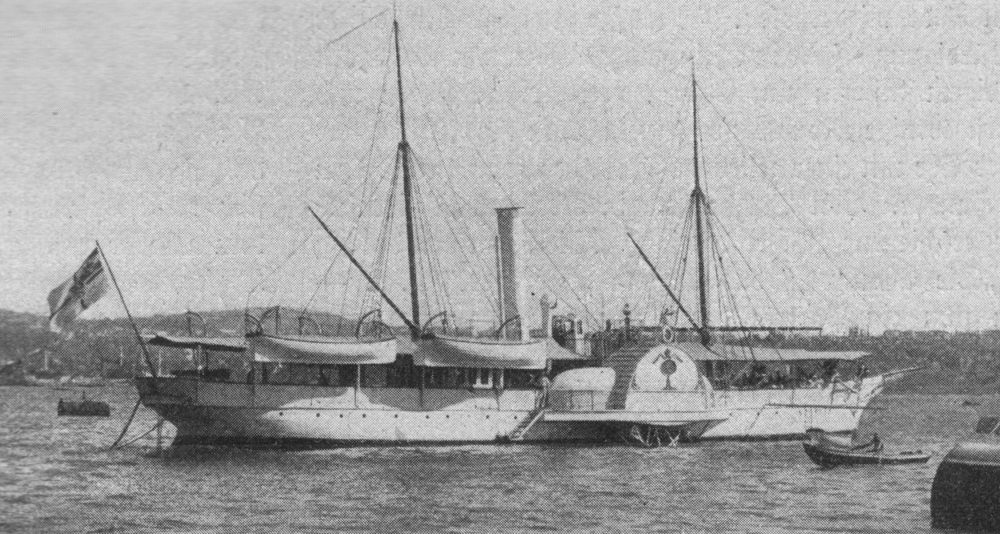
Loreley in her later configuration

With Grille serving as a yacht in the 1850s, the Prussian Navy decided it needed another aviso to serve as a flagship for the gunboat flotillas defending the country's Baltic coast. The designers reverted to paddle wheels and a wooden hull, as they were not convinced of the long-term utility of iron hulls or screw propulsion. The ship went to the Mediterranean in 1860 to protect Prussian nationals in Italy during the Second Italian War of Independence. She served in her intended role during the Second Schleswig War, and saw action at the Battle of Jasmund against the Danish blockade squadron in March 1864, where she was hit only once. She was decommissioned after the war and saw no further service for the rest of the decade.

In poor condition by the late 1860s, Loreley was heavily rebuilt in 1869–1873, leading some historians to treat the vessel as two different ships. In 1879, the ship was sent to Constantinople, the capital of the Ottoman Empire, to serve as the station ship there, a right enjoyed by all of the European Great Powers after the Crimean War (which was intended to counter Russian expansionism at the expense of the Ottomans). She served there for the rest of her career. During this period, she helped to protect German interests in Egypt during the 'Urabi revolt in 1882, conducted training cruises in the Mediterranean, and sent men ashore in 1895 to protect Germans from domestic unrest in the Ottoman Empire. Worn out by 1896, she was decommissioned and sold later that year, but her ultimate fate is unknown.

Summary of the Loreley class
Ship	Armament	Displacement	Propulsion	Service		
Ship	Armament	Displacement	Propulsion	Laid down	Commissioned	Fate
Loreley	2 × 12-pounder guns	470 t (460 long tons)	2 × paddle wheels, 1 × marine steam engine, 10.5 knots	1 February 1858	28 September 1859	Unknown

=== Falke ===
Falke was originally built as a speculative project by her British constructors, who intended to sell the vessel to the Confederate States Navy for use as a blockade runner during the American Civil War. By the time work on the vessel was completed, however, the war was over, leaving the shipyard without a buyer. A private shipowner in the Netherlands purchased the vessel, renamed her Heinrich Heister, and left it idle in Rotterdam for the next five years. She was purchased by what was now the North German Federal Navy in August 1870, shortly after the outbreak of the Franco-Prussian War, but she was accidentally rammed by the ironclad turret ship Arminius shortly after entering service as Falke, causing serious damage that ended her wartime career. She operated with the fleet during the 1870s, but suffered repeated machinery breakdowns, thereafter serving as a tender for the Marinestation der Nordsee (North Sea Naval Station) in the early 1880s. Later in the decade, she was used for fisheries protection before being decommissioned in 1888, struck from the naval register in 1890, and sold for scrap in 1892.

Summary of the Falke class
Ship	Armament	Displacement	Propulsion	Service		
Ship	Armament	Displacement	Propulsion	Laid down	Commissioned	Fate
Falke	2 × 12 cm (4.7 in) breechloading guns	1,230 t (1,210 long tons)	2 × paddle wheels, 1 × marine steam engine, 15 knots (28 km/h; 17 mph)	1865	4 October 1870	Broken up, 1892

=== Pommerania ===
Pommerania in 1887

Pommerania was built for the Prussian postal service as a packet steamer, though the exact nature of her design and construction is uncertain. The navy's chief designer prepared the plans for the ship and the navy subsidized construction costs, which led the naval historians Hans Hildebrand, Albert Röhr, and Hans-Otto Steinmetz to suggest that the navy wanted to have a steamship it could requisition when needed but would not have to maintain. The navy brought the ship into commission during the Franco-Prussian War but crew shortages delayed conversion until after the war. She was used for fishing surveys in 1871 and 1872, with this work providing the scientific basis for the German Fisheries Act passed in 1874. She went to the Mediterranean with the ironclad training squadron in 1876 in response to the murder of a German diplomat in Salonika. She remained in the region after the outbreak of the Russo-Turkish War of 1877–1878, staying in Constantinople with Loreley. After returning to Germany, she served as a tender to the Marinestation der Nordsee from 1881 to 1884, thereafter seeing service as a fisheries protection vessel and survey ship. Decommissioned in 1889 and struck in 1890, she was sold to a shipping company, converted into a sailing schooner, and renamed Adler. She was lost in a storm on her maiden voyage on 20 January 1894.

Summary of the Pommerania class
Ship	Armament	Displacement	Propulsion	Service		
Ship	Armament	Displacement	Propulsion	Laid down	Commissioned	Fate
Pommerania	2 × 8 cm (3.1 in) hoop guns	460 t (450 long tons)	2 × paddle wheels, 1 × marine steam engine, 14.5 knots (26.9 km/h; 16.7 mph)	1864	27 April 1871	Converted to merchant ship, sank in a storm, 20 January 1894

=== Zieten ===
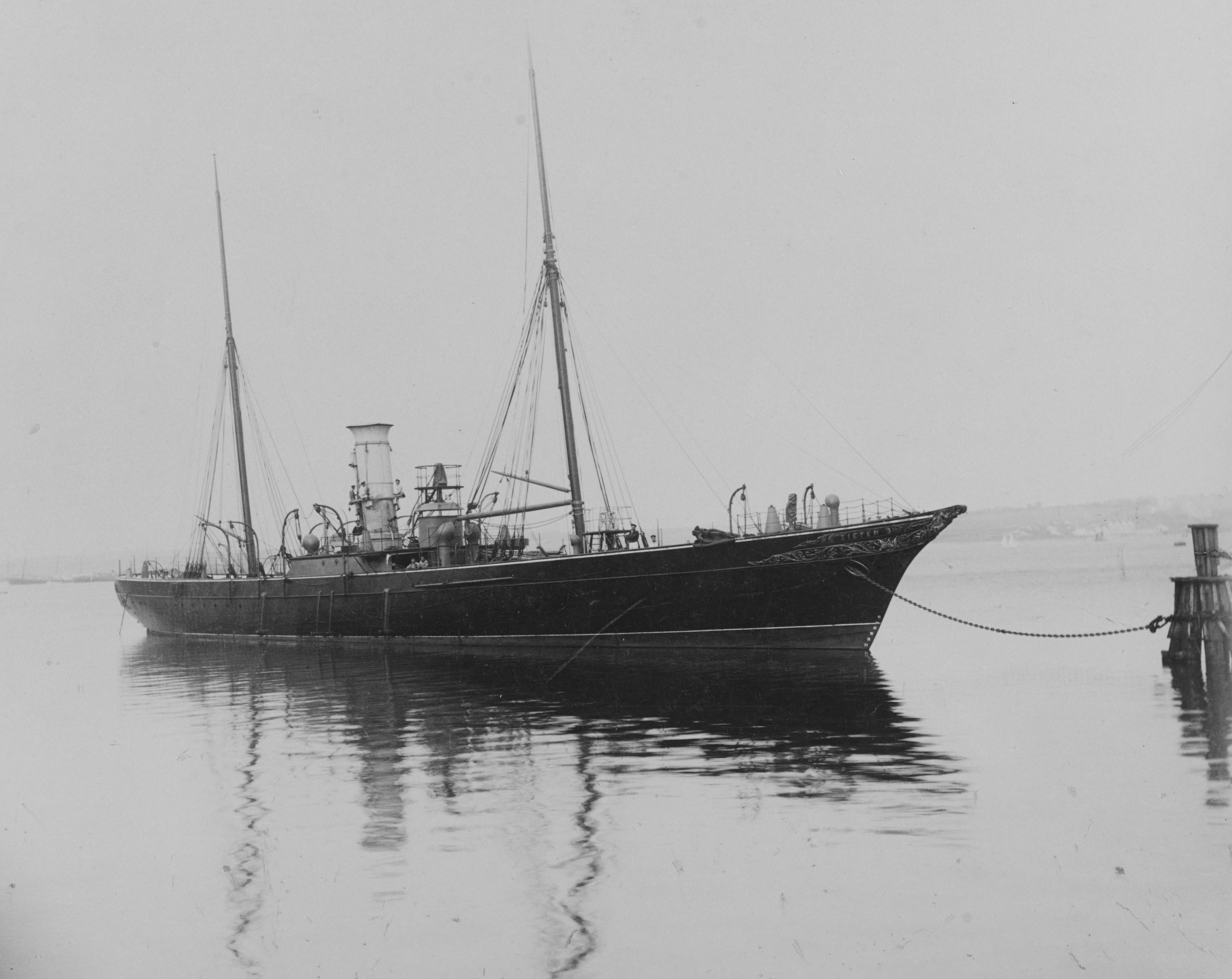
Zieten

Beginning in 1869, the North German Federal Navy, under the direction of Albrecht von Stosch, began to consider the new self-propelled Whitehead torpedoes; Stosch authorized construction of a new aviso to test the weapons in 1873. Laid down at the Thames Iron Works, Zieten was the last major warship of the Imperial German fleet to be built overseas. Zieten proved to be highly influential, as experiments with the new torpedoes not only led to further construction of torpedo-armed warships, but also inspired similar vessels in the French, Italian, and Austro-Hungarian fleets. The Austro-Hungarian chief of construction, Josef von Romako, based his design of the Zara-class cruisers directly on that of Zieten.

Future admiral Otto von Diederichs served aboard the ship during her first year in service, which involved tests of the bow torpedo tubes that demonstrated that the bow tube, located in the hull below the waterline, was not satisfactory; Diederichs arranged for the tube to be moved to a swivel mount on the deck. Another future admiral, Alfred von Tirpitz, took command of the vessel in 1878; during training exercises in 1880, Tirpitz arranged a demonstration of the vessel's effectiveness by sinking the old paddle steamer Barbarossa. Zieten went to the Mediterranean during the 'Urabi revolt in 1882 along with several other vessels. She saw limited service in the 1890s, including as a fisheries vessel until the start of World War I in 1914, after which she was used as a guard ship. She was ultimately sold for scrap in 1921.

Summary of the Zieten class
Ship	Armament	Displacement	Propulsion	Service		
Ship	Armament	Displacement	Propulsion	Laid down	Commissioned	Fate
Zieten	2 × 38 cm (15 in) torpedo tubes	1,170 t (1,150 long tons)	2 × screw propellers, 2 × marine steam engines, 16 knots (30 km/h; 18 mph)	1875	1 August 1876	Broken up, 1921

=== Blitz class ===
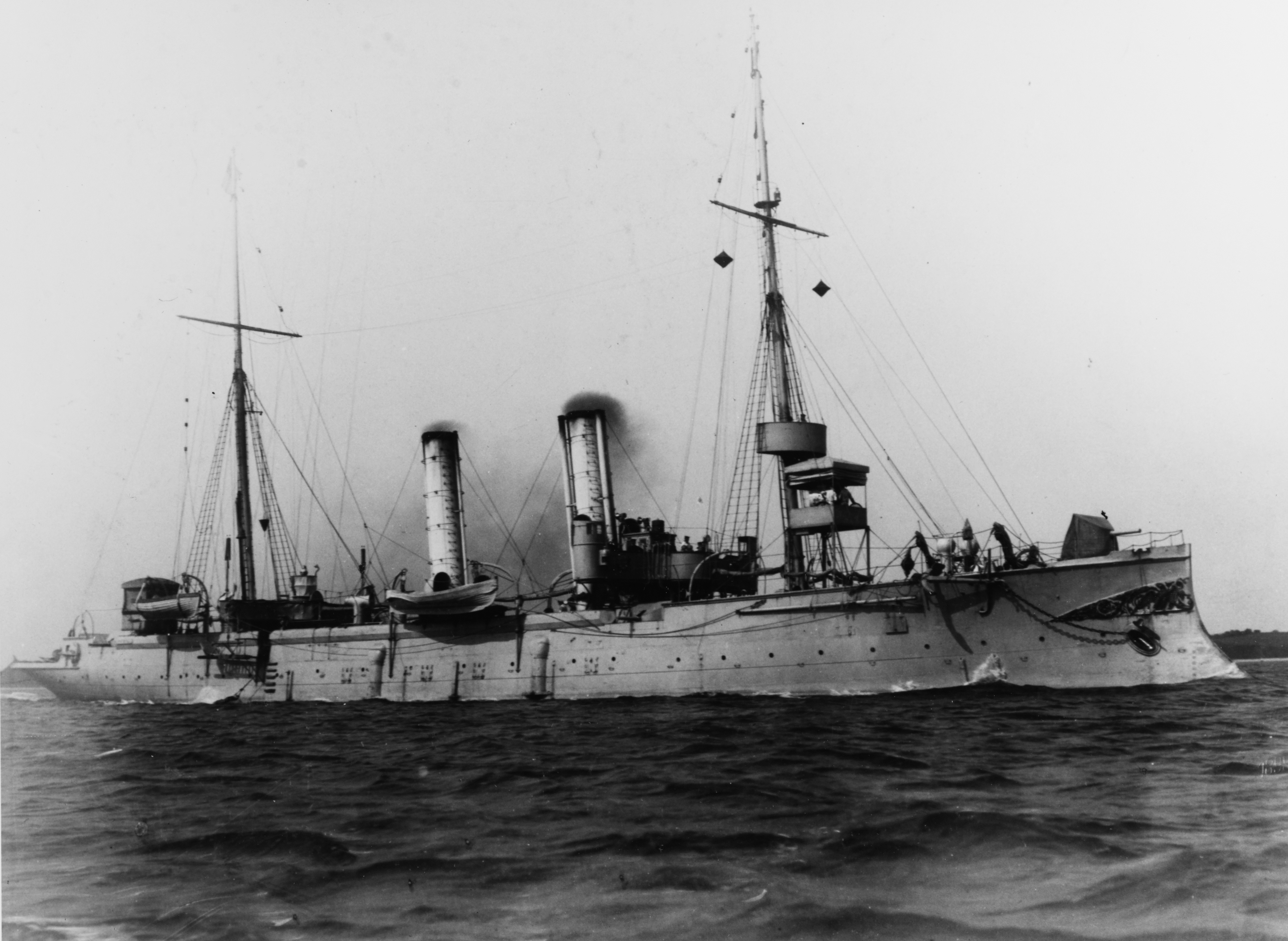
Pfeil in 1899

The Blitz-class ships were the first modern avisos built for the German fleet; they were the first German vessels of any type with steel hulls, and they abandoned traditional sailing rigs. They provided the basis for future developments that ultimately produced the light cruisers of the Gazelle class. The ships were initially armed with a 12.5 cm (4.9 in) gun and a 35 cm (13.8 in) torpedo tube, though their armament was improved in the early 1890s, including the addition of two more torpedo tubes.

The ships had extensive careers, remaining in active service for more than thirty years. Blitz spent much of her career as a flotilla leader for torpedo boats, while Pfeil served with the training squadron and the main fleet. Pfeil was deployed to German East Africa in 1889 to suppress the Abushiri revolt, returning to Germany in 1890. Throughout the 1890s, the ships served with the fleet, conducting a yearly routine of exercises and training cruises. They served in a variety of additional roles during the 1890s and 1900s, including as tenders, fishery protection vessels, and training ships. They operated as dedicated tenders to the battle squadrons of the High Seas Fleet by the mid-1900s, filling that role through the start of World War I. Blitz took part in Operation Albion in the Baltic Sea in late 1917 and Pfeil was later used as a training ship for U-boat crews. Both ships were discarded in the early 1920s.

Summary of the Blitz class
Ship	Armament	Displacement	Propulsion	Service		
Ship	Armament	Displacement	Propulsion	Laid down	Commissioned	Fate
Blitz	1 × 12.5 cm (4.9 in) K L/23 gun 1 × 35 cm (13.8 in) torpedo tube	1,486 t (1,463 long tons)	2 × screw propellers, 2 × marine steam engines, 15.7 knots (29.1 km/h; 18.1 mph)	1881	28 March 1883	Broken up, 1921
Pfeil	1 × 12.5 cm (4.9 in) K L/23 gun 1 × 35 cm (13.8 in) torpedo tube	1,486 t (1,463 long tons)	2 × screw propellers, 2 × marine steam engines, 15.7 knots (29.1 km/h; 18.1 mph)	1881	25 November 1884	Broken up, 1922

=== Greif ===
Greif

Greif was designed at a time when torpedoes had become effective weapons and spurred the development of the Jeune École concept, which held that cheap torpedo boats could destroy large, expensive battleships. She was intended to guard the capital ships of the fleet against torpedo boat attacks, and for this role, she carried a battery of 10.5 cm (4.1 in) and 3.7 cm (1.5 in) guns. Unlike other German avisos of the period, she carried no torpedo tubes. Greif was not a successful warship, however, and she spent much of her career laid up, out of service.

Completed in 1887, Greif was not commissioned until 1889. She remained in service with the fleet only until October 1890, when she was tasked with torpedo testing, a role she filled until 1894 when she was decommissioned. Recommissioned in May 1897, she served as a fleet scout for the next two years, thereafter being reduced to secondary roles once again, including as a training ship, before being decommissioned for the last time in September 1900. Greif was struck from the naval register in 1912, hulked in 1915 during World War I, and used as a mine storage hulk in 1917. After the war, she was sold to ship breakers in 1921 and dismantled in Hamburg.

Summary of the Greif class
Ship	Armament	Displacement	Propulsion	Service		
Ship	Armament	Displacement	Propulsion	Laid down	Commissioned	Fate
Greif	2 × 10.5 cm (4.1 in) L/35 guns	2,266 t (2,230 long tons)	2 × screws, 2 × marine steam engines, 18 knots (33 km/h; 21 mph)	1885	9 July 1887	Broken up, 1921

=== Wacht class ===
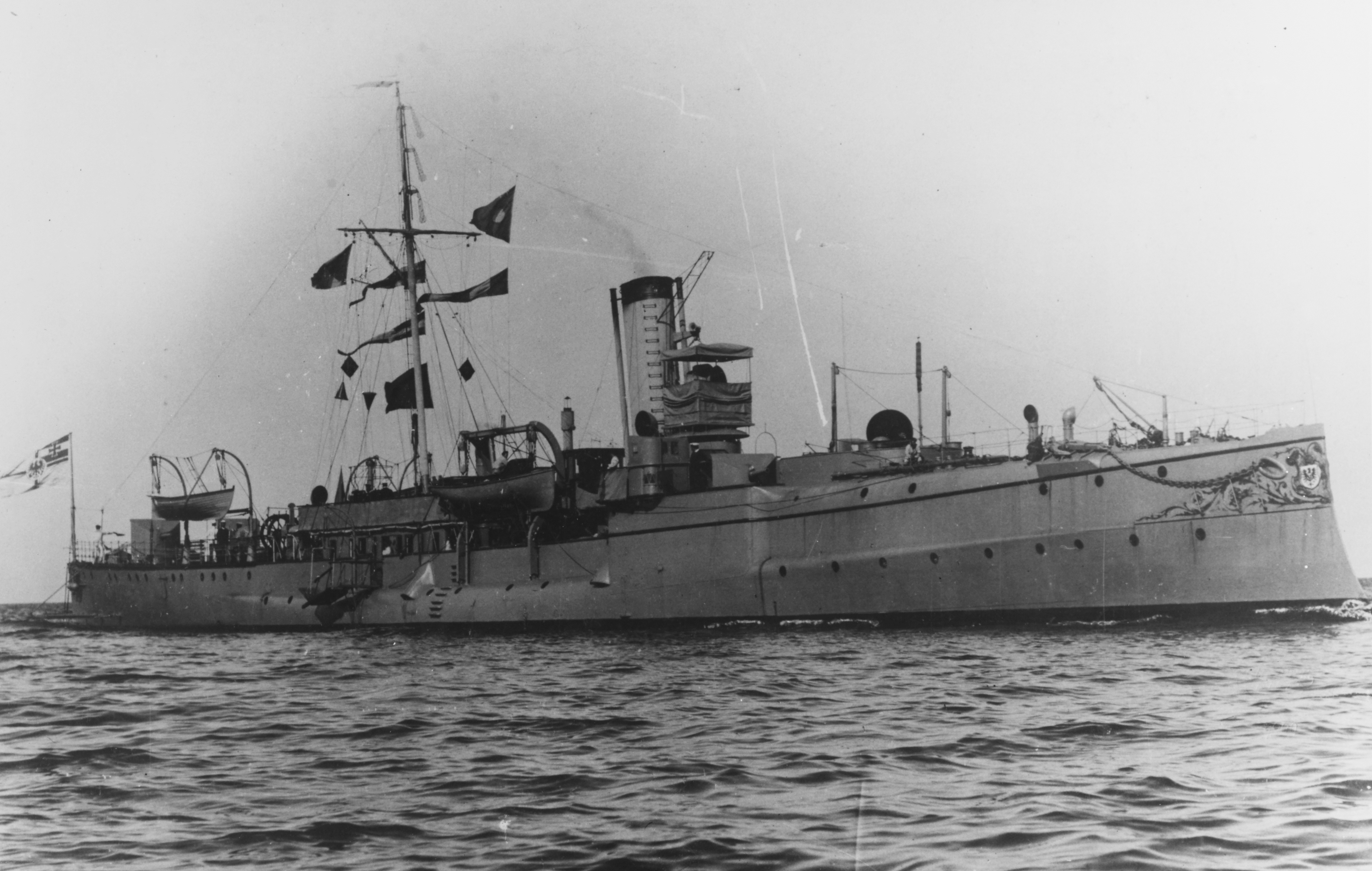
Wacht in 1899

Following the appointment of General Leo von Caprivi as the German admiralty chief in 1883, the navy began to experiment more seriously with torpedo boats. Caprivi embraced some of the ideas of the Jeune École doctrine, mostly importantly the theory that cheap torpedo boats could be used for coastal defense instead of larger, more expensive ironclads. This strategy found favor in the Reichstag (Imperial Diet), which generally opposed expanding the naval budget. Caprivi ordered the next pair of avisos—the Wacht class—with characteristics that would allow them to operate offensively with the torpedo boat flotillas. Their high speed came at the expense of gun armament and size (and thus seakeeping), discarding the more balanced Blitz design. As a result, the Wachts were disappointments in service.

The two ships spent most of their careers with the main fleet. Wacht went on a major cruise to the Mediterranean Sea in 1889. Jagd was the first ship to pass through the Kaiser Wilhelm Canal in 1895 before the canal officially opened. Badly worn out by mid-1901, Jagd was decommissioned in August. The following month, Wacht was accidentally rammed and sunk by the ironclad Sachsen, though her entire crew was safely evacuated. Jagd was struck from the register in 1910 and used as a torpedo training platform until 1920, when she was sold for scrap.

Summary of the Wacht class
Ship	Armament	Displacement	Propulsion	Service		
Ship	Armament	Displacement	Propulsion	Laid down	Commissioned	Fate
Wacht	3 × 10.5 cm L/35 guns 3 × 35 cm torpedo tubes	1,499 t (1,475 long tons)	2 × screws, 2 × marine steam engines, 19 knots (35 km/h; 22 mph)	1886	9 August 1888	Sunk in collision, 1901
Jagd	3 × 10.5 cm L/35 guns 3 × 35 cm torpedo tubes	1,499 t (1,475 long tons)	2 × screws, 2 × marine steam engines, 19 knots (35 km/h; 22 mph)	1887	25 June 1889	Broken up, 1920

=== Meteor class ===
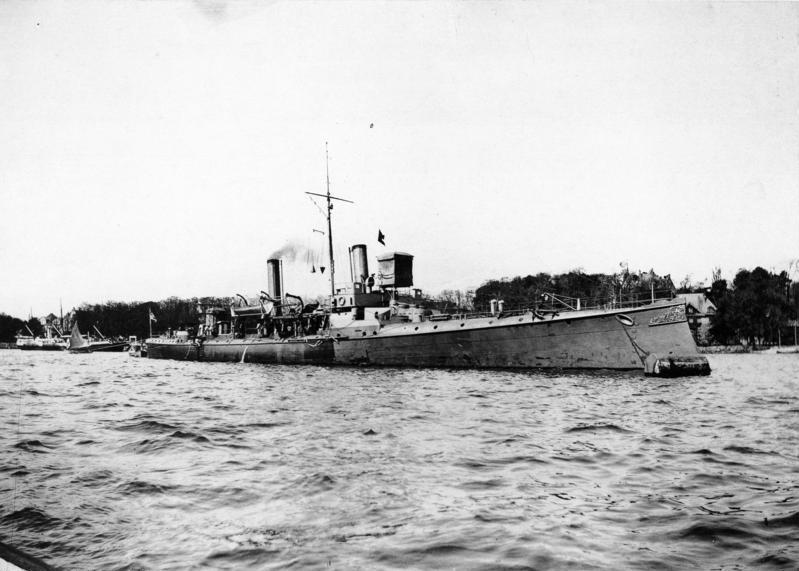
Meteor at anchor

Unlike earlier avisos built for the fleet, which were designed to fill a variety of roles, the Meteor class was intended to protect the fleet's capital ships from torpedo boat attacks. They were armed with a battery of four 8.8 cm (3.5 in) quick-firing guns. Both vessels suffered from serious problems that rendered them unfit for service, namely poor seakeeping and excessive vibration of their propeller shafts. As a result, they saw little service, with Comet's only periods in commission being to test what were unsuccessful attempts to correct the problems. Meteor had a somewhat more active career, serving with the fleet in 1893–1894 and then as a fishery protection ship in 1895–1896, but she, too, spent most of her existence laid up. Both vessels were decommissioned in 1896 and struck from the naval register in 1911. Meteor was then used as a barracks ship, while Comet became a storage hulk; the two ships were broken up in 1919 and 1921, respectively.

Summary of the Meteor class
Ship	Armament	Displacement	Propulsion	Service		
Ship	Armament	Displacement	Propulsion	Laid down	Commissioned	Fate
Meteor	4 × 8.8 cm guns 3 × 35 cm torpedo tubes	1,078 t (1,061 long tons)	2 × screws, 2 × marine steam engines, 19.5 knots (36.1 km/h; 22.4 mph)	1888	19 May 1891	Broken up, 1919
Comet	4 × 8.8 cm guns 3 × 35 cm torpedo tubes	1,117 t (1,099 long tons)	2 × screws, 2 × marine steam engines, 19.5 knots (36.1 km/h; 22.4 mph)	1890	29 April 1893	Broken up, 1920

=== Hela ===
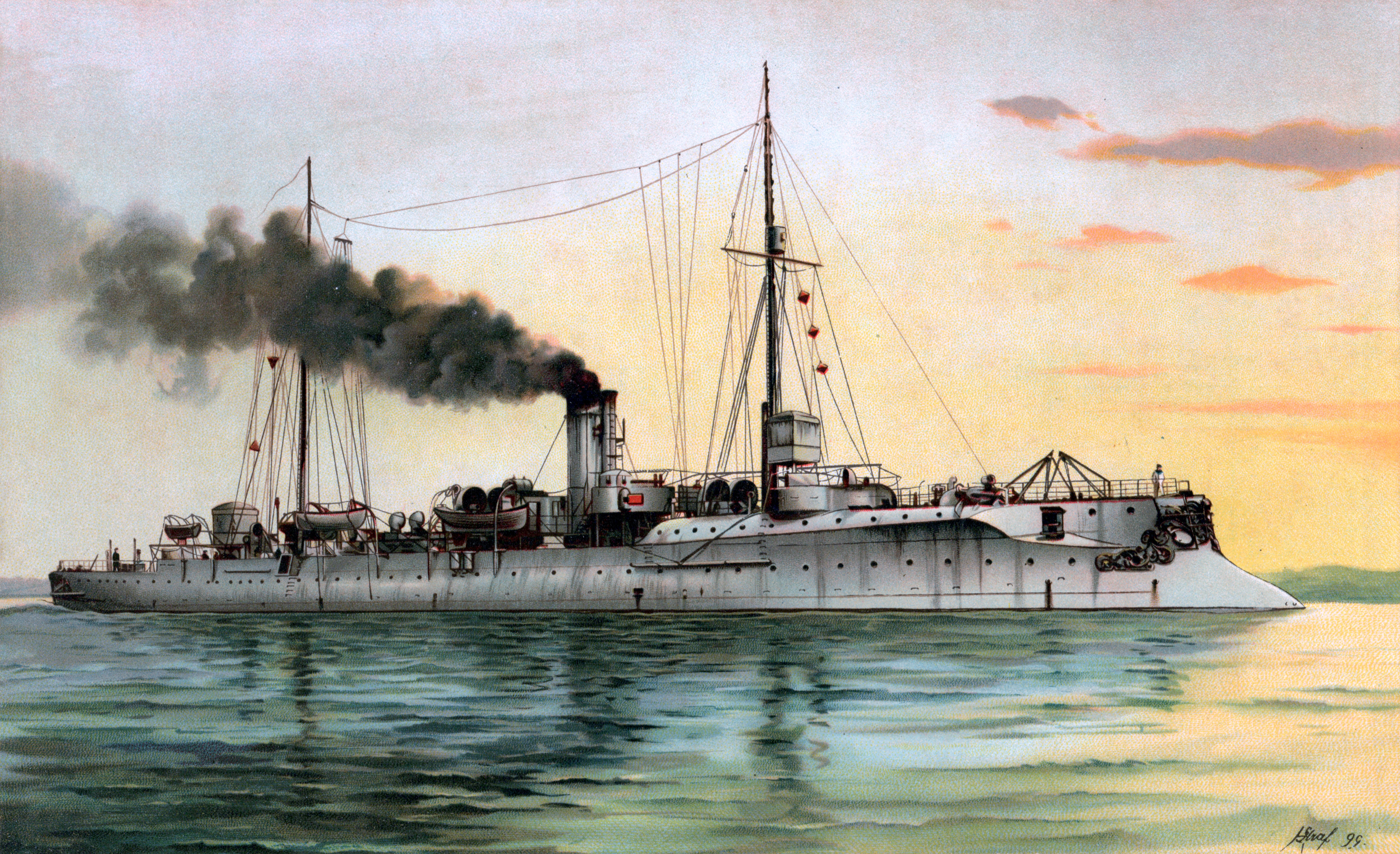
A 1902 lithograph of Hela

Hela's design was intended to correct many of the deficiencies in the Wacht and Meteor classes, mainly through an increase in size that would produce improved seaworthiness. She was also a knot faster, which increased her usefulness as a fleet scout. She nevertheless proved to be too weakly armed for fleet service, and the next cruising-type vessels to be built in Germany were the Gazelle-class light cruisers; they were the first vessels of that type to be built, and they incorporated the best aspects of Hela and the unprotected cruisers that had been built in the 1880s and 1890s.

The ship served with the fleet from 1898 to 1902, and during this period, from mid-1900 to mid-1901, she was deployed as part of an expeditionary force sent to help suppress the Boxer Uprising in Qing China. The naval command decided her armament was insufficient for front-line use, so she was extensively modernized between 1903 and 1910, thereafter serving as a tender until the outbreak of World War I. She was then assigned to support the patrols in the German Bight. She was present at the Battle of Helgoland Bight in August 1914 but was not directly engaged. The following month, she was torpedoed and sunk by the British submarine HMS E9 while steaming off Helgoland, though only two men were lost in the sinking.

Summary of the Hela class
Ship	Armament	Displacement	Propulsion	Service		
Ship	Armament	Displacement	Propulsion	Laid down	Commissioned	Fate
Hela	4 × 8.8 cm guns 3 × 45 cm (17.7 in) torpedo tubes	2,082 t (2,049 long tons)	2 × screws, 2 × triple-expansion steam engines, 20 knots (37 km/h; 23 mph)	1893	3 May 1896	Sunk, 13 September 1914

== Kriegsmarine ==
=== Grille ===
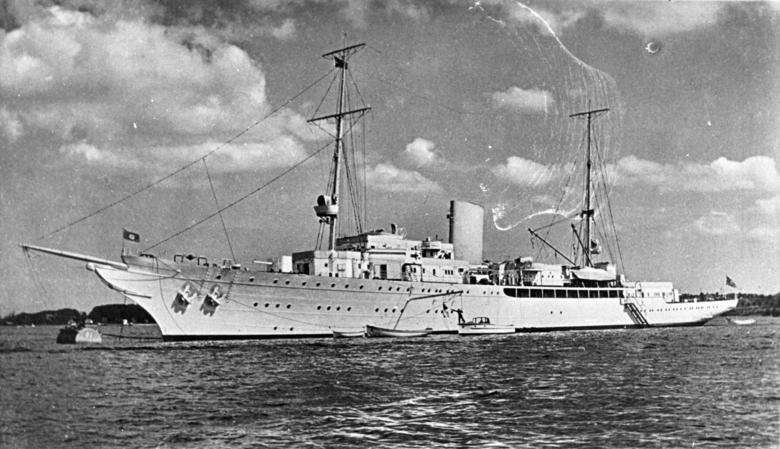
Grille in the 1930s

Grille, the last aviso built in Germany, was ordered as a state yacht for dictator Adolf Hitler and other elements of the Nazi regime. She was fitted with experimental high-pressure steam turbines to evaluate them for future warships. The ship was used in a variety of roles during her career with the Kriegsmarine (War Navy); in the late 1930s, in addition to her duties as a yacht, she was employed as a training ship and a target for torpedo training. After the start of World War II, she was used as an auxiliary minelayer, and was briefly assigned to participate in Operation Sea Lion in that capacity before it was cancelled in September 1940. She was also used to lay minefields during the German invasion of the Soviet Union—Operation Barbarossa—in mid-1941. She was then used as a training ship until March 1942, when she was reduced to a headquarters ship for naval forces in Norway. She filled that role until the end of the war in May 1945, when she was seized by British forces. Grille was then sold to a Lebanese businessman, and, after arriving in Beirut, was attacked by Jewish commandos in 1947 because they incorrectly suspected that it would be used against Jewish forces during the ongoing civil war in Palestine. Grille was ultimately sold to ship-breakers in the United States and dismantled in 1951.

Summary of the Grille class
Ship	Armament	Displacement	Propulsion	Service		
Ship	Armament	Displacement	Propulsion	Laid down	Commissioned	Fate
Grille	3 × 12.7 cm (5 in) SK C/34 guns	3,430 long tons (3,490 t)	2 × screws, 2 × geared turbines, 26 knots (48 km/h; 30 mph)	June 1934	19 May 1935	Sold for private use, 1946; broken up, 1951
