= List of ship decommissionings in 1865 =

The list of ship decommissionings in 1865 is a chronological list of ships decommissioned in 1865. In cases where no official decommissioning ceremony was held, the date of withdrawal from service may be used instead. For ships lost at sea, see list of shipwrecks in 1865 instead.

Date	Operator	Ship	Pennant	Class and type	Fate and other notes
April	United States Navy	Tyler			Sold at a public auction on 17 August 1865
June 9	United States Navy	A. Houghton		Bark	Decommissioned at Philadelphia Navy Yard and sold at public auction on 10 August 1965
June 13	United States Navy	Sonoma			Sold on 1 October 1867
June 16	United States Navy	Saugus		Canonicus-class monitor	Laid up at Washington Navy Yard, Washington, District of Columbia until recommissioned in 1869
June 23	United States Navy	Cherokee			Sold to the Chilean Navy on 1 August 1865
June 24	United States Navy	Nantucket		Passaic-class monitor	Placed in reserve until recommissioned in 1882
June 28	United States Navy	Isonomia			Sold on 12 July 1865
June 30	United States Navy	Romeo			Sold on 17 August 1865
July 15	United States Navy	Iris			Transferred to the United States Lighthouse Service on 18 October 1865
July 29	United States Navy	Collier			Sold in 1865
July 31	United States Navy	Pocahontas			Sold on 30 November 1865
August 1	United States Navy	Avenger			Sold on 25 November 1865
August 4	United States Navy	Abeona			Sold on 11 August 1865
August 4	United States Navy	Mist			Sold on 17 August 1865
August 8	United States Navy	Preston			Sold on 30 August 1865
August 11	United States Navy	Nahant		Passaic-class monitor	Placed in reserve until recommissioned in 1898
August 28	United States Navy	Huntsville			Sold on 30 November 1865
September 9	United States Navy	State of Georgia			Sold on 25 October 1865
November 25	United States Navy	Passaic		Passaic-class monitor	Placed in reserve until recommissioned in 1876
December 15	United States Navy	Hornet			Sold in 1869
Unknown date	United States Navy	Montauk		Passaic-class monitor	Sold to Frank Samuel on 14 April 1904
Unknown date	French Navy	Bretagne			Used as a schoolship and gunnery trainer, then scrapped on 28 January 1880
Unknown date	Royal Navy	Weser		Nix-class aviso	Sold and scrapped on 29 October 1873
Unknown date	United States Navy	Banshee			Sold on 30 November 1865
