= SMS Salamander (1850) =

Aviso of the Prussian and later the British Royal Navy

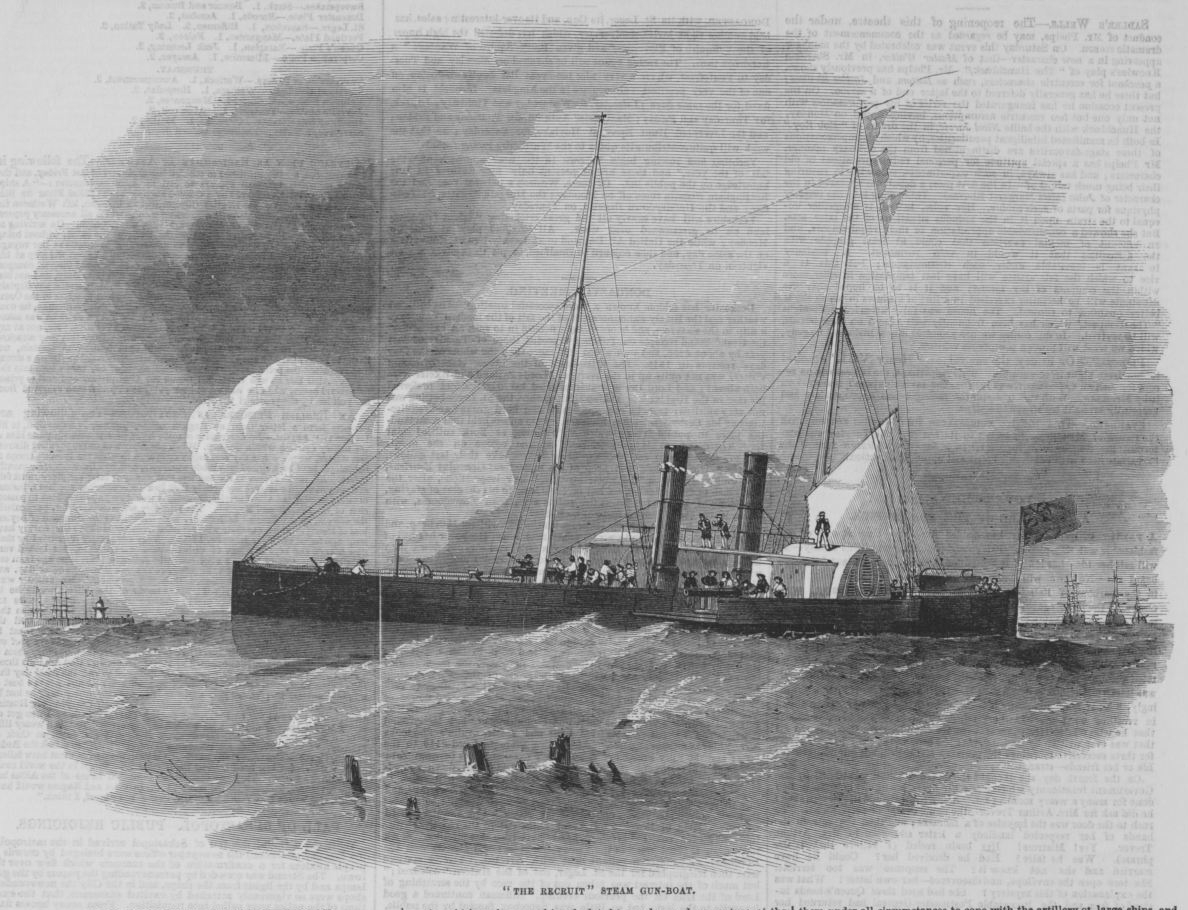
- Recruit in action at Taganrog on 3 June 1855, Illustrated London News. by Edwin Weedon

History

Prussia
- Name: Salamander
- Namesake: Salamander
- Builder: Robinson & Russell
- Laid down: 1850
- Launched: 1850
- Commissioned: 1 July 1851
- Fate: Sold to Britain, 12 January 1855

History

United Kingdom
- Name: Recruit
- Acquired: 12 January 1855
- Decommissioned: 1861
- Fate: Sold in January 1870

History

United Kingdom
- Name: Recruit
- Owner: Edward Bates & Co., Liverpool (1870–1874); Table Bay Dock & Breakwater Management Commission, Cape Town (from 1874)
- Acquired: January 1870
- Identification: Official Number 63244
- Fate: by 1878 a powder magazine

General characteristics
- Class & type: Nix-class aviso
- Displacement: Design: 389 t (383 long tons); Full load: 430 t (420 long tons)
- Length: 53.85 m (176 ft 8 in) o/a
- Beam: Hull: 7.2 m (23 ft 7 in); Paddle wheels: 12.4 m (40 ft 8 in)
- Draft: 2 m (6 ft 7 in)
- Installed power: 4 × boilers; 600 PS (592 ihp)
- Propulsion: 2 × marine steam engines; 2 × paddle wheels
- Speed: 13 kn (24 km/h; 15 mph)
- Range: 2,500 nmi (4,600 km; 2,900 mi) at 10 kn (19 km/h; 12 mph)
- Complement: 4 officers; 70 enlisted
- Armament: 4 × 25-pound mortars

SMS Salamander was the second and final member of the Nix class of avisos that were built for the Prussian Navy in the early 1850s. The ship saw little active use, apart from limited training exercises. In 1855, the ship was sold to the British Royal Navy in part exchange for the sail frigate Thetis and was commissioned as HMS Recruit. After entering service, she saw action in the Black Sea during the Crimean War, where she took part in operations against Russian logistics. The Royal Navy thereafter did not put the vessel to much use either, as she remained idle in Valletta, Malta, until late 1861, with the only events of note taking place in 1857 when she helped recover a gunboat and two merchant ships that had run aground in the region. Recruit was recalled to Britain in late 1861, thereafter remaining in reserve until 1869. In the 1870s she became a merchant ship, and was then used as a gunpowder magazine at Cape Town.

== Design ==
The Nix-class avisos were paddle steamers designed by the British naval architect John Scott Russell and Prince Adalbert of Prussia in 1849. They were authorized in 1850 as part of a program to strengthen the small Prussian Navy during the First Schleswig War; they were ordered from Russell's firm, Robinson & Russell, along with the larger paddle steamer Danzig, which was to be built under British supervision in Prussia.

Salamander was 53.85 m (176 ft 8 in) long overall, with a beam of 7.2 m (23 ft 7 in) over the hull and 12.4 m (40 ft 8 in) over the paddle wheels. With a design displacement of 389 t (383 long tons) and a full-load displacement of 430 t (420 long tons), she had a draft of 2 m (6 ft 7 in). She was propelled by a pair of single-expansion marine steam engines that turned a pair of paddle wheels, one on either side of the hull amidships. Steam for the engines was provided by four boilers, which were ducted into two funnels. Her propulsion system was rated at 600 PS (592 ihp) for a top speed of 13 knots (24 km/h; 15 mph). At a speed of 10 knots (19 km/h; 12 mph), she could steam for 2,500 nautical miles (4,600 km; 2,900 mi). Her crew consisted of approximately four officers and seventy enlisted men. She carried an armament of four 25-pound mortars.

== Service history ==
=== SMS Salamander ===
The keel for Salamander, named after the amphibian, was laid down in 1850 and she was launched later that year. When it became clear that both she and her sister ship Nix could not be completed before Prussia's Baltic Sea ports iced over for the winter of 1850–1851, the shipyard and the Prussian Navy agreed that work on Nix should be temporarily halted to allow the workers to focus on Salamander to have her ready in time. Initial sea trials began in December 1850 under the supervision of Kommodore (Commodore) Jan Schröder. These tests were completed to Schröder's satisfaction by 16 December, and the next day the British shipyard crew took the ship to Swinemünde, which she reached on 31 December. A dispute between the Prussian customs department and the Ministry of War over the import duty was eventually settled by the ministry paying duties only on the armament and stores. In mid-January 1851, the ship was taken to the naval depot in Stettin, where she was placed in reserve and the British crew returned home.

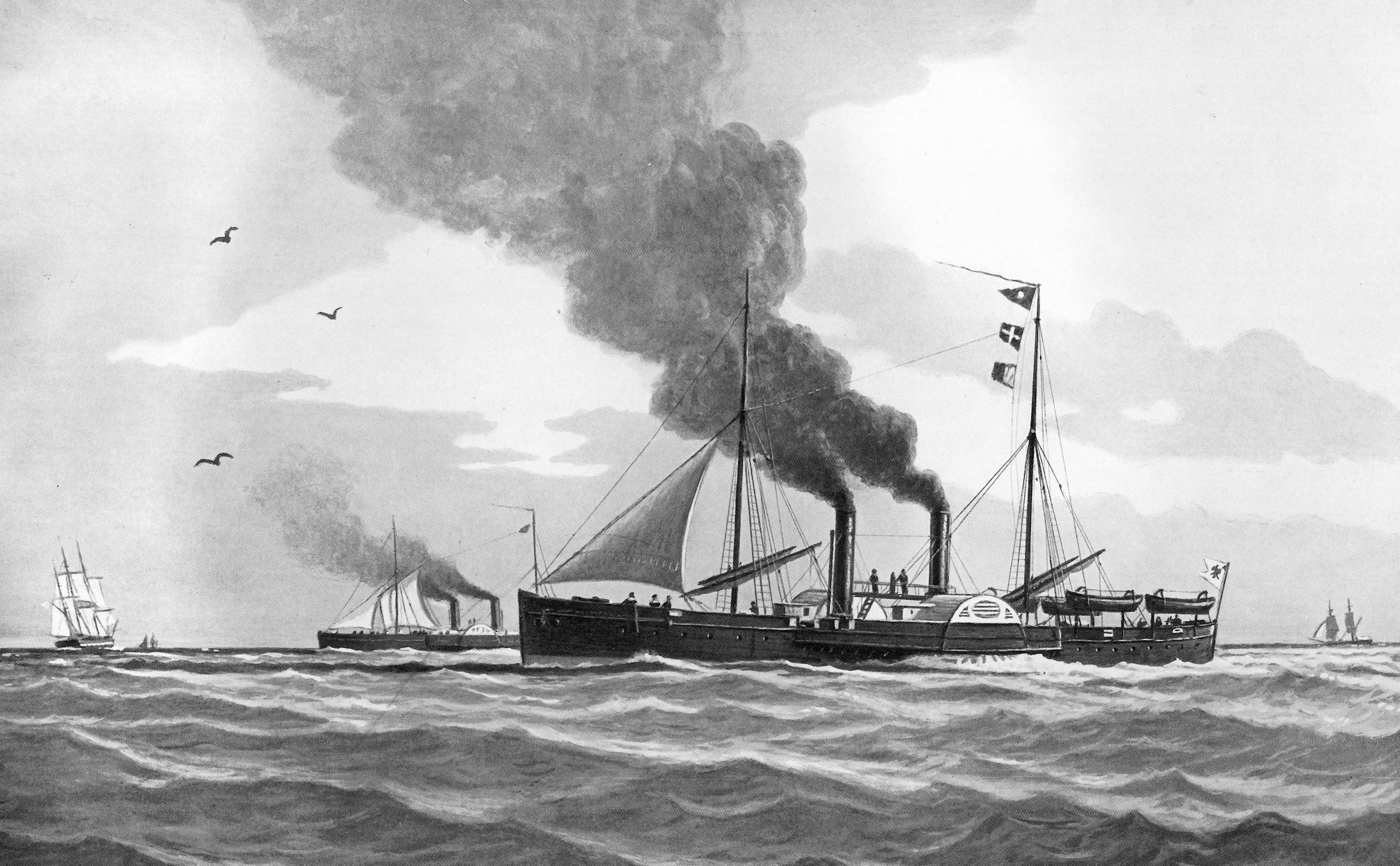
1905 painting of Salamander and Nix by Lüder Arenhold

In late April 1851, Salamander was reactivated to tow her sister Nix, which had run aground in the mouth of the Oder river outside Stettin. The ship was formally commissioned into the fleet on 1 July to begin training exercises that were observed by Prince Adalbert. On 28 July, she embarked King Friedrich Wilhelm IV for a voyage from Swinemünde to Königsberg. The ship was decommissioned in Stettin in mid-September. She was transferred to the newly established naval depot on the island of Dänholm, but she remained out of service for the year. She next saw active service on 11 June 1853, for the purpose of taking the ship to Karlskrona, Sweden, for an overhaul. She took part in training maneuvers later that year and she carried Friedrich Wilhelm IV to the island of Rügen, but on 17 September she had to return to port after an outbreak of cholera among her crew. She remained laid up through May 1854, only to move the ship to Danzig.

Salamander recommissioned for the last time under the Prussian flag on 22 October 1854, to be taken to Britain, where she and Nix were to be exchanged for the British frigate Thetis. The poor reputation of the vessels, in large part a result of repeated boiler-related fires aboard Nix, led the naval command to decide to sell the two Nix-class ships. The Prussian Navy initially sought to trade them for a pair of small corvettes from the British Royal Navy, one of which was to have been HMS Terpsichore. After negotiations, an agreement was reached to transfer the ships to the British in exchange for Thetis, as the British were in need of small, fast steamers for use during the Crimean War.

In early November, Nix and Salamander left Danzig and on the 23rd, they stopped in Jade Bay to take part in celebrations marking the founding of the naval base at Wilhelmshaven. Two days later, they resumed their voyage to Britain, but the Hannoverian government initially refused to grant permission for the vessels to enter Bremen on the Weser to take on coal for the trip across the North Sea and shelter in the port to avoid bad weather. After the Prussian representative in Hannover pressured the government, they were finally allowed entry on 1 December. They remained there until 11 December, but a severe storm prevented them from leaving the Weser estuary for three days.

=== HMS Recruit ===
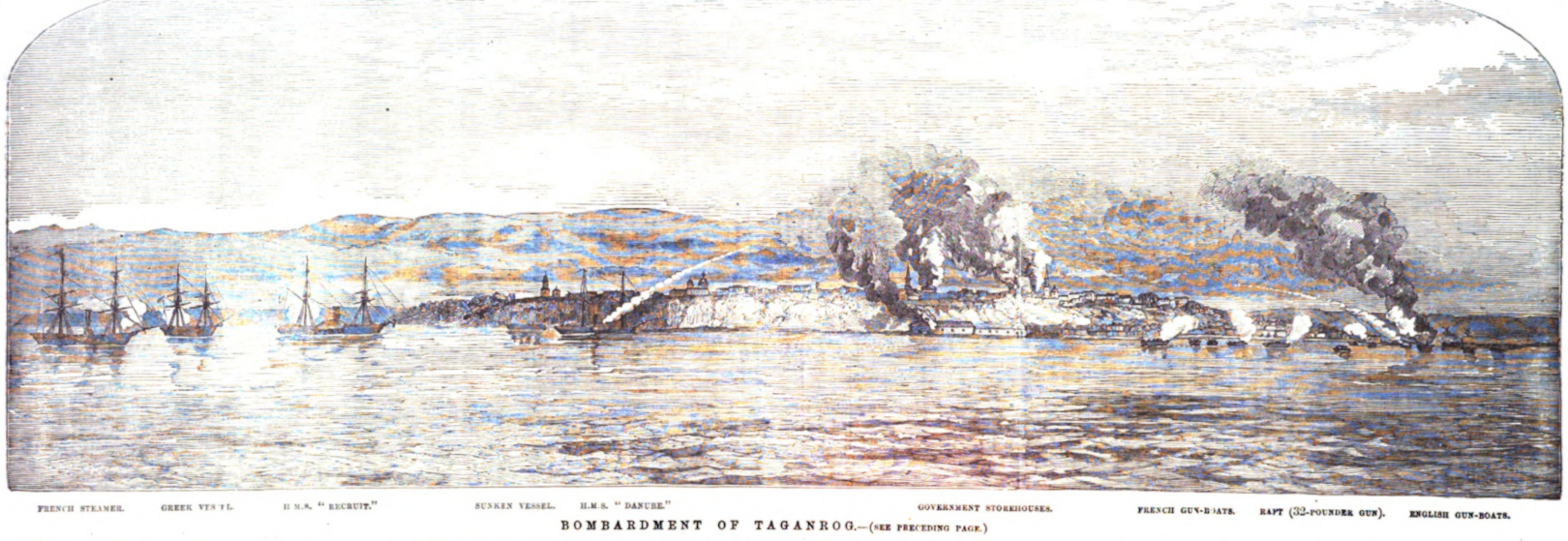
Recruit third from left at the bombardment of Taganrog, 21 June 1855

On 12 January 1855, the ship was formally transferred to British control. Renamed HMS Recruit, the ship was overhauled and in March was sent to the Mediterranean Fleet. There, she joined the Anglo-French fleet that operated in the Black Sea during the Crimean War. On 25 May, she and several other vessels entered the Sea of Azov for operations there. Over the course of the next four days, they captured or destroyed some 245 vessels carrying supplies for Russian forces in the Crimea. The ships also destroyed supply stockpiles at Berdiansk, Genitchi, and Taganrog.

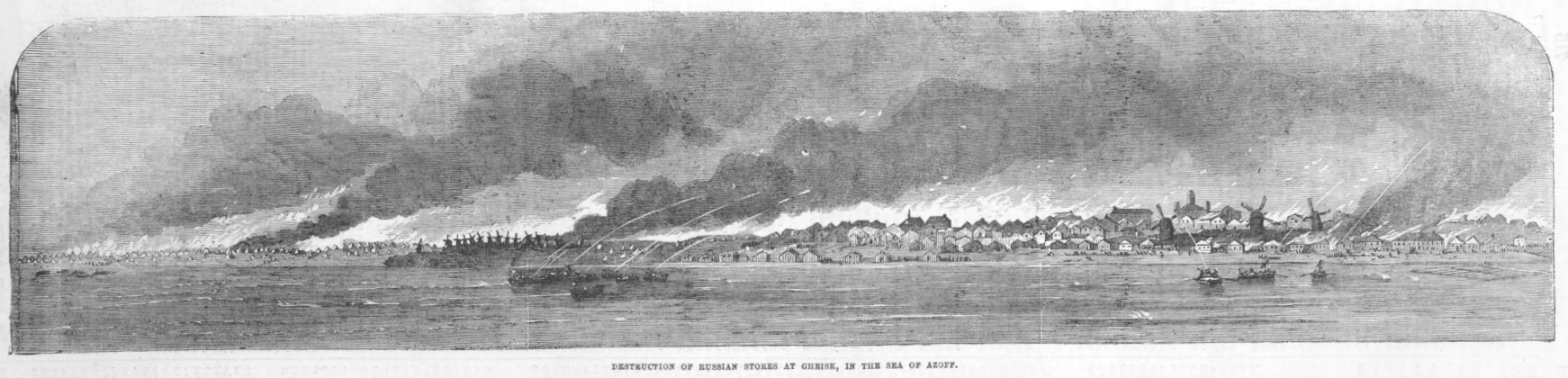
She attended the destruction of Russian stores at Gheisk, in the Sea of Azov, 5 November 1855, Illustrated London News

She was stationed in Valletta, Malta, where she remained idle through October 1861. During this period, she assisted with the recovery of the gunboat HMS Cracker in January 1857, which had broken free from her anchors and ran aground. That August, she assisted in refloating the British ship Gazelle, which had been driven ashore near Patras, Greece. On 12 December, she assisted in the refloating of the British ship Cynthia, which had run aground at Missolonghi, Greece. She was ordered to return to Chatham Dockyard for a thorough overhaul in October 1861, but on arrival she was instead simply laid up at the Sheerness Dockyard until her sale.

=== Sale and further service ===
On 23 September 1869 Recruit was offered for sale at auction but found no buyer. In January 1870 she was successfully sold to Edward Bates of Liverpool, who registered her there as the merchant ship Recruit with Official Number 63244. In April that year the ship was sent to South America via Lisbon and eventually arrived in the River Plate at Montevideo in November. The ship was later at Cape Town, where she was registered in 1874 as owned by the Table Bay Dock & Breakwater Management Commission and, by 1878, was in use as a powder magazine.
