= SMS Nix =

Aviso of the Prussian and later British Royal Navy

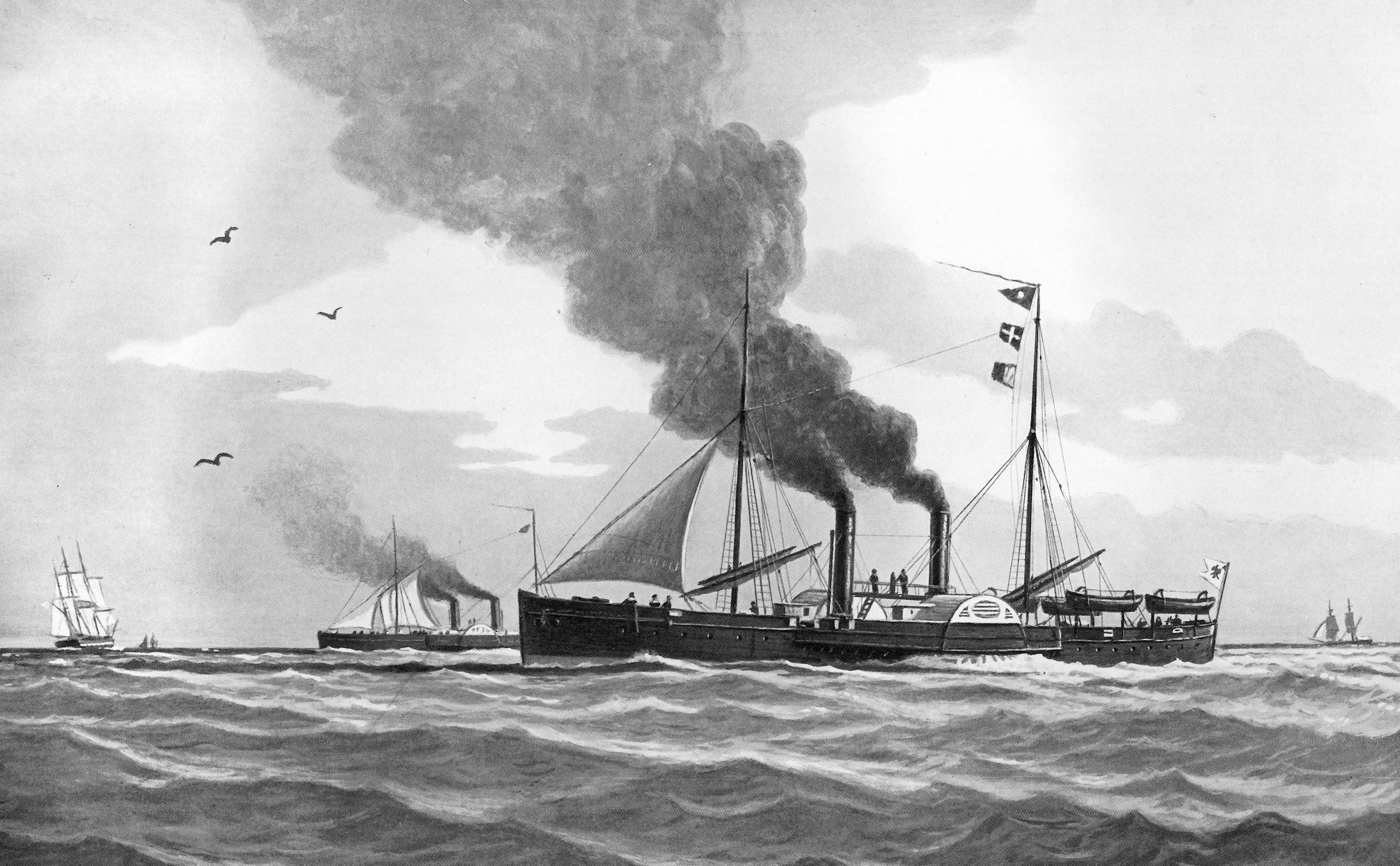
- 1905 painting of Nix and Salamander by Lüder Arenhold

History

Prussia
- Name: Nix
- Namesake: Nix
- Builder: Robinson & Russell
- Laid down: 1850
- Launched: 1850
- Commissioned: 29 July 1851
- Fate: Sold to Britain, 12 January 1855

History

United Kingdom
- Name: Weser
- Acquired: 12 January 1855
- Decommissioned: 1865
- Fate: Sold, 29 October 1873, broken up

General characteristics
- Class & type: Nix-class aviso
- Displacement: Design: 389 t (383 long tons); Full load: 430 t (420 long tons)
- Length: 53.85 m (176 ft 8 in) o/a
- Beam: Hull: 7.2 m (23 ft 7 in); Paddle wheels: 12.4 m (40 ft 8 in)
- Draft: 2 m (6 ft 7 in)
- Installed power: 4 × boilers; 600 PS (592 ihp)
- Propulsion: 2 × marine steam engines; 2 × paddle wheels
- Speed: 13 kn (24 km/h; 15 mph)
- Range: 2,500 nmi (4,600 km; 2,900 mi) at 10 kn (19 km/h; 12 mph)
- Complement: 4 officers; 70 enlisted
- Armament: 4 × 25-pound mortars

SMS Nix was the lead ship of the two-vessel Nix class of avisos built for the Prussian Navy in the early 1850s. After commissioning in 1851, Nix saw little activity, apart from short training exercises and cruises in the Baltic Sea, which were frequently punctuated with boiler fires. A dissatisfied Prussian Navy decided to sell both Nix-class ships. In 1855, the Prussians sold Nix to the British Royal Navy in exchange for the sail frigate Thetis, and was commissioned as HMS Weser. She saw action during the Crimean War at the Battle of Kinburn in October 1855, and thereafter saw little activity, being based in Malta. She was ultimately decommissioned in 1865, used as a harbor ship, and then sold to ship breakers in 1873.

== Design ==
The Nix-class avisos were paddle steamers designed by the British naval architect John Scott Russell and Prince Adalbert of Prussia in 1849. They were authorized in 1850 as part of a program to strengthen the small Prussian Navy during the First Schleswig War; they were ordered from Russell's firm, Robinson & Russell, along with the larger paddle steamer Danzig, which was to be built under British supervision in Prussia.

Nix was 53.85 m (176 ft 8 in) long overall, with a beam of 7.2 m (23 ft 7 in) over the hull and 12.4 m (40 ft 8 in) over the paddle wheels. With a design displacement of 389 t (383 long tons) and a full-load displacement of 430 t (420 long tons), she had a draft of 2 m (6 ft 7 in). She was propelled by a pair of single-expansion marine steam engines that turned a pair of paddle wheels, one on either side of the hull amidships. Steam for the engines was provided by four boilers, which were ducted into two funnels. Her propulsion system was rated at 600 PS (592 ihp) for a top speed of 13 knots (24 km/h; 15 mph). At a speed of 10 knots (19 km/h; 12 mph), she could steam for 2,500 nautical miles (4,600 km; 2,900 mi). Her crew consisted of approximately four officers and seventy enlisted men. She carried an armament of four 25-pound mortars.

== Service history ==
Nix was laid down in 1850 and was launched later that year. The builders had originally planned to have the ship finished before Prussia's harbors on its Baltic coast froze over for the winter of 1850–1851, but delays prevented this, so the builders slowed work on Nix to allocate workers to her sister ship Salamander. In March 1851, the ship's first commander, Kapitänleutnant Schirmacher, and crew traveled to London to be trained during the vessel's sea trials. Since the Prussian Navy lacked experienced engineers, a British machinist was hired to supervise the ship's engine room crew. Nix left London to travel to Prussia in mid-April, but the inexperienced crew caused one of the boilers to catch fire, while another sprang a leak. As she entered the Oder river, the ship ran aground owing to a mistake by the pilot. Salamander arrived thereafter and pulled her free. Nix then steamed to the naval depot in Stettin, where she was withdrawn from service for repairs. During this period, the crew conducted further training and the ship's guns were installed. Nix was formally commissioned on 29 July. She was named after the nix of German folklore.

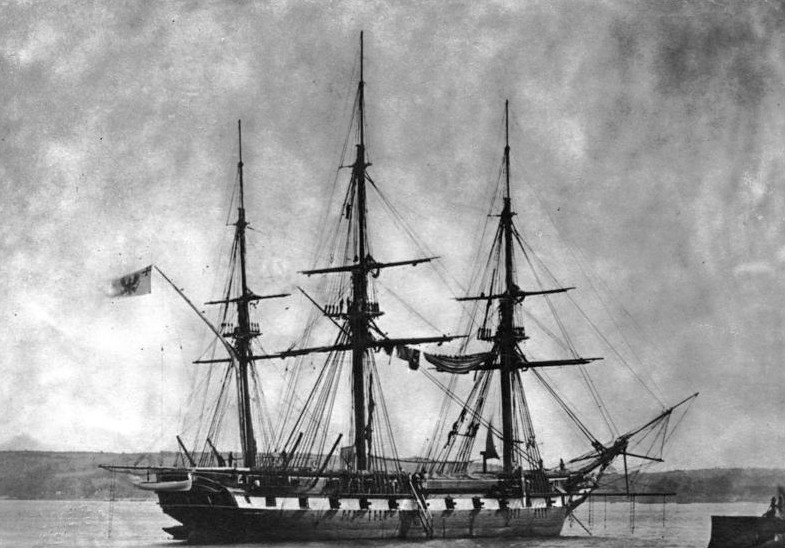
Thetis, the frigate secured by the sale of Nix and Salamander

After entering service, the ship embarked on training exercises, the first one of which saw Adalbert come aboard for a cruise to Danzig. By the end of August, she had been joined in Danzig Bay by the frigate Mercur. She thereafter carried Prince Karl of Prussia to Kronstadt, Russia. These early operations were marked by a number of accidents, frequently boiler fires related to the wooden stokeholds. By September, she had arrived in Stralsund, where she was decommissioned. The ship saw little activity in 1852, apart from carrying King Friedrich Wilhelm IV between Stralsund, Putbus and Danzig. She also went to Karlskrona, Sweden for an overhaul that year. She remained out of service for the duration of 1853. In May 1854, she was recommissioned and on 26 June she embarked the 1st Company, Seebataillon (naval battalion) from Stettin and carried them to Danzig. Friedrich Wilhelm IV and Prince Karl boarded the ship once again in July for a visit to Kronstadt that ended in September. Nix thereafter underwent repairs in Danzig.

The poor reputation of the vessels, in large part a result of the repeated fires, led the naval command to decide to sell the two Nix-class ships. The Prussian Navy initially sought to trade them for a pair of small corvettes from the British Royal Navy, one of which was to have been HMS Terpsichore. After negotiations, an agreement was reached to transfer the ships to the British in exchange for the sail frigate Thetis in late 1854, as the British were in need of small, fast steamers for use during the Crimean War. In early November, Nix and Salamander left Danzig and on the 23rd, they stopped in Jade Bay to take part in celebrations marking the founding of the naval base at Wilhelmshaven. Two days later, they resumed their voyage to Britain, but the Hannoverian government initially refused to grant permission for the vessels to enter Bremen on the Weser to take on coal for the trip across the North Sea and shelter in the port to avoid bad weather. After the Prussian representative in Hannover pressured the government, they were finally allowed entry on 1 December. They remained there until 11 December, but a severe storm prevented them from leaving the Weser estuary for three days. While en route, further storms caused the two ships to become separated, and Nix arrived in Devonport on 19 December. On 12 January 1855, the ship was formally transferred to British control.

=== British service ===
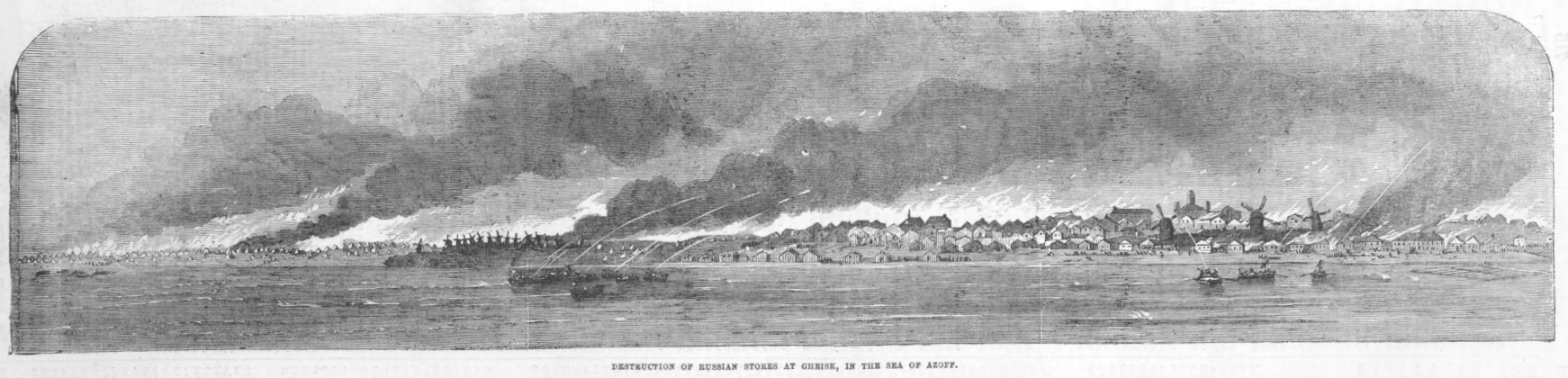
Weser attended the destruction of Russian stores at Gheisk, in the Sea of Azov, 5 November 1855, Illustrated London News

The Royal Navy renamed the ship Weser and sent her to the Devonport shipyard for an overhaul, after which she was sent to the Mediterranean Sea in March. Her commander at that time was John Edmund Commerell; while operating in the Black Sea, Weser once again caught fire while steaming off Constantinople and Commerell ran the ship aground. After the fire was suppressed, the ship was towed off and later joined the siege of Sevastopol in June. On the night of 16 June, she joined several other vessels—HMS Tribune, Highflyer, Terrible, Miranda, Niger, Arrow, Viper, and Snake—for a night bombardment of the Russian positions defending the city. Weser later entered the Sea of Azov and on 11 October, Commerell, William Thomas Rickard (the ship's quartermaster), and a seaman went ashore to burn Russian stores. Commerell and Rickard were both awarded the Victoria Cross for their actions. She joined the fleet that attacked Kinburn on 17 October that resulted in the Battle of Kinburn.

After the war, Weser was stationed in Malta, and in early 1859, she returned to Britain for a major overhaul at the Woolwich Arsenal, carried out between 1 May 1859 and May 1861. She thereafter returned to the Mediterranean before being decommissioned at Malta in 1865. She was employed there as a harbor ship until 1873, when she was sold for scrap on 29 October and subsequently broken up.
