= Nix-class aviso =

Aviso class of the Prussian Navy and later the British Royal Navy

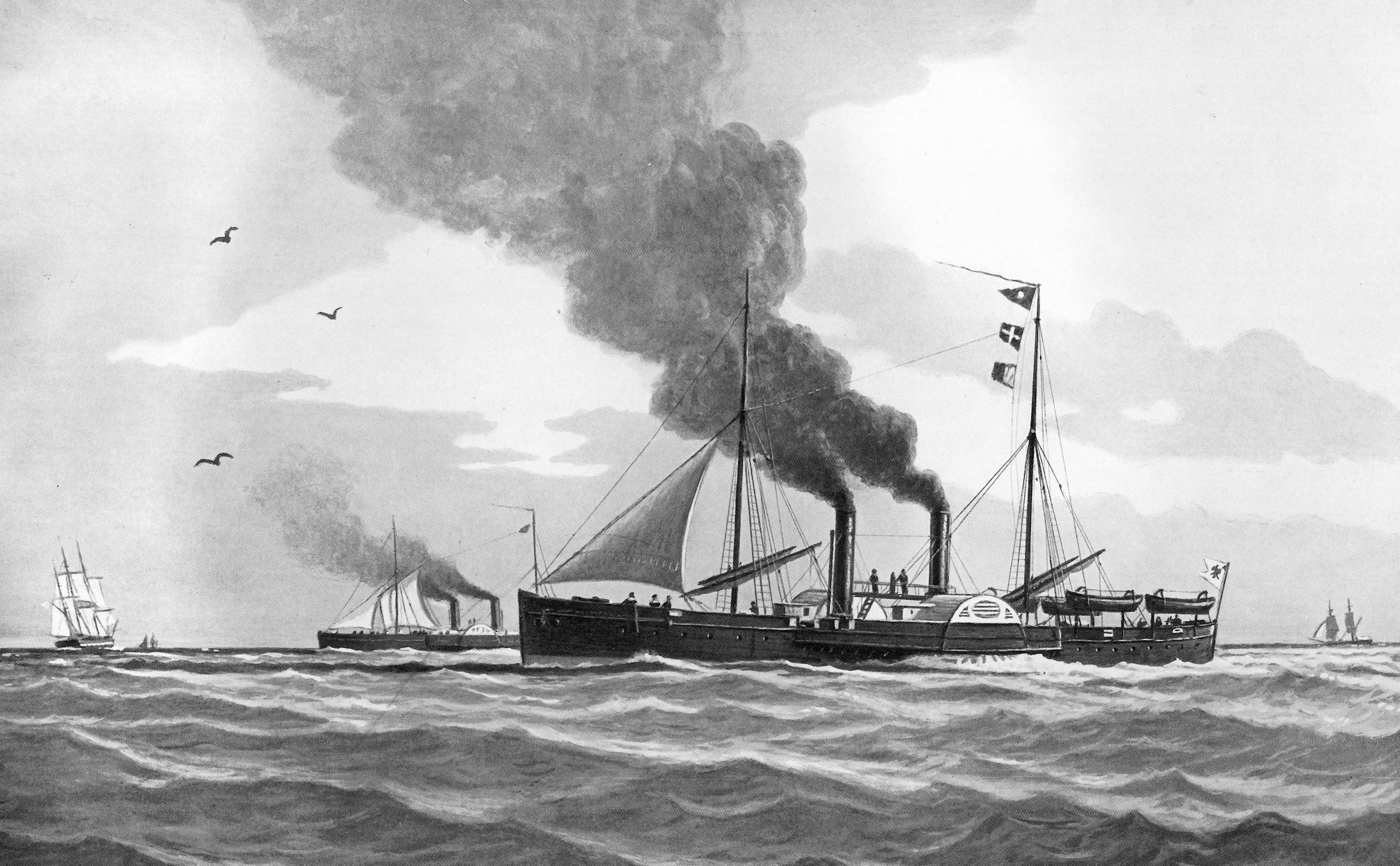
- 1905 painting of Nix and Salamander by Lüder Arenhold

Class overview
- Builders: Robinson & Russell
- Operators: Prussian Navy; Royal Navy
- Preceded by: SMS Preussischer Adler
- Succeeded by: SMS Grille
- Built: 1850–1851
- In service: 1851–1865
- Completed: 2
- Retired: 2

General characteristics
- Type: Paddle steamer aviso
- Displacement: Design: 389 t (383 long tons); Full load: 430 t (420 long tons)
- Length: 53.85 m (176 ft 8 in) o/a
- Beam: Hull: 7.2 m (23 ft 7 in); Paddle wheels: 12.4 m (40 ft 8 in)
- Draft: 2 m (6 ft 7 in)
- Installed power: 4 × boilers; 600 PS (592 ihp)
- Propulsion: 2 × marine steam engines; 2 × paddle wheels
- Speed: 13 kn (24 km/h; 15 mph)
- Range: 2,500 nmi (4,600 km; 2,900 mi) at 10 kn (19 km/h; 12 mph)
- Complement: 4 officers; 70 enlisted
- Armament: 4 × 25-pound mortars

The Nix class was a pair of avisos built for the Prussian Navy in the early 1850s. The class comprised two ships: SMS Nix and Salamander. They were ordered as part of a modest program to strengthen the fleet at the urging of Prince Adalbert of Prussia in the immediate aftermath of the First Schleswig War, which had demonstrated that the weak fleet could not challenge the ability of Denmark to impose a blockade of Prussian and German ports. They were small vessels with a shallow draft, since they were intended to operate close to shore to defend Prussia's coast. Neither vessel saw significant service in the Prussian Navy before being sold to the British Royal Navy in exchange for the frigate Thetis in 1855. They were renamed Weser and Recruit, respectively, and the former saw action during the Crimean War in the Black Sea later in 1855. The two ships saw little activity after their sale to Britain, with Recruit being laid up in 1861 and Weser following in 1865. Recruit was sold for merchant service in 1870, while Weser was discarded in 1873.

== Design ==
During the initial stage of the First Schleswig War in 1848, it had become clear to Prince Adalbert of Prussia that the small Prussian Navy was powerless against the significantly larger Danish Navy, which led him to press for increased naval spending. The Danish blockade had forced the Prussian government to requisition packet steamers like Preussischer Adler to defend German merchant traffic. With the demobilization following a truce in August 1848, the navy relinquished the civilian vessels, but Adalbert continued to push for a strengthened fleet.

Adalbert initially conceived of flat-bottomed steam gun boats that could operate in shallow coastal waters. He submitted design requests to the German shipyards Klawitter and Devrient and the British firm Robinson & Russell; the latter had more experience than the German builders, so Adalbert awarded the contract to Robinson & Russell. Adalbert and the British naval architect John Scott Russell agreed on building a pair of small avisos with iron hulls. The hull lines should allow the vessels to steam either ahead or astern, with a rudder at either end to control steering in both directions. Design work on the paddle steamers was completed in 1849, and they were authorized in 1850; payment was made in March and King Friedrich Wilhelm IV approved the names Nix and Salamander, which had been suggested by Adalbert. The contract signed with Robinson & Russell also included British assistance with the construction of the larger paddle steamer Danzig in Prussia.

=== Characteristics ===
The Nix class ships were 53.05 m (174 ft 1 in) long at the waterline and 53.85 m (176 ft 8 in) long overall, with a beam of 7.2 m (23 ft 7 in) over the hull and 12.4 m (40 ft 8 in) over the paddle wheels. With a design displacement of 389 t (383 long tons) and a full-load displacement of 430 t (420 long tons), they had a draft of 2 m (6 ft 7 in). The very shallow draft was designed to allow the vessels to cruise in the shallow waters along Prussia's coast. Their iron hulls incorporated transverse iron frames and wooden decks. The hulls were divided into thirteen watertight compartments and had a double bottom that ran for their entire length.

The ships were propelled by a pair of 2-cylinder single-expansion marine steam engines that turned a pair of paddle wheels, one on either side of the hull amidships. The paddle wheels each had fourteen paddles and they were 5 m (16 ft) in diameter. Steam for the engines was provided by four boilers, which were ducted into two funnels. The boilers were divided into two boiler rooms, one forward of the engine room and the other aft. Their propulsion system was rated at 600 metric horsepower (592 ihp) for a top speed of 13 knots (24 km/h; 15 mph). At a speed of 10 knots (19 km/h; 12 mph), they could steam for 2,500 nautical miles (4,600 km; 2,900 mi). To supplement the steam engines, the ships carried a sailing rig that consisted of two masts, each fitted with a square topsail and a lower lug sail, along with a forward staysail. The total sail area was about 350 m^{2} (3,800 sq ft). As a measure of protection for the propulsion machinery, the coal bunkers were arranged abreast of the engine and boiler rooms, and it was thought that the iron hull would also increase the vessels' resistance to damage.

Their crew consisted of approximately four officers and seventy enlisted men. The ships carried four small boats of unrecorded type. Steering was controlled by a pair of rudders, one at the stern and one in the bow; both could be fixed. Nix and Salamander were good sea boats, but they had a wide turning radius and could not be steered at all while under sail. They carried an armament of four 25-pound mortars. The design initially called for four short-barrelled 12-pounder guns in addition to the mortars, but these were never installed.

== Ships ==
Construction data
Ship	Builder	Laid down	Launched	Completed
Nix	Robinson & Russell	1850	1850	29 July 1851
Salamander	Robinson & Russell	1850	1850	1 July 1851

== Service history ==
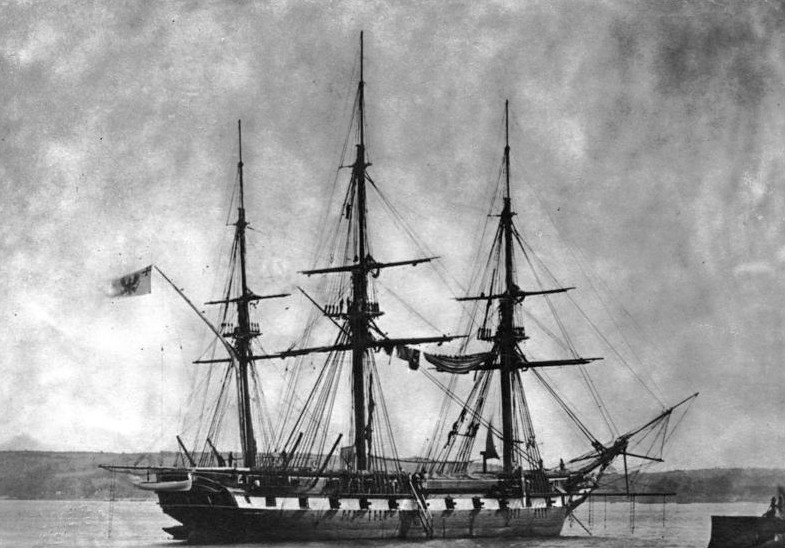
Thetis, the frigate secured by the sale of Nix and Salamander

Salamander was completed first, beginning sea trials in December 1850 and making the voyage across the North Sea at the end of the month, being decommissioned in Stettin in January 1851. While in reserve there, she was reactivated in April 1851 to pull Nix free after she ran aground in the mouth of the Oder river. Their Prussian careers were short, owing to a combination of the unfamiliarity of their crews with steamships and a series of boiler-related fires aboard Nix that resulted from flaws in her design (most significantly the fact that their stokeholds were wooden). The ships took part in limited training exercises and took members of the Prussian nobility, including Prince Adalbert and King Friedrich Wilhelm IV on cruises in the Baltic. They spent the bulk of their time under the Prussian flag in reserve, however. In June 1853, during one of her few periods of active service, Salamander had to be withdrawn from service due to an outbreak of cholera among her crew.

By late 1854, the Prussian Navy was convinced that the ships were of no use to them, and they arranged a trade with the British Royal Navy to secure the sail frigate Thetis. The two avisos left Danzig in November, and while on the way to Britain, stopped in the Jade Bay to participate in the ceremonial founding of the city and naval base at Wilhelmshaven. They later caused a minor diplomatic incident with the Kingdom of Hannover over the country's initial refusal to allow the vessels to enter Bremen and take on coal for the voyage to Britain. On arriving in Britain, they were transferred to Royal Navy control on 12 January 1855.

Nix and Salamander were renamed Weser and Recruit, respectively, and both were sent to the Mediterranean Sea after a brief refit. Weser saw action against Russian forces during the Crimean War later that year; on 11 October, John Edmund Commerell and William Thomas Rickard—her commander and quartermaster—staged a raid in the Sea of Azov that earned them the Victoria Cross. The ship took part in the Battle of Kinburn on 17 October. Neither ship saw significant activity with the British fleet afterward, with both being kept idle at Valletta, Malta, for the next several years. Weser was refitted in 1859–1861, but saw no significant service before being decommissioned in 1865 and then sold to ship breakers in 1873. Recruit, meanwhile, was laid up in 1861. The ship was sold for merchant service in 1870 and by 1878 was a powder magazine at Cape Town.
