= Nathaniel Fenner =

Nathaniel John Fenner (31 May 1824 – 28 November 1888) was a British oil merchant who owned a wharf in Millwall on the Isle of Dogs, London. Along with Robert Fairlie, he came up with the idea of developing the Millwall Docks. He first asked Fairlie to draw up a plan to develop the empty land behind his wharf.

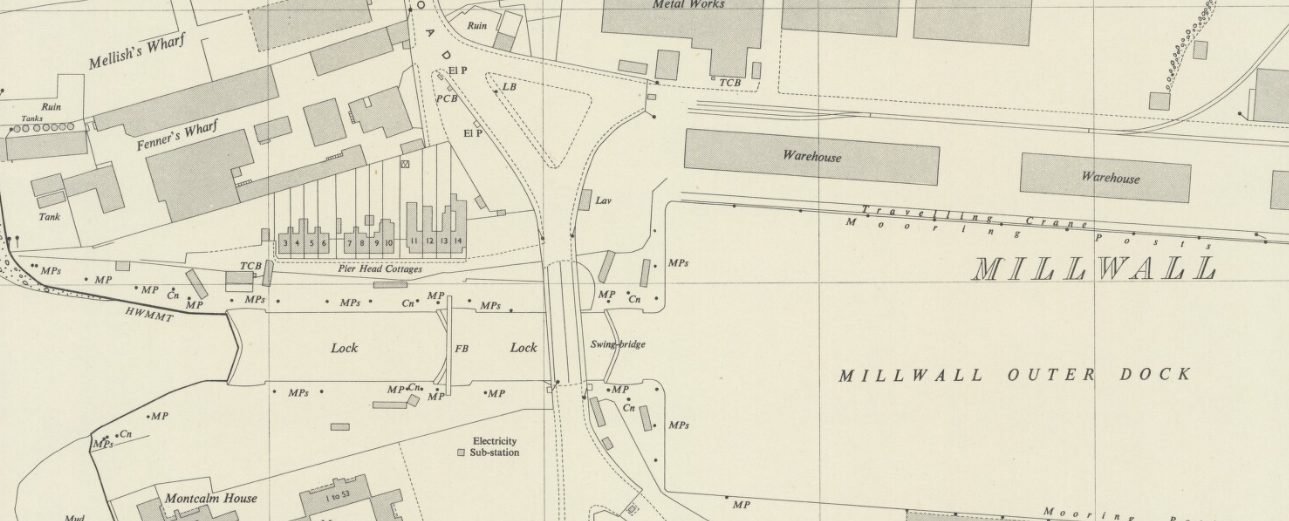
1949 map showing Fenner's Wharf in relation to the Millwall outer Dock

In 1856, with Henry James Fenner, Nathaniel had taken out a lease on a plot of undeveloped land which had previously been used as a garden and paddock, in Southern Millwall. Here they erected a two-storey warehouse. Having experienced difficulty when attempting to land cargoes at low tide, Fenner hit on the idea of an enclosed non-tidal docks for wharfingers created by building a 'canal' across the Isle of Dogs provided with entrance basins at each end and a central arm which would extend north towards the East and West India Dock Company's Timber Pond.

Following the insolvency of the Millwall Iron Works, Ship Building and Graving Docks Company, the Fenner's took over the Nast House, which that company had previously occupied. From 1877 they used this premises for storing barrels of petroleum. They converted the Mast House, and erected brick internal walls. Also they sank a large pit where the Mast Pond had been, where they stored more barrels of petroleum.

In 1888, Fenner died suddenly while aboard a steamer crossing the Black Sea.
