= Foleys Island =

Island in Michigan

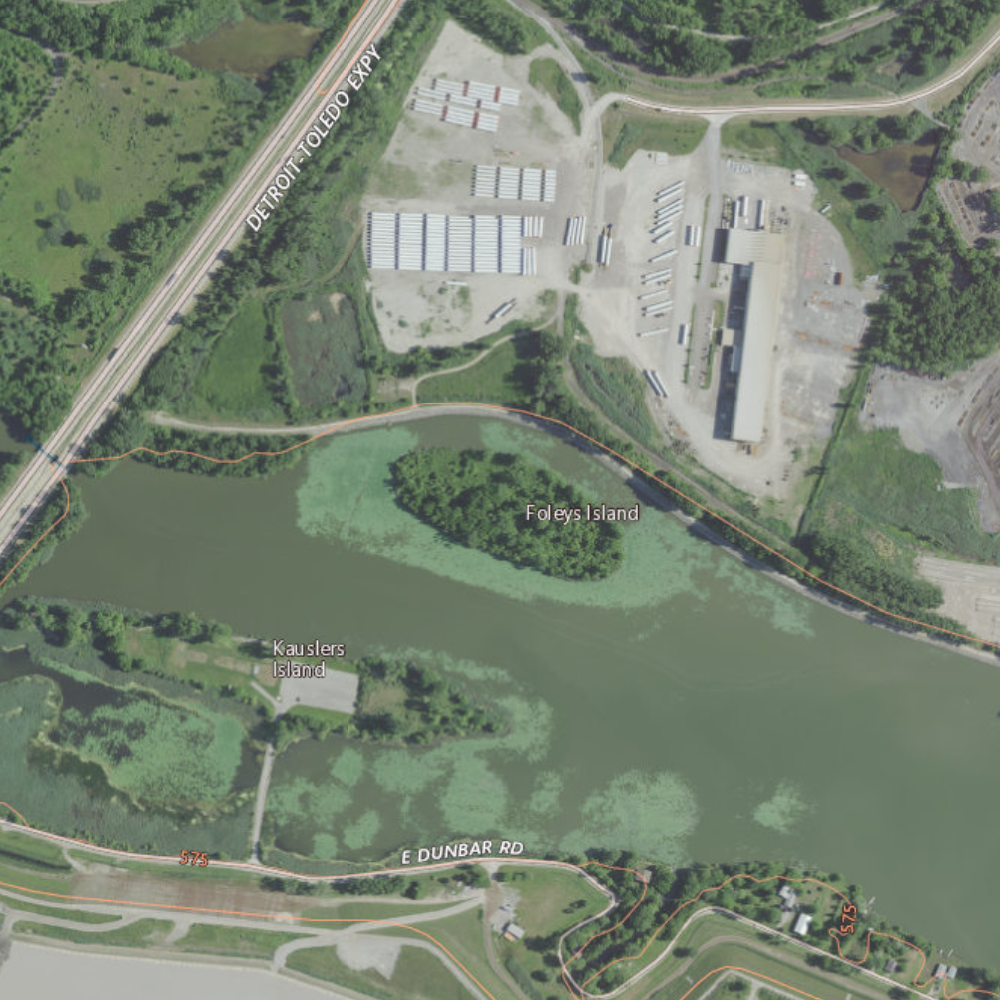
- USGS aerial imagery of Foleys Island

- Location within Michigan Location within the United States

Geography
- Location: Southeast Michigan
- Coordinates: 41°53′34″N 83°22′22″W
- Adjacent to: Lake Erie
- Highest elevation: 577 ft (175.9 m)

Administration
- United States
- State: Michigan
- County: Monroe

Foleys Island is an island in Plum Creek, near Lake Erie. It is in Monroe County, Michigan. Its coordinates are 41°53′34″N 83°22′22″W, and the United States Geological Survey gives its elevation as 577 ft (176 m).

== See also ==
- Kauslers Island
- Smiths Island
