= List of shipwrecks in 1865 =

The list of shipwrecks in 1865 includes ships sunk, foundered, grounded, or otherwise lost during 1865.

table of contents
1865
| Jan | Feb | Mar | Apr |
| May | Jun | Jul | Aug |
| Sep | Oct | Nov | Dec |
Unknown date

== Unknown date ==
List of shipwrecks: unknown date in 1865
| Ship | State | Description |
|---|---|---|
| Alida | United States | The 35-ton sidewheel paddle steamer burned. |
| Au Revoir | United Kingdom | The schooner ran aground at Waikato Heads, New Zealand. |
| Belle Peoria | United States | The sidewheel paddle steamer was wrecked by ice in the Missouri River in the spring of 1865 in an area that later became known as the Peoria Bottoms. |
| Canada | United Kingdom | The barque was wrecked in the South China Sea. Some of her crew reached Sarawak, Malaya in a boat, the rest were rescued by the barque Patriot (Bremen). |
| C. Matthews | Flag unknown | The schooner was lost in the vicinity of Manasquan, New Jersey. |
| Carrier Dove | United States | During a voyage from Shields, County Durham, United King, to New York, the clipper ran aground on Governors Island in New York Harbor. After lighters took her cargo to the wharves in New York, she was refloated, repaired, and returned to service. |
| Catherine | Flag unknown | American Civil War, Union blockade: During an attempt to run the Union blockade, the schooner was stranded at Sabine Pass on the border between Louisiana and Texas, Confederate States of America sometime during the American Civil War. |
| Celeste | United States | The 79-ton sternwheel paddle steamer struck a snag and sank at Duvall's Bluff, Arkansas, in March or April 1865. |
| Cochief | United States | The 69-ton schooner was wrecked on Fish Rock at Point Arena, California, on either 30 January 1863 or 30 January 1865. |
| Comet | United States | The 496-ton sidewheel paddle steamer struck a snag and sank in the Ocmulgee River at Hawkinsville, Georgia, either in November or on 2 December. |
| Convoy | United States Army | The quartermasters vessel caught fire at Barrancas Wharf. She was cut lose and drifted in Pensacola Bay, Florida where she sank 1–1 1/2 miles (1.6–2.4 km) off the Pensacola Lighthouse at the Pensacola Navy Yard some time in Fall 1865. |
| David Cavanaugh | United States | The 169-ton screw steamer vanished in early 1865, probably in the Atlantic Ocean. |
| Decatur | Flag unknown | The full-rigged ship was lost off Grays Harbor on the coast of Washington Territory. |
| Deer Lodge | United States | The sternwheel paddle steamer struck a snag and sank in the Missouri River 12 miles (19 km) downstream of St. Joseph, Missouri. She later was refloated. |
| Dr. Kane | United States | The 191-ton sternwheel paddle steamer struck a snag and sank in deep water in the Ohio River 300 yards (270 m) below the public wharf at Cairo, Illinois, sometime during the American Civil War. |
| Dove | (United Kingdom of Great Britain and Ireland) New Zealand | The 25-ton schooner sailed for Hokitika from Nelson in late 1865. She, her crew of four, and two passengers, were never seen again. |
| Elfin Queen | (United Kingdom of Great Britain and Ireland) New Zealand | The hulk of the cutter was found drifting close to the entrance of Manukau Harbour in early October. Wreckage of the ship was also found along local beaches. The ship, with a crew of five, had left Auckland for Wellington in early September. |
| Emilie No. 2 | United States | The sidewheel paddle steamer was wrecked by wind on the Missouri River at St. Joseph, Missouri, then floated downstream and sank at Atchison, Kansas. |
| Ernestine | United Kingdom | The ship ran aground in the Torres Strait. She was later refloated and taken in to Calcutta, India. |
| Etta | Confederate States of America | The schooner was lost in the North Atlantic Ocean off Cape Hatteras, North Carolina. |
| Fatty-ool-aziz | India | The East Indiaman sank in the Hooghly River. |
| Flamingo | Confederate States of America | American Civil War, Union blockade: The sidewheel paddle steamer, a blockade runner, was wrecked on the coast of South Carolina off Battery Rutledge on the north side of Charleston Harbor. |
| Flavio Gioja | United Kingdom | The ship foundered "at the close of the year" with the loss of all hands. She was on a voyage from Quebec City, Province of Canada, British North America to the River Tyne. |
| Flora | Flag unknown | The barque was lost near Manasquan, New Jersey. |
| General Lee | United States | The 250-burden ton sternwheel paddle steamer sank in 10 feet (3.0 m) of water in the Savannah River below the Savannah City Works near Hammond, Georgia. |
| General McNeil | Flag unknown | The sternwheel paddle steamer struck a snag and sank in the Missouri River at Howards Bend near St. Louis, Missouri sometime during the 1860s. |
| Globe | United States | The 313-ton screw steamer burned on the Tittabawas River near Saginaw, Michigan. She was repaired and returned to service. |
| Goddess | Flag unknown | The vessel ran aground on the coast of California in San Francisco County. |
| Grampus | United States Army | The 221-ton sternwheel paddle steamer was stranded. |
| Gus Linn | United States | The 83-ton paddle steamer struck a snag and sank in the Missouri River off Thurston County, Nebraska Territory, in either Henry Bend or Upper Chatillion Bend, not far from Sioux City, Iowa. |
| CSS Josiah A. Bell | Confederate States Navy | American Civil War: The 412-ton sidewheel cottonclad gunboat was scuttled in Texas to prevent her capture by Union forces, possibly in Sabine Lake. |
| Joan Melchior Kemper | United Kingdom | The ship was wrecked on the coast of Japan. |
| Kiwi or Kinei | (United Kingdom of Great Britain and Ireland) New Zealand | The schooner sailed for Manukau Harbour from Hokitika in late 1865. She was never seen again. |
| Lancaster | United States | The sidewheel paddle steamer struck a snag and sank in the Missouri River at either Portland Bend or Smiths Island. |
| Lawrence | (United Kingdom of Great Britain and Ireland) New South Wales | The ship was wrecked on Flinders Island, Tasmania. She was on a voyage from Newcastle to Adelaide, South Australia. |
| Leviathan | United States | The 67-ton steamer was lost, probably on the Great Lakes. |
| Marens | Flag unknown | The brig sank in the James River in Virginia sometime during the American Civil War. |
| Maori Queen | (United Kingdom of Great Britain and Ireland) New Zealand | The wreck of a ship's longboat was discovered at Ruapuke Beach at the beginning of December. It was believed to be that of Maori Queen, a 15-ton schooner which had left Raglan for Onehunga some two months earlier. The ship was carrying at least a dozen passengers. |
| Oriona | Flag unknown | The brig was lost near Manasquan. |
| Orizaba | Confederate States of America | American Civil War: The sidewheel paddle steamer was lost during 1865. |
| Osiris | Confederate States of America | American Civil War: The 145- or 183-ton sidewheel paddle steamer, operated as a ferry by the Confederate Quartermaster Department on the coast of South Carolina between Charleston, Castle Pickney, and Sullivn's Island, was destroyed by a fire allegedly set by Union sympathizers sometime during the American Civil War (1861–1865). |
| Paraninihi or Pirinini | (United Kingdom of Great Britain and Ireland) New Zealand | The schooner sailed for Pātea from Wanganui in late 1865. She, and her crew of five, were never seen again. The schooner's longboat was washed ashore near the mouth of the Manawatu River in March 1866. |
| CSS Peedee No. 2 | Confederate States Navy | American Civil War: The steamer was destroyed on the Pee Dee River near Mars Bluff, South Carolina at the end of the American Civil War. |
| CSS Peedee No. 3 | Confederate States Navy | American Civil War: The torpedo boat was destroyed near Mars Bluff at the end of the American Civil War. |
| Pilot | (United Kingdom of Great Britain and Ireland) New Zealand | The 27-ton schooner was stranded and wrecked on the New Zealand South Island West Coast near Hokitika. |
| Race Horse | United States | The clipper vanished in early 1865. |
| Regent | United Kingdom | The barque foundered in the Atlantic Ocean after 20 September. Her 21 crew were rescued. She was on a voyage from the River Wear to Quebec City. |
| Rose B. Hamilton or (Rose B. Hambleton) | United States | American Civil War: While transporting part of the 3rd Michigan Cavalry Regiment (Union Army), the 175-ton sternwheel or 529-ton sidewheel paddle steamer struck a Confederate mine in the Lauren Gap Channel and sank in Mobile Bay, Alabama, either in April or on 12 May with the loss of either 13 killed, or 13 killed and wounded. |
| Seaboard | Confederate States of America | American Civil War: Sometime after her capture on 4 April by the tug USS Lilac (United States Navy), the sidewheel tug struck a snag in the James River at Drewry's Bluff, Virginia, and was run aground in a sinking condition. She was refloated by July. |
| Seaman's Bride | United States | The clipper was lost at Baker's Island. |
| Sir Henry Havelock | (United Kingdom of Great Britain and Ireland) New Zealand | The 17-ton cutter sailed for Invercargill from Hokitika in late 1865. She and her crew of three were never seen again. |
| Sir William Wallace | United Kingdom | The ship was wrecked in Chin Chew Bay. She was on a voyage from Chefoo to Amoy, China. |
| Stephen Decatur | United States | The 308-ton sidewheel paddle steamer sank in the Mississippi River at Devil's Island downstream of St. Louis, sometime between 1862 and 1865. She later was refloated. |
| Tempest | United States | The 364-ton sternwheel paddle steamer struck a snag and sank in the Missouri River at Upper Bonhomme Island, about 28 miles (45 km) above Yankton, Dakota Territory, ca. 1865. |
| William B. Romer | United States | The pilot schooner was wrecked on submerged rock – later named Romer Shoal – in New York Harbor sometime during the American Civil War. One pilot lost his life in the wreck. |
| Wythe | Flag unknown | The schooner sank in the James River in Virginia, Confederate States of America sometime during the American Civil War. |
| Unidentified possible floating battery | Confederate States of America | American Civil War: The vessel, possibly a floating battery, was still under construction at Edwards Ferry, North Carolina, when she was set afire and cast adrift on the Roanoke River in March or April and sank when she struck Confederate mines, possibly downstream of Jamestown, North Carolina. The gunboat USS Iosco (United States Navy) burned the portion of the vessel remaining above water on 10 April. |
