= Kauslers Island =

Island in Michigan

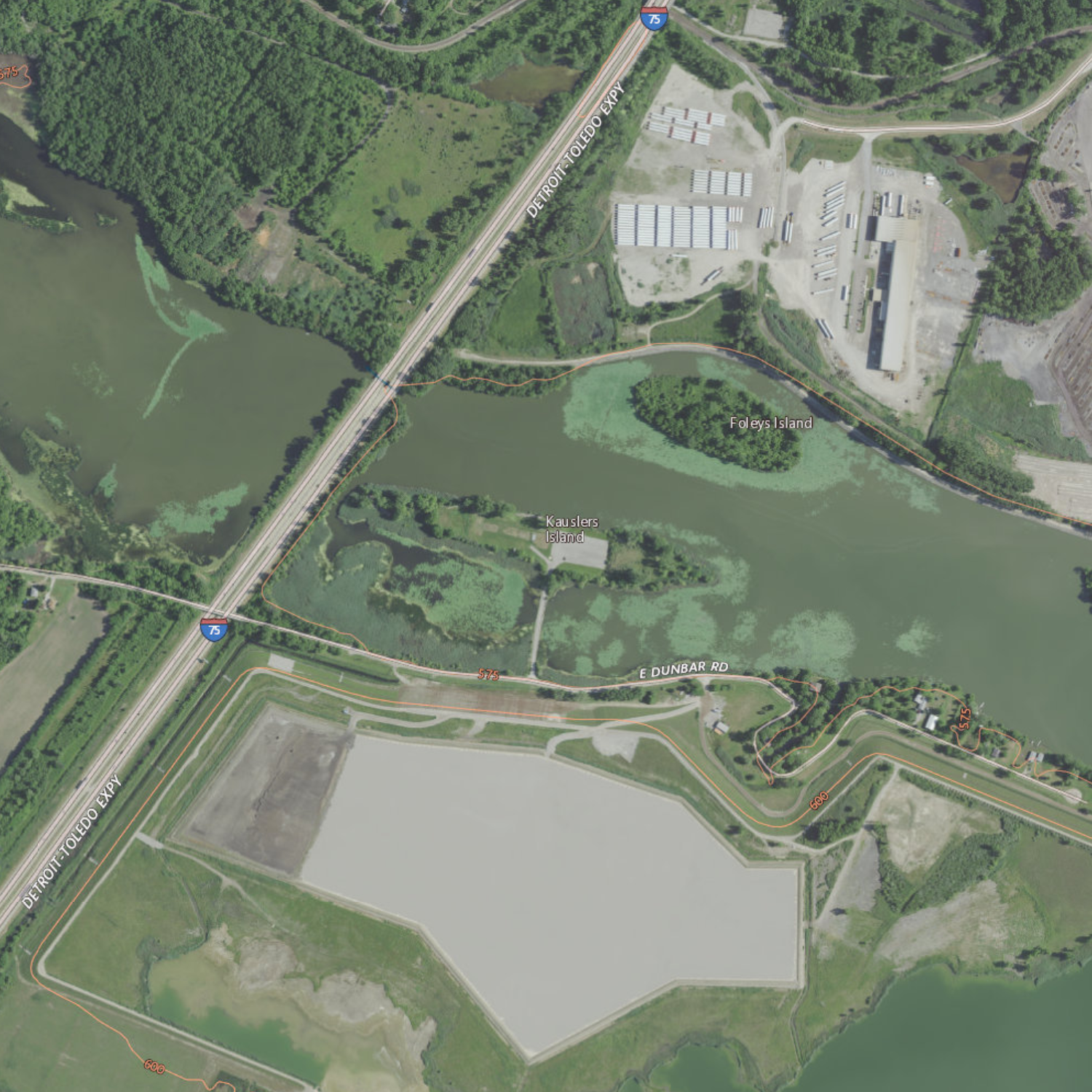
- USGS aerial imagery of Kauslers Island

- Location within Michigan Location within the United States

Geography
- Location: Southeast Michigan
- Coordinates: 41°53′28″N 83°22′35″W
- Adjacent to: Lake Erie
- Highest elevation: 581 ft (177.1 m)

Administration
- United States
- State: Michigan
- County: Monroe

Kauslers Island is an island in Plum Creek, near Lake Erie. It is in Monroe County, Michigan. Its coordinates are 41°53′28″N 83°22′35″W, and the United States Geological Survey gives its elevation as 581 ft (177 m).

== See also ==
- Foleys Island
- Smiths Island
