= Smiths Island =

Island in Michigan

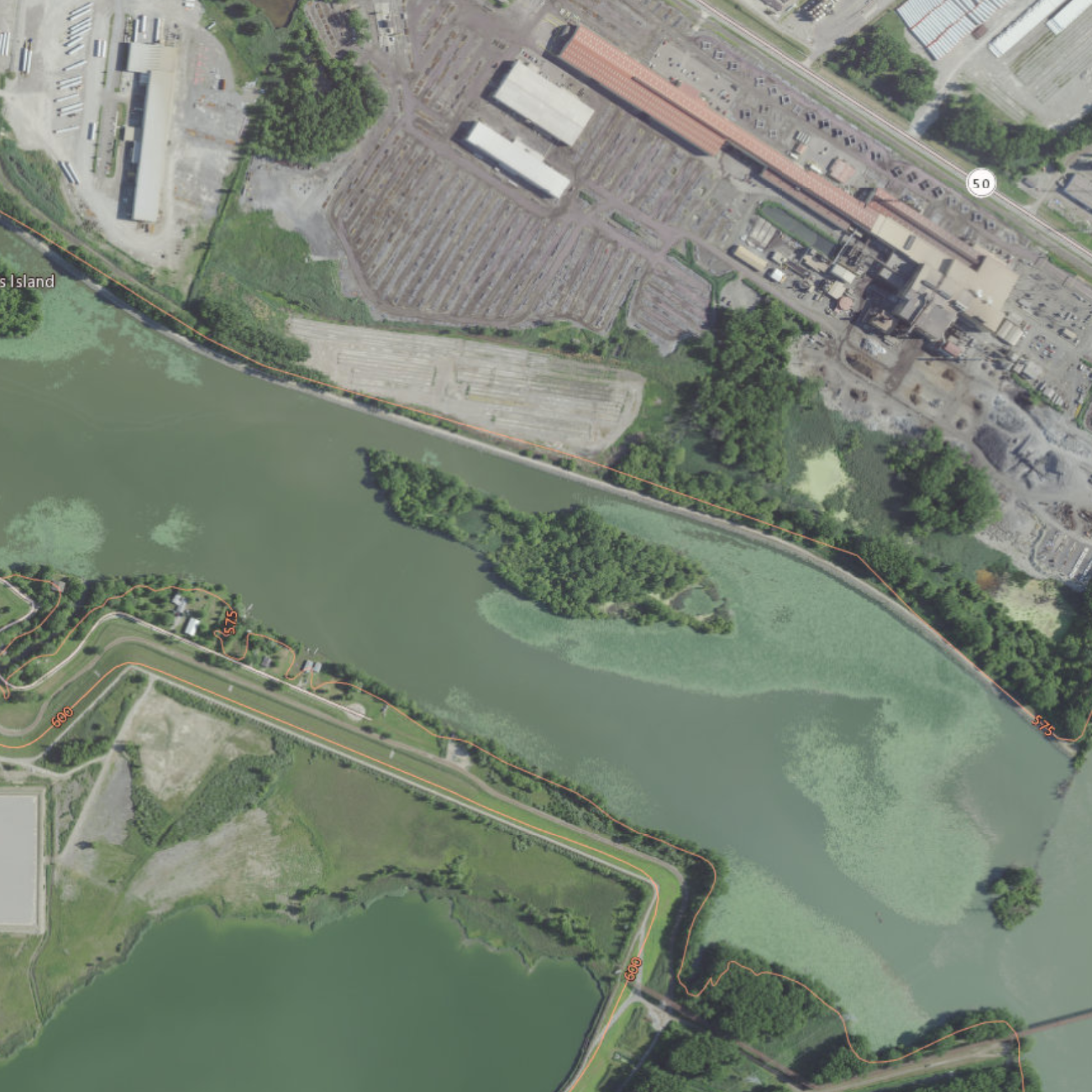
- USGS aerial imagery of Smiths Island

- Location within Michigan Location within the United States

Geography
- Location: Southeast Michigan
- Coordinates: 41°52′21″N 83°21′40″W
- Adjacent to: Lake Erie
- Highest elevation: 568 ft (173.1 m)

Administration
- United States
- State: Michigan
- County: Monroe

Smiths Island is an island in Plum Creek, next to Lake Erie. It is in Monroe County, in southeast Michigan. Its coordinates are 41°52′21″N 83°21′40″W, and the United States Geological Survey gives its elevation as 568 ft (173 m).

== See also ==
- Foleys Island
- Kauslers Island
