= USS Mist (1864) =

Gunboat of the United States Navy

History

United States
- Laid down: date unknown
- Launched: 1864
- Acquired: 23 December 1864
- Commissioned: 3 March 1865
- Decommissioned: August 1865
- Stricken: 1865 (est.)
- Fate: Sold, 17 August 1865

General characteristics
- Displacement: 232 tons
- Length: 157 ft 3 in (47.93 m)
- Beam: 30 ft 4 in (9.25 m)
- Draught: not known
- Propulsion: steam engine; stern wheel-propelled
- Speed: 5.5 knots
- Complement: not known
- Armament: two 20-pounder guns; four 24-pounder guns; one 12-pounder gun
- Armour: tinclad

The first USS Mist was a steamer purchased by the Union Navy during the American Civil War. She was planned by the Union Navy for use as a gunboat stationed off Confederate waterways to prevent their trading with foreign countries.

Mist, a stern wheel steamer built at Allegheny, Pennsylvania, in 1864, was purchased at Cincinnati, Ohio, 23 December 1864, and commissioned at Mound City, Illinois, 3 March 1865, Acting Master W. E. H. Fontress in command.

== Assigned to the Mississippi Squadron ==
Mist was converted into a gunboat during the first 4 months of 1865. The new tinclad was assigned to the 8th District, Mississippi Squadron and patrolled the river protecting steamers and river settlements from desperadoes.

== End-of-war decommissioning, sale, and subsequent civilian career ==
Mist was removed from naval duty 4 August; decommissioned at Mound City and was sold at public auction to C. C. Hutchinson 17 August 1865. Documented as a merchant ship, she served American commerce on the Mississippi River and its tributaries until 1874.
