= Millwall Iron Works =

Former industrial complex in London, England

Coordinates: 51°29′19.29″N 0°0′20.39″W

The Millwall Iron Works was a major 19th-century industrial and shipbuilding complex located in the Isle of Dogs, London, developing onwards from 1824. It was formed by consolidating a series of small shipbuilding companies to address the need to build increasingly larger and more complex ships. The holding company collapsed after the Panic of 1866 which greatly reduced shipbuilding in London. Although a series of smaller companies made a short recovery at the site, by the late 19th century the location was no longer viable. Most of its buildings, which were near the apex of the peninsula survived the Blitz and have since been made into a residential estate, Burrells Wharf.

== Background ==
By the early 18th century, the Land of Promise estate was in Marshwall (now Millwall) on the north side of the River Thames east of London, was owned by St Martin-in-the-Fields haberdasher Simon Lemon. Mastmaker Robert Todd then bought the estate, leaving it to his partner Thomas Todd and his wife's cousin Elizabeth, wife of mastmaker Charles Ferguson of Poplar. In 1824, industrialisation reached the area with the development of the chemical-processing works of the Imperial Gas Light & Coke Company.

== 1835–1846: Millwall Iron Works ==
In 1835 Scottish engineers William Fairbairn and David Napier bought the Land of Promise estate from Charles Augustus Ferguson, the start of making Millwall an important centre of iron shipbuilding.

In 1836, Fairbairn laid out an ironworks on a three-acre site to develop small ships, although his main works remained in Manchester. More than 100 ships, mostly under 2,000 tons, were built by Fairbairn at Millwall, including vessels for the Admiralty, the merchant marine of the Tsar of Russia and of the King of Denmark.

== 1848–1861: John Scott Russell ==
But the works were not a financial success, resulting in its sale in 1848 to John Scott Russell and partners. John Scott Russell built complete ships in the works, fully fitted out, which they then floated out on to the river as ready to go ships. One of their earliest commissions was the iron steamer Taman, completed in 1848 for the Imperial Russian government to operate from the Black Sea ports.

=== Great Eastern ===
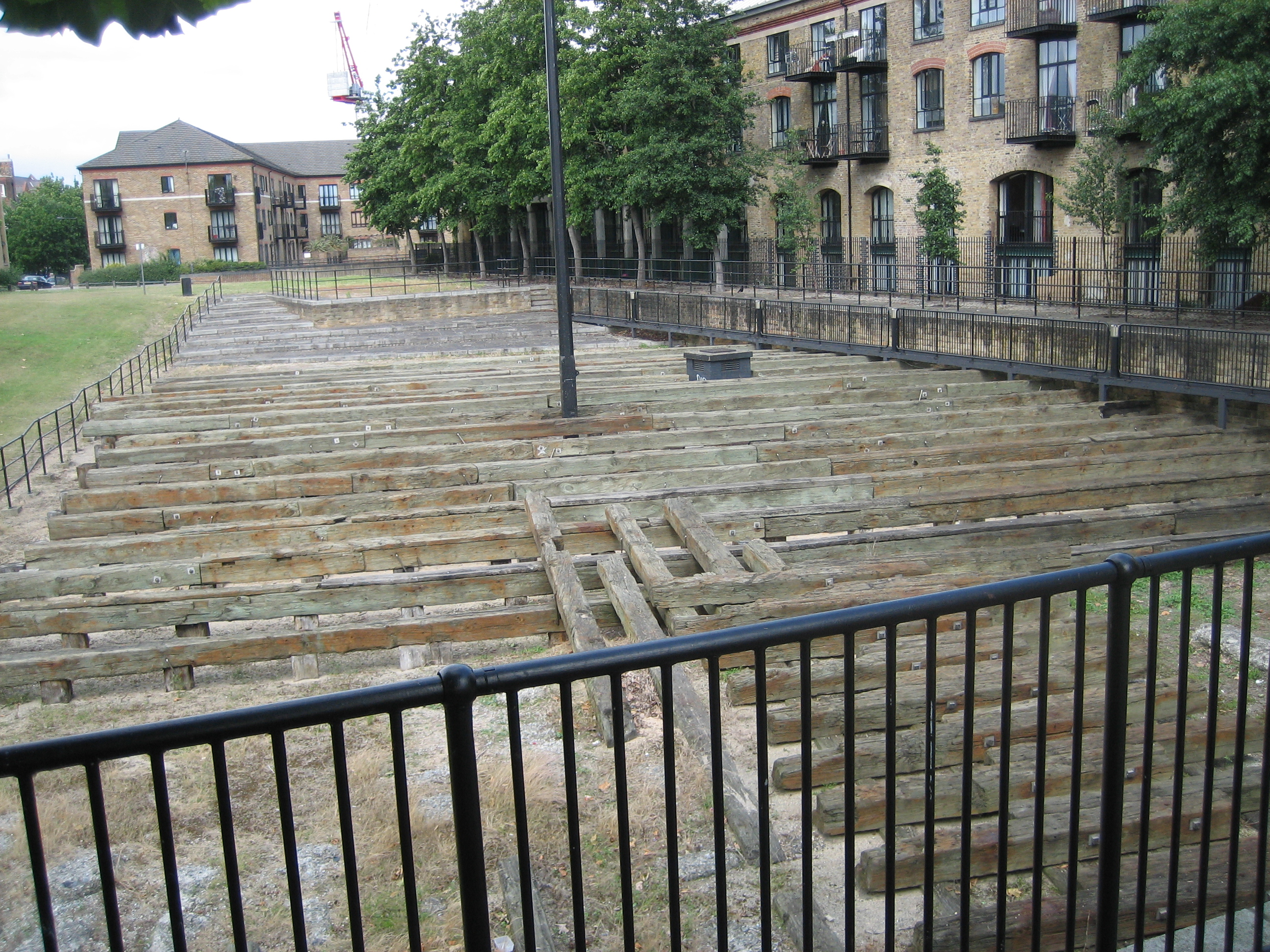
Some of the concrete and timber sub-structure of Great Eastern's launch ramp

On 31 January 1858, the largest ship of that time, the SS Great Eastern designed by Isambard Kingdom Brunel, was launched from 'Napier Yard' the shipyard leased by Messrs J. Scott Russell & Co. The 211 metre (692 ft) length was too wide for the river, and the ship had to be launched sideways. This increased the cost of the project, with cost over runs resulting in the bankruptcy of John Scott Russell.

Due to the technical difficulties of the launch, this was the last ship of such a size to be built on the Island, though other builders such as Yarrows and Samuda Brothers continued building warships on the island for another 50 years. A section of the concrete and timber sub-structure from the launch site, is preserved on site for public display at the modern Napier Avenue.

== 1861–1866: Millwall Iron Works, Ship Building & Graving Docks Company ==
Charles John Mare took over the iron works, and employed Welsh industrialist John Hughes, who became a director of the new successor company, the London Stock Exchange-listed Millwall Iron Works, Ship Building & Graving Docks Company Ltd.

The new company redeveloped the combined 27 acres (0.11 km^{2}) of works and shipyards, which had a river frontage of 1,900 feet (580 m). Famous for its iron cladding of the Royal Navy's ships under contract to the British Admiralty, at this point the Millwall Iron Works employed between 4,000 and 5,000 men. Conditions were good for an industrial complex of the time, with half-day Saturday working, a canteen, sports clubs and works band. Together with the Thames Ironworks and Shipbuilding Company, they were considered to be of greater national importance than the Royal Dockyards, with a production capacity for iron ships and armour greater than that of the whole of France.

== 1866: Millwall Iron Works ==
After the Panic of 1866, creating an international financial downturn that accompanied the failure of Overend, Gurney and Company in London, and the corso forzoso abandonment of the silver standard in Italy, the company failed. Various parts of the company were bought out of receivership, including the Millwall Iron Works now managed by John Hughes. The Mast House was taken over by N. J. & H. Fenner Oil & Lead Works.

== Today ==
By the early 20th century, iron making had ceased in Millwall, and the works continued as builder and repair of small ships, and steel fabrication unit, industrial storage sheds came to dominate the works. The site was converted to residential use as Burrells Wharf, with the last buildings added in the first decade after 2000.
