= HMS Thetis (1846) =

Frigate of the Royal Navy

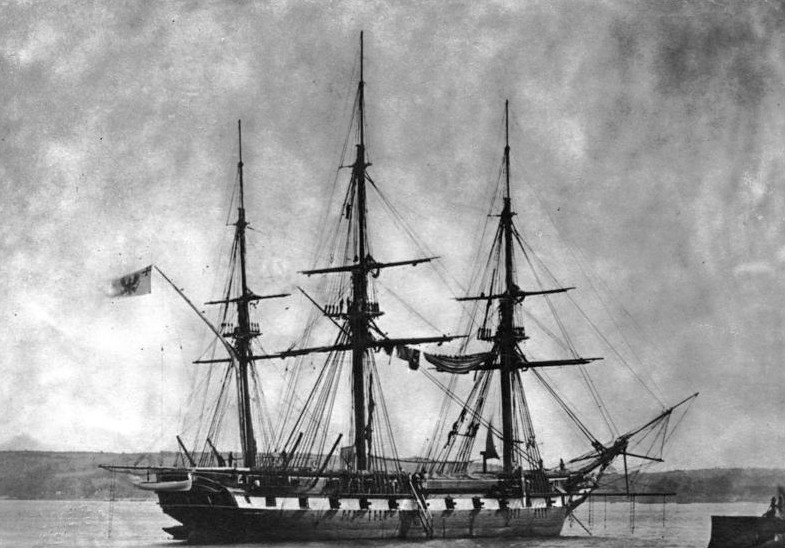
- SMS Thetis, the former HMS Thetis, circa 1867.

History

United Kingdom
- Name: HMS Thetis
- Namesake: Thetis
- Ordered: 23 April 1842 & 16 February 1843
- Builder: Devonport dockyard
- Laid down: 2 December 1844
- Launched: 21 August 1846
- Commissioned: 30 December 1846
- Fate: Transferred to the Prussian Navy on 12 January 1855

History

Prussia
- Name: SMS Thetis
- Acquired: 12 January 1855
- Decommissioned: 28 November 1871
- Stricken: 28 November 1871
- Fate: Broken up in 1894–95

General characteristics (as built)
- Class & type: 36-gun fifth-rate frigate
- Displacement: 1,894 long tons (1,924 t)
- Tons burthen: 1533 14/94 bm
- Length: 164 ft 7.25 in (50.2 m)
- Beam: 46 ft 8.75 in (14.2 m)
- Draught: 13 ft 10 in (4.2 m) (forward); 15 ft 5 in (4.7 m) (aft)
- Depth of hold: 13 ft 6.5 in (4.128 m)
- Sail plan: Ship rig
- Speed: 15 knots (28 km/h; 17 mph)
- Complement: 330
- Armament: Upper deck: 18 × 32-pounder (56 cwt) smoothbore guns (Note: "Cwt" is the abbreviation for hundredweight, 56 cwt referring to the weight of the gun.); 4 × 68-pounder (65 cwt) smoothbore guns; Quarterdeck: 10 × 32-pounder (25 cwt) smoothbore guns; Forecastle: 4 × 32-pounder (56 cwt) smoothbore guns

HMS Thetis was a 36-gun fifth-rate frigate of the Royal Navy. After nearly a decade of service with the British, she was transferred to Prussia in exchange for two steam gunboats. She served with the Prussian Navy, the North German Federal Navy and the Imperial German Navy as a training ship until being stricken in 1871. Thetis was subsequently converted into a coal hulk and broken up in 1894–95.

== Description ==
Thetis was a three-masted, ship-rigged frigate that had a sail area of 2,370 square metres (25,500 sq ft). Her maximum speed was 15 knots (28 km/h; 17 mph). The ship was considered to be a very good sea boat and very manoeuvrable, although she did suffer from severe pitching. Thetis had a crew of 330 officers and ratings in British service, but her crew numbered 35 officers and 345 enlisted men in Prussian service.

Measured at the gundeck, Thetis had a length of 164 feet 7.25 inches (50.2 m), a beam of 46 feet 8.75 inches (14.2 m) and a depth of hold of 13 ft 6.5 in (4.1 m). She was 1533 17/94 tons burthen in size and displaced 1,894 long tons (1,924 t). Forward, the ship had a draught of 13 ft 10 in (4.2 m) and 15 ft 5 in (4.7 m) aft.

In British service, Thetis was armed with eighteen 32-pounder (56 cwt) smoothbore and four 68-pounder (65 cwt) smoothbore shell guns on the upper deck. The ship was also fitted with ten 32-pounder guns on her quarterdeck and four more on her forecastle. All of these guns were of the lighter 25 cwt model. The Prussians rearmed her with thirty-eight Swedish 68-pounder guns, although two of these were later removed.

== Service history ==
Thetis was designed by Read, Chatfield and Creuze and she was the only ship of her class, which was approved on 16 March 1843. With the approval of the final order Thetis was laid down at Devonport Dockyard on 2 December 1844. She was launched on 21 August 1846 and duly commissioned for service on 30 December 1846, having cost £40,605, this rising to £51,926 to have her fitted for sea. In February 1847 she ran aground at Lisbon, Portugal, and was ordered to Plymouth, Devon for repairs. From 3 July 1850 to February 1854, her captain was Augustus Kuper. Kuper commissioned her at Plymouth. On 24 September 1850, Thetis ran aground at Redden Point, Devon. She was refloated and towed in to Plymouth Sound by HMS Confiance. Kuper subsequently sailed her to the south-east coast of America and then the Pacific. Kuper Island, one of the Gulf Islands in the Strait of Georgia, off the east coast of Vancouver Island, is named for him after he surveyed the area from 1851–53. A nearby island is named Thetis Island and several other localities on Vancouver Island are named after the ship, including Thetis Lake, Thetis Cove, Thetis Crescent and Thetis Lane.

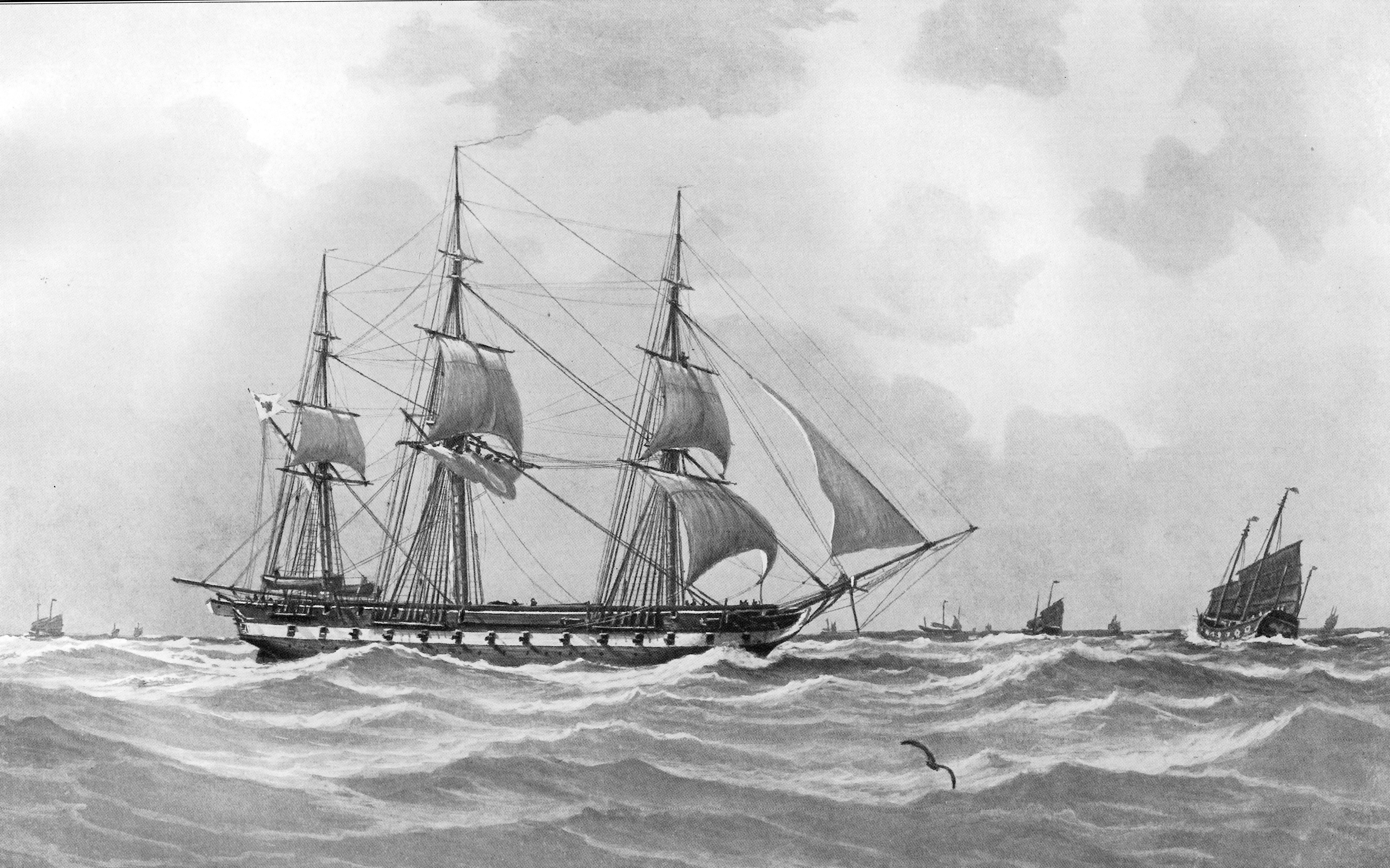
Preußische Fregatte SMS THETIS in ostasiatischen Gewässern um 1861. Gemälde von Lüder Arenhold 1905

After nine years of service she was disarmed and given to the Prussian Government in exchange for two steam gunboats on 12 January 1855. She was used by the Prussians as a training ship for cabin boys and naval cadets. By 1867, the ship was serving as an artillery training ship. Numbered among her cadets at this time was the future grand admiral Alfred von Tirpitz; also serving aboard her during this time were Lieutenant Commanders Eduard von Knorr and Max von der Goltz, both future admirals. After serving in the successive navies of the emerging German state, Thetis was stricken from the navy list on 28 November 1871. Her internal equipment was removed and she served as a coal hulk at Kiel, eventually being broken up there in 1894–95.
