= Lüder Arenhold =

German painter

Ferdinand Lüder Arenhold (May 7, 1854 – June 16, 1915) was a German marine painter who was best known for his reconstruction paintings and drawings of the Reichsflotte and the Preußische Marine.

== Life ==
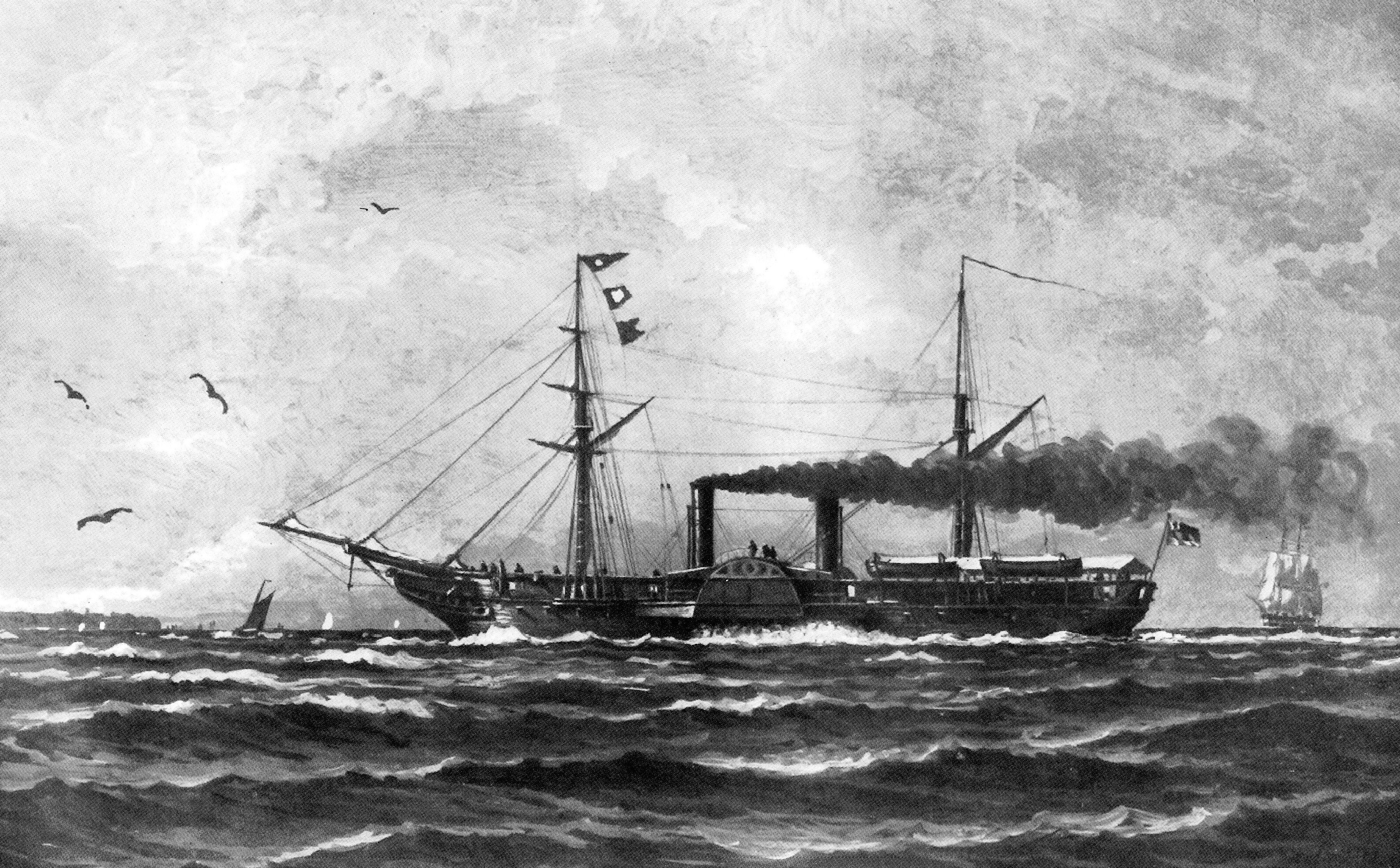
Radkorvette Grossherzog von Oldenburg der Reichsflotte um 1850

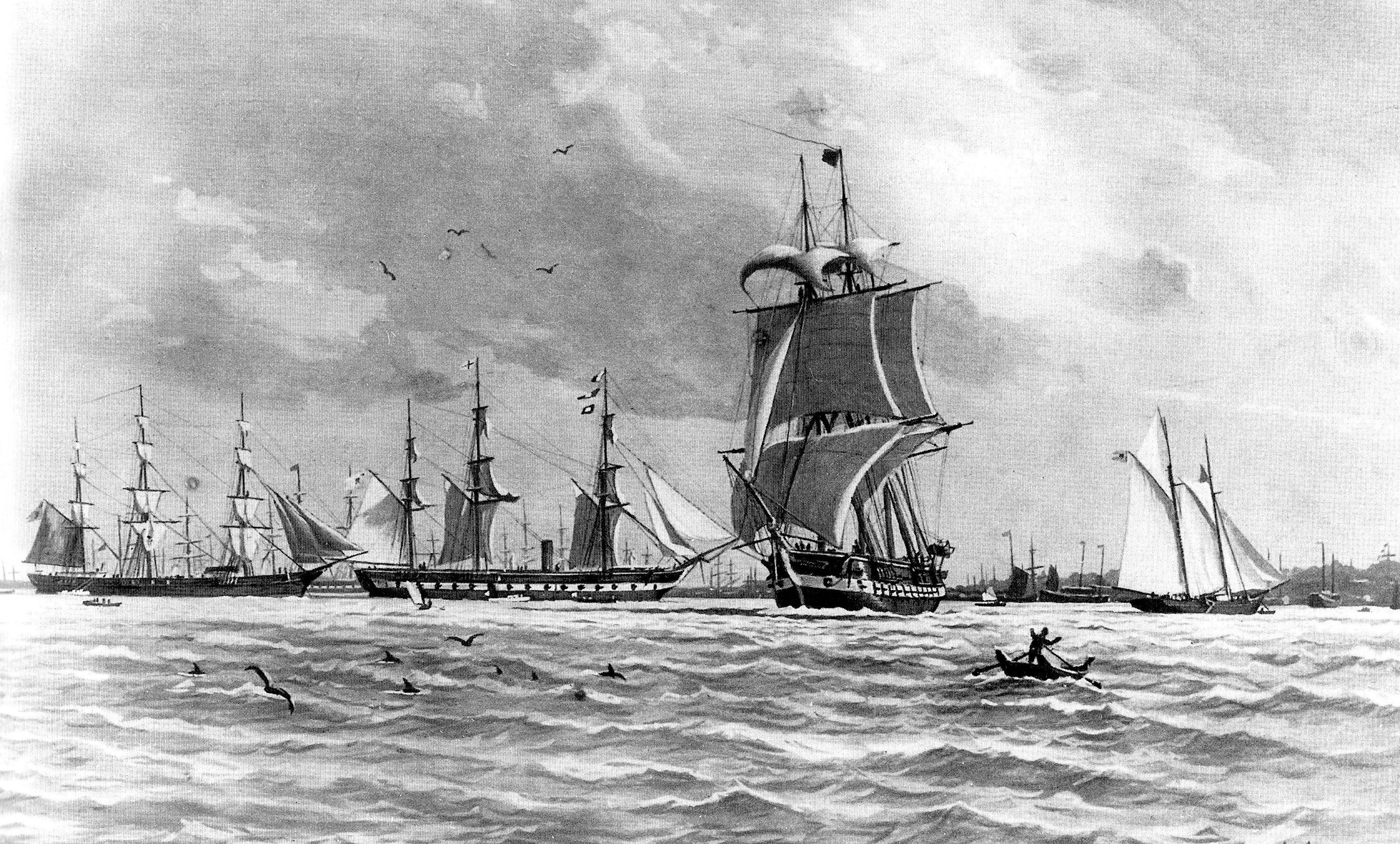
Das Ostasiatische Geschwader der Preußischen Kriegsmarine 1859 bis 1862 (1905)

Arenhold probably joined the Imperial German Navy at the beginning of the 1870s, and left in 1881 as a Kapitänleutnant of the Seewehr to work as a painter. In the naval service, he had visited South America and China. In Hamburg he took lessons from the painters Heinrich Leitner and Franz Johann Wilhelm Hünten, 1886/87 he was a master student of Hans Gude at the Prussian Academy of Arts in Berlin.

From 1887 on until his death, he lived in Kiel. Arenhold preferred oil painting; subjects were merely ships of the Imperial Navy and historical fleets. He attached great attention to details, especially in technical matters, but also did not neglect geographical details. He was particularly interested in the pre-history of the Imperial Navy, including the Reichsflotte. His representations are considered the first attempts to reconstruct the appearance of the units, of which often only rough representations existed.

Nothing is known about his privat life. He died at the age of 61 in Kiel.

== Publications ==
- Die historische Entwicklung der Schiffstypen, Kiel (Lipsius & Tischer) 1891.
- Erinnerungsblätter an die Königlich-preußische Marine 1848-1860, Berlin 1904. Reprint Berlin 1994. ISBN 3-930541-01-7
- Vor 50 Jahren – die deutsche Reichsflotte 1848-1852, Berlin 1906, Reprint Berlin 1995. ISBN 3-930541-07-6
