= Falke =

Falke is German for hawk. It may refer to:

== Aircraft ==
- Dornier Do H, a German monoplane fighter of the 1920s
- Focke-Wulf Fw 43, a light utility aircraft developed in 1932
- Focke-Wulf Fw 187, a German 1930s twin-engine fighter
- Scheibe Falke, a motor glider
- Slingsby Falke, a motor glider
- Sokopf Falke, an Austrian paramotor design

== Ships ==
- SMS Falke, three ships of the Imperial German Navy and Austro-Hungarian Navy
- German trawler V 104 Falke, a German cargo ship converted into an auxiliary warship in World War II

== People ==
- Gustav Falke (1853–1916), German writer
- Johannes Falke (1823–1876), German historian
- Falké Bacharou, Nigerian politician

== Other uses ==
- T4 model of the G7e torpedo, a German U-boat torpedo of World War II
- Falke (spacecraft), a German program to fly a subscale model of the Space Shuttle orbiter

== See also ==
- Falkes de Breauté (died 1226), Anglo-Norman soldier and High Sheriff
- Falke, Falcken, Falken, Falkenreck, an Ancient Noble German family
- Falk (name)
- Phalke (surname)
