= Bruno Kreisky Prize for Services to Human Rights =

Human rights prize

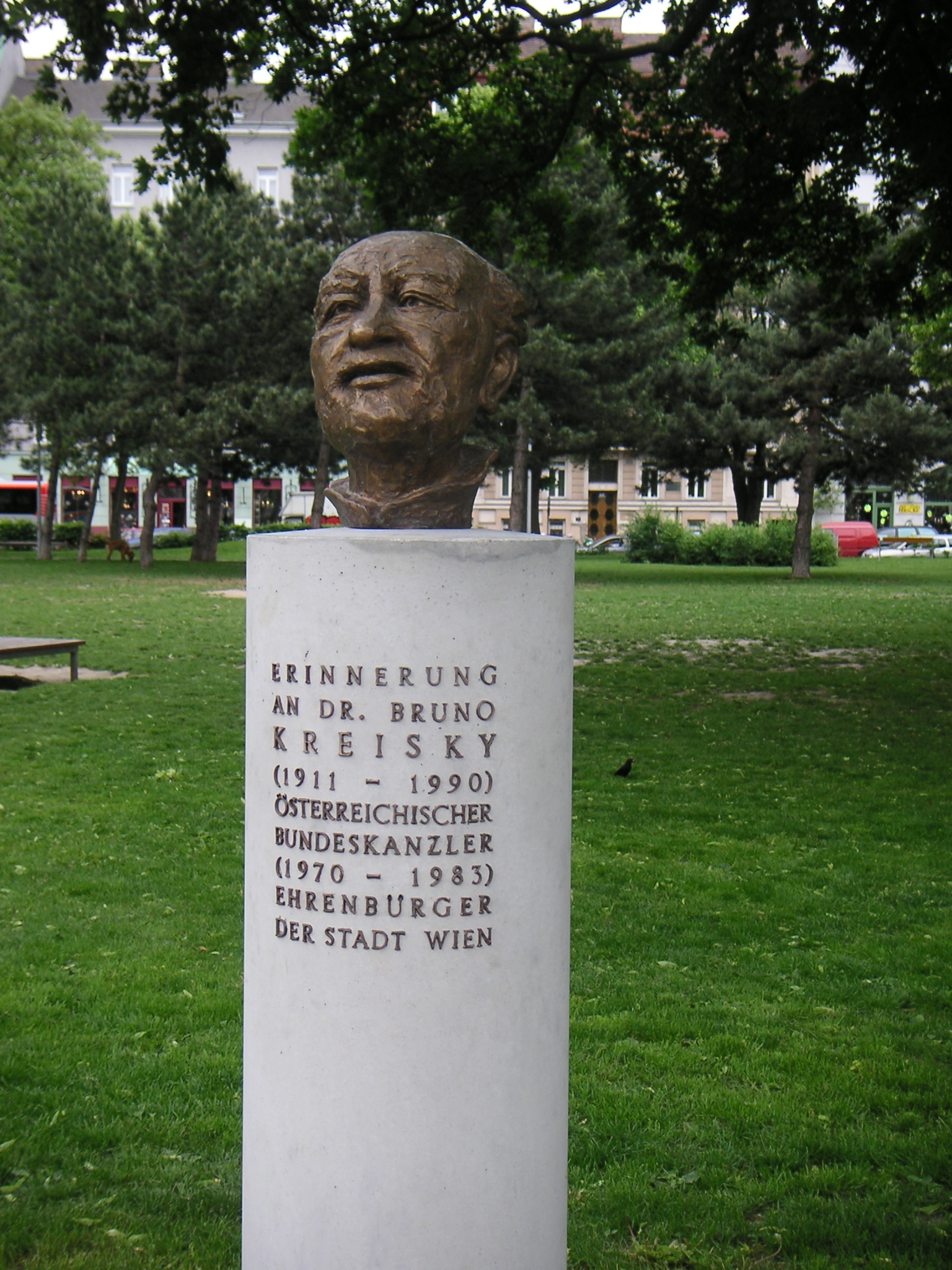
Bust of Bruno Kreisky

The Bruno Kreisky Prize for Human Rights is a biennial award created in October 1976 on the occasion of the 65th birthday of Bruno Kreisky. The laureates are rewarded for their achievements in the field of human rights. The prize was divided in 1993 into a human rights prize (between 7000 and 30,000 Euros) and a prize in recognition of merit. The Bruno Kreisky Foundation for Human Rights has awarded in 14 conferments more than 130 individuals, institutions and human rights projects for outstanding services to the development and protection of international human rights and extraordinary achievements in the area of humanitarian aid. The prize winners are chosen both by the board of trustees of the Bruno Kreisky Foundation and by an international jury.

== Laureates ==
=== 1979 ===
- Cardinal Raúl Silva Henríquez, Chile
- Arie Lova Eliav, Israel
- Issam Sartawi, Palestine
- Archbishop Miguel Obando y Bravo, Nicaragua
- Hildegard Goss-Mayr and Jean Goss, Austria/France
- Christiaan Frederick Beyers Naudé, South Africa
- Amnesty International Group II, Austria
- Amnesty International, Austrian Section
- Committee for Human Rights, International Trade Union, Austria

=== 1981 ===
- Simha Flapan, Israel
- Raymonda Tawil, Israel
- Nelson Mandela, South Africa
- Rosa Jochmann, Austria
- Domitila Chúngara, Bolivia
- Enrique Álvarez Córdova, El Salvador
- Kim Chi-ha, South Korea
- Kim Dae Jung, South Korea
- Histadrut, Israel
- Fondation pour une entraide intellectuelle européenne, France
- Orlando Fals Borda, Columbia
- Felix Ermacora, Austria

=== 1984 ===
- The Austrian Aid Committee for Nicaragua, Austria
- The Austrian Volkshilfe, Austria
- The Austrian League for Human Rights, Austria
- Union of Concerned Scientists
- The Society of Friends of Tel Aviv University, Austria
- Vicaría de la Solidaridad, Chile
- Oswald Amstler, Austria
- Archbishop Raymond G. Hunthausen, USA
- Muzaffer Saraç, Turkey
- Shulamit Aloni, Israel
- Luiz Inácio Lula da Silva, Brazil
- Father Leopold Ungar, Austria
- Yolanda Urízar Martínez de Aguilar, Guatemala
- Marianella García Villas, El Salvador

=== 1986 ===
- The Bruno Kreisky Archives Foundation, Austria
- The Vienna Institute for Development and Cooperation, Austria
- Herbert Amry, Austria
- The Austrian Institute for Peace Research and Education, Austria
- The Committee of Mothers of Political Prisoners, the Disappeared and Murdered in El Salvador, El Salvador
- The Guatemalan Human Rights Commission, Guatemala
- The Austrian Board for Refudee Aid, Austria
- International Historians of the Labour Movement, ITH
- Jewish-Arab House in Beth Berl, Israel
- Erich Weisbier, Austria

=== 1988 ===
- Frei Betto, Brazil
- Benazir Bhutto, Pakistan
- Latif Dori, Israel
- Anton Lubowski, Namibia
- Sergio Ramírez Mercado, Nicaragua
- Claudia Vilanek, Austria
- Bishop Leonidas Eduardo Proaño Villalba, Ecuador
- The Society of Friends of the Chaim Sheba Medical Center Tel Hashomer, Austria
- The Society for Austrian-Arab Relations, Austria
- Greenpeace, Austria
- The Guatemalan Human Rights Organisation GAM, Guatemala
- International Helsinki Federation, Austria
- The Korean Catholic Justice and Peace Committee, Netherlands
- Neve Shalom/Wahat al-Salam, Israel
- Catholic Social Academy of Austria, Austria
- The Committee for Social and Medical Aid for Palestinians, Austria
- Unidad Nacional de Trabajadores Salvadoreños, El Salvador
- The Association for the History of the Labour Movement, Austria

=== 1991 ===
- Bärbel Bohley, Germany
- Congress of South African Trade Unions, South Africa
- Yael Dayan, Israel
- Faisal Husseini, Palestine
- International Center for Peace in the Middle East, Israel/Palestine
- İnsan Hakları Derneği, Turkey
- Horst Kleinschmidt, South Africa/Great Britain
- Committee Cap Anamur, Germany
- Felicia Langer, Israel
- Paulinho Paiakan, Brazil
- Standing Committee for National Dialogue, El Salvador
- Poznán Human Rights Center, Poland
- Jalal Talabani, Syria/Iraq
- Alfredo Vázquez Carrizosa, Colombia
- Anti-Apartheid Movement, Austria
- CARE, Austria
- Social Services at Schwechat Airport, Austria
- Liesl Frankl, Austria
- Association of Women's solidarity, Austria
- Society for the Endangered Peoples, Austria
- Bishop Erwin Kräutler, Brazil
- The Austrian Red Cross, Austria
- Science shop at the University of Linz, Austria
- Aid Committee for Refugees in Austria, Austria

=== 1993 ===
- Abe J. Nathan, Israel
- The indigenous people of the Canela, Brazil
- Gani Fawehinmi, Nigeria
- Nicolae Gheorghe, Romania
- Christine Hubka and Gertrud Hennefeld, Austria
- Father Georg Sporschill, SJ, Romania
- Kemal Kurspahić and Zlatko Dizdarević, Bosnia-Herzegovina
- Tanja Petovar, Yugoslavia
- Memorial, Russia
- Rudolf Pichlmayr, Germany
- Martha Kyrle, Austria
- SOS Mitmensch, Austria
- Croatian-Muslim-Serbian-Dialogue, Austria

=== 1995 ===
- Sumaya Farhat Naser, Palestine
- Sergej Adamowitsch Kowaljow, Russia
- Ken Saro-Wiwa, Nigeria
- Leyla Zana, Turkey
- Committee for the Defense of Human Rights in Iran, Austria
- World University Service, Graz, Austria
- Ludwig Boltzmann Institut für Menschenrechte, Austria
- Flüchtlingshilfe Poysdorf (Maria Loley), Austria
- The homeless shelter "Die Gruft" Austria
- Father August Janisch Austria

=== 1997 ===
- Abbas Amir-Entezam, Iran
- Emily Lau, Hong Kong
- Uri Avnery, Israel
- Ivan Zvonimir Čičak, Croatia
- Otto Tausig, Austria
- Willi Resetarits, Austria
- Austrian Network Against Poverty, Austria

=== 2000 ===
- Radhika Coomaraswamy, Sri Lanka, UN-Special Ambassador for the matters related to violence against women
- The Belgrade Center for Human Rights, Yugoslavia
- Austrian NGO-project "An anti-discrimination law for Austria"
- Karlheinz Böhm, Austria/Ethiopia

=== 2002 ===
- Cardinal Franz König, Austria, the former archbishop of Vienna for his dedication to tolerance and dialogue
- Ute Bock, Austria, for her commitment to helping refugees
- Amira Hass, Israel/Palestine, for her outstanding and independent work in journalism;
- Palestinian Centre for Human Rights from Gaza/Palestine, for its dedication to protecting human rights in the occupied Palestinian territories.

=== 2005 ===
- Nadja Lorenz and Georg Bürstmayr, Austria for the advocacy of the asylum seekers' and migrants' rights in Austria
- Andrej Sannikov from Belarus for his work within the Charter 97, a citizens' action group and human rights organisation from Minsk.

=== 2007 ===
- Gao Zhisheng, China
- Manfred Nowak, Austria
- ZARA Austria (see German Wikipedia article)
- Kofi Annan, United Nations
- Jovan Mirilo, Serbia

=== 2011 ===
- ASPIS, Austria
- ESRA, Austria
- Hemayat, Austria
- Daniel Barenboim, Israel/ Palestine, For his commitment to reconciliation in the Middle East conflict
- West-Eastern Divan Orchestra

=== 2013 ===
- Bogaletch Gebre, Ethiopia
- Mazen Darwish, Syria
- Cecily Corti, Austria

=== 2015 ===
- Vian Dakhil, Iraq
- Marijana Grandits, Austria
- Nachbarinnen in Wien, Austria

=== 2017 ===
- Aslı Erdoğan, Turkey
- Wolfgang Kaleck, Germany
- Queer Base, Austria
- Haus Liebhartstal UMF, Austria

=== 2019 ===
- Amal Fathy, Egypt
- Know Your Rights, Austria
- Michael Landau, Austria
- Shalom Alaikum – Jewish Aid for Refugees, Austria

=== 2022 ===
- Al-Haq, Palestine
- Asylum Coordination Austria, Austria
- Martin Hochegger, Austria/Tanzania
- Maria Kalesnikava, Belarus
