= Falk (name) =

Origin
- Origin: Old Norse, Middle High German
- Meaning: falcon
- Region of origin: Northern Europe

Other names
- Variant forms: Falck, Falke, Falco, Valke, Valcke, Faulk

Falk is a given name and surname cognate with the word falcon.

== Surname ==
- Adalbert Falk (1827–1900), Prussian politician
- Adam Falk (born 1965), physicist
- Alexander A. Falk (1900–1975), American politician from New York
- Armin Falk (born 1968), German economist
- Bayla Falk, Talmudist
- Bernard Falk (1943–1990), UK television reporter
- Bibb Falk (1899–1989), American baseball player and coach
- Christine Falk (born 1966), German immunologist
- David Falk (born 1950), American sports agent
- Elin Falk (1872-1942), Swedish gymnastics director and educator
- Gathie Falk (1928–2025), Canadian painter and sculptor
- Gertrude Falk (1925–2008), American physiologist
- Greger Falk (1910–1990), Swedish Air Force major general
- Hayyim Samuel Jacob Falk (1708–1782), better known as Baal Shem of London, British rabbi
- Henri Falk (1881–1937), French writer
- Isidore Sydney Falk (1899–1984), American public health expert
- Jacob Joshua Falk (Jacob Joshua ben Tzebi Hirsch Falk; 1680–1756), Talmudist and author of Pene Yehoshua
- James Falk (born 1954), American inventor
- Jim Falk (born 1946), physicist and academic researcher
- Johan Peter Falk (sometimes spelled Falck; 1733–1774), Swedish botanist
- Johannes Daniel Falk (1768–1826), German writer
- Joshua Falk (Joshua ben Alexander ha-Kohen Falk; 1555–1614), author of commentaries on the Arba'ah Turim and Shulkhan Arukh
- Louis Falk (1935–2025), American Anglican bishop
- Luke Falk (born 1994), American football player
- Marjeta "Neca" Falk (born 1950), Slovenian and Yugoslav singer, actress and artist
- Miksa Falk (1828–1908), Hungarian journalist
- Naomi Falk, American writer and publisher
- Nelson H. Falk (1874–1924), American politician
- Norbert Falk (1872–1932), Austrian journalist and writer
- Paul Falk (figure skater) (1921–2017), German figure skater
- Pesach Eliyahu Falk (1944–2020), British rabbi
- Peter Falk (1927–2011), American actor
- Rasmus Falk, (born 1992), Danish footballer
- Richard A. Falk, (born 1930), Jewish-American legal scholar
- Robert Falk, (1886–1958), Jewish Russian painter
- Robert A. Falk (1926-2014), American farmer and politician
- Roland Falk, (1915–1985), British test pilot
- Rossella Falk, (1926–2013), Italian actress
- Robert Conrad, (1934–2020), American actor, born Conrad Robert Falk
- Ted Falk, Canadian politician

== Given name ==
- Falk Hentschel (born 1982), German actor
- Falk Balzer (born 1973), German hurdler
- Falk Boden (born 1960), German cyclist
- Falk Cohn (1833–1901), German rabbi
- Falk Huste (born 1971), German boxer
- Falk Struckmann (born 1958), German opera singer
- Falk Maria Schlegel (Christian Jost; born 1975), German keyboardist

== See also ==
- Falck (disambiguation)
