= Ny Kongensgade 9 =

Building in Copenhagen, Denmark

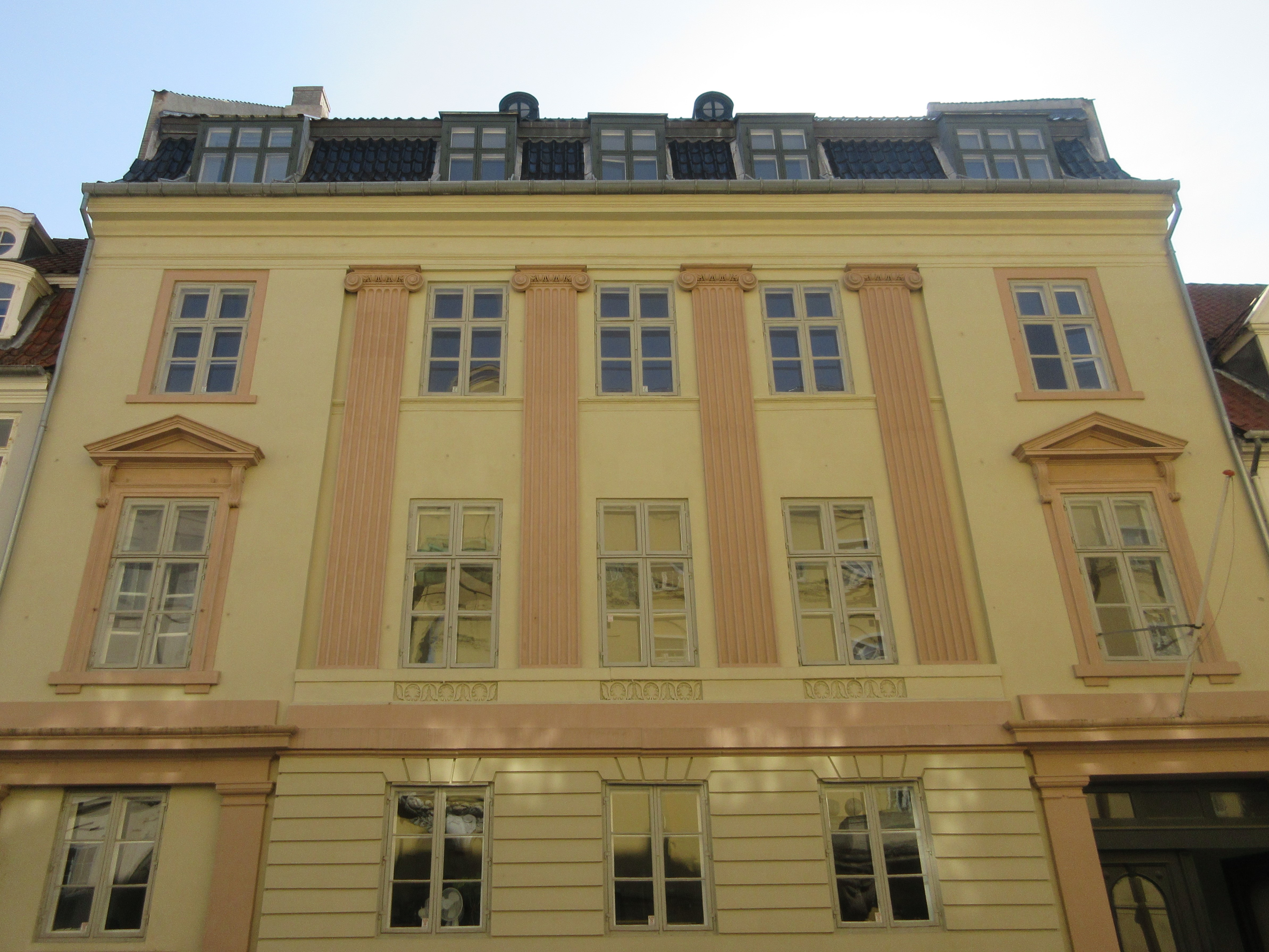
- Interactive map of the Ny Kongensgade 9 area

General information
- Location: Copenhagen, Denmark
- Coordinates: 55°40′25.46″N 12°34′35.72″E
- Completed: 1804

Ny Kongensgade 9 is a Neoclassical property located in the small Frederiksholm Neighborhood of central Copenhagen, Denmark. It consists of a three-storey building with mansard roof from 1804 towards the street, a six-bay side wing along the eastern margin of a courtyard and an older two-storey building at its rear. The building from 1804 with its six-bay side wing, was listed in the Danish registry of protected buildings and places in 1904. The low building in the courtyard is not listed.

== History ==
=== 18th century ===
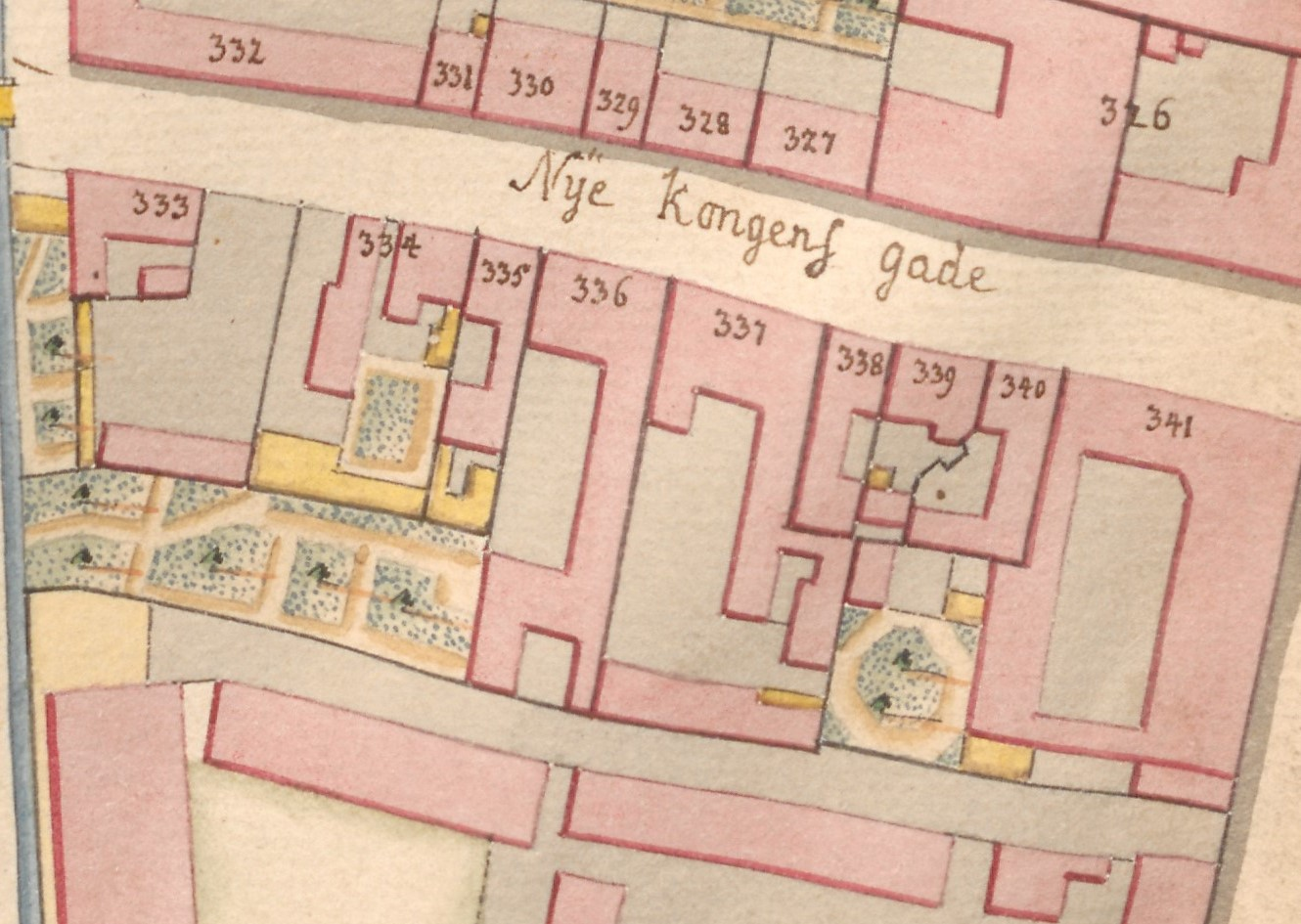
No. 337 seen on a detail from Christian Gedde's map of Copenhagen's West Quarter, 1757.

The property was listed in Copenhagen's first cadastre of 1689 as No. 293 in Western Quarter. It was owned by a blacksmith named Svendsen, employed at the Arsenal. The property was listed in the new cadastre of 1756 as No. 337. It was owned by stone mason Jacot Bortling at that time.

=== 19th century ===
The present building on the site was constructed in 1804 for Christian Nicolai Lautrup (1764–1817). He worked as a senior clerk for Den Almindelige Enkekasse. His property was listed in the new cadastre of 1806 as No. 232. His son by the same name was later director of Den Almindelige Enkekasse. Another son, Jørgen Hjort Lautrup, would become Bishop of Lolland-Falster.

Notable 19th century residents include the politician Frederik Moltke (1811–1813 and again 1825–1830), actor and stage director Frederik Schwarz (1822), engineer Ludwig A. Colding (mid-1840s), politician Iver Johan Unsgaard (1857–1858), politician Ludvig Nicolaus von Scheele (first floor, ?–1874), art historian Julius Lange (mid-1870s), painter Carl Bloch (first floor, 1879–1881) and painter and illustrator Lorenz Frølich (1899 – c. 1904).

=== Skibsted family ===
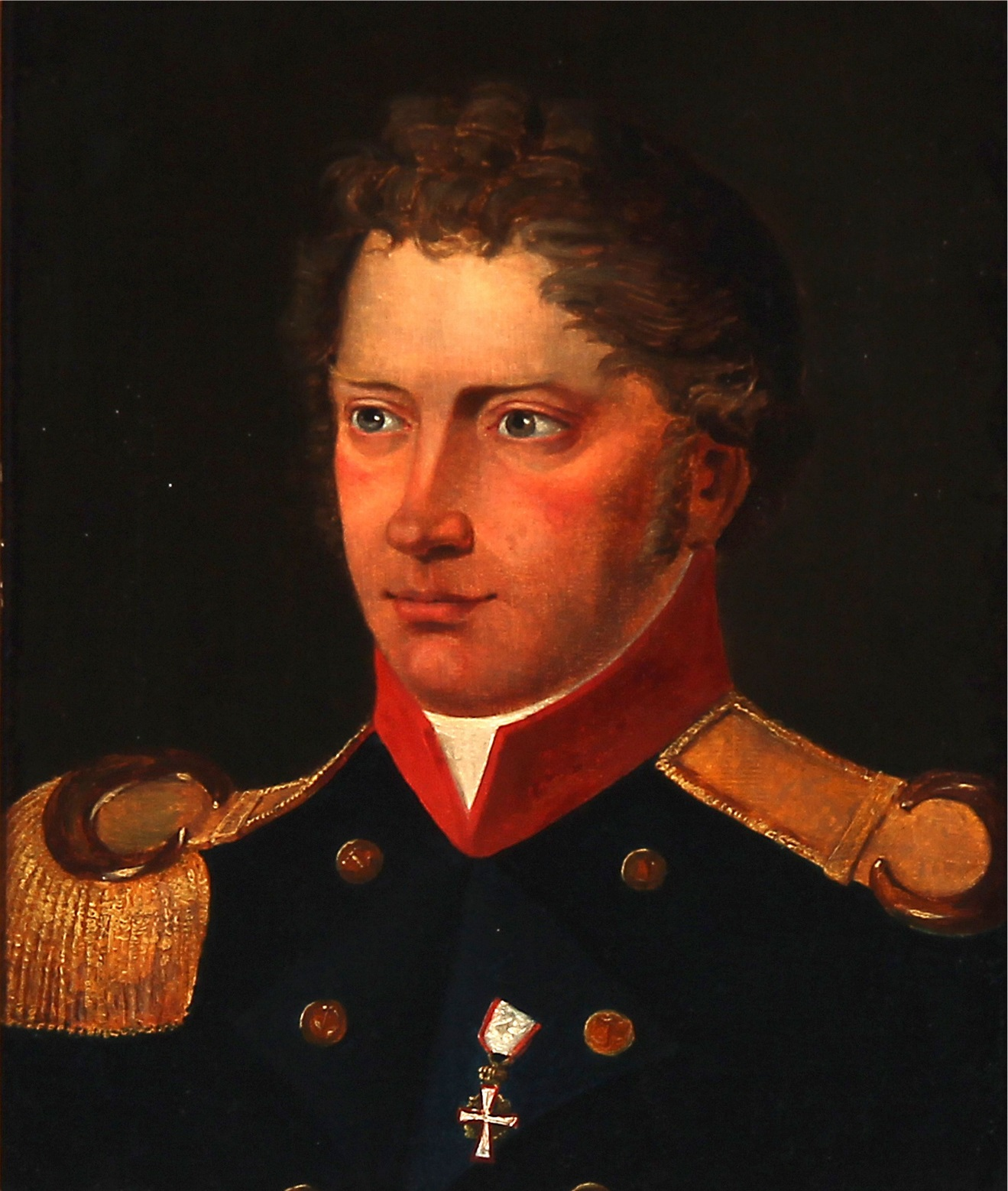
Peter Nicolay Skibsted

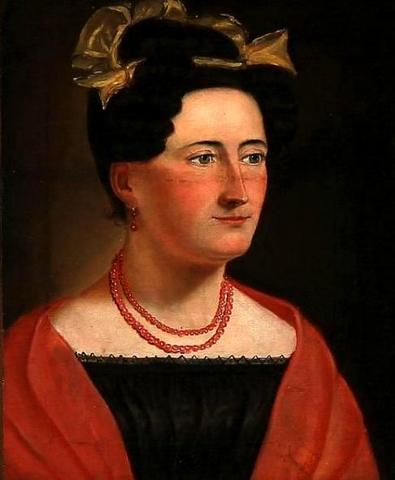
Ellen Sophia Cathrina Skibsted, née von Bergen

Ellen Sophie Skibsted (née von Bergen), widow of the naval officer Peter Nicolai Skibste, resided in the ground-floor apartment at the 1840 census. Sje lived there with her nine children (aged nine to 25), her parents Georg Vilhelm von Bergen and Louise von Bergen (née Grüner), one male servant, one maid and the lodger Villiam Christian Smith (senior clerk in Justitsraad Weidemann's office).

=== 1880 census ===
The property was home to 61 residents at the 1880 census. Thorvald Mathias Wienberg, an architect, resided on the ground floor with his wife Charlotte?? Elisabeth Wienberg (née Rothe), two maids and the jurist Lars Christian Brun. Carl Bloch resided on the first floor with his wife Alma Bloch født Trepka, their six children (aged one to ten), four maids and the lodger Anders Fonnesbeck. Ulrik Anton de Fine Skibsted (1846-1931), a first lieutenant in the Royal Danish Navy, resided on the second floor with his wife Carla Hedevig Skibsted Berling (née Mæller, 1852-1932), their three children (aged two to five), two maids, a male servant, a coachman and the lodger Chr. Frederik Zeuthen Schulin (jurist) and Christian Olavius Zeuthen (landscape painter). Kirstine Marie Flugel, a housekeeper, resided on the third floor (garret) with the pianist Henrich Kaas. Claus Sørensen, a grocer (høker), resided in the basement with his wife Cathrine Sørensen født Nielsen, their two children (aged one and four) and one maid. Christen Rasmussen, a concierge, resided in the basement with his wife Johanne Vilhelmine Rasmussen (née Petersen) and their two daughters (aged one and five). Jens Madsen Borch, a smith, resided on the ground floor of the rear wing with his wife Anna Lovise Katarina Borch (née Schrøder), their 16-year-old son and one lodger. Henrik Wilhelm Remwaldt, a master bookbinder, resided on the first floor of the rear wing with his wife Johanne Susanne Remwaldt and their five children (aged 10 to 20). Adam Ludvig Terkelsen, a saddler, resided on the first floor of the rear wing with his wife Martha Lovise Terkelsen (née Mortensen), their two children (aged two and four) and his brother Ludvig Mortensen. Jørgen Rasmussen, bank courier, resided in the garret of the rear wing with his wife Pauline Marie Rasmussen fød Lange with his one-year-old daughter and the seamstress Thora Cealie Rasmussen.

=== 20th century ===
Sophus Falck was a resident in the building from 1910 and opened the first Falck station in a building in the courtyard (No. 9C). The company had until then been based at No. 15 in the same street. Falck left the premises just five years later when the transition from horse-drawn vehicles to automobiles made the location impractical. The building in the courtyard was then left empty for a while. It was taken over in 1941 by the Danish chapter of the Templars of Honor and Temperance. They occupied the building until 2015.

== Architecture ==
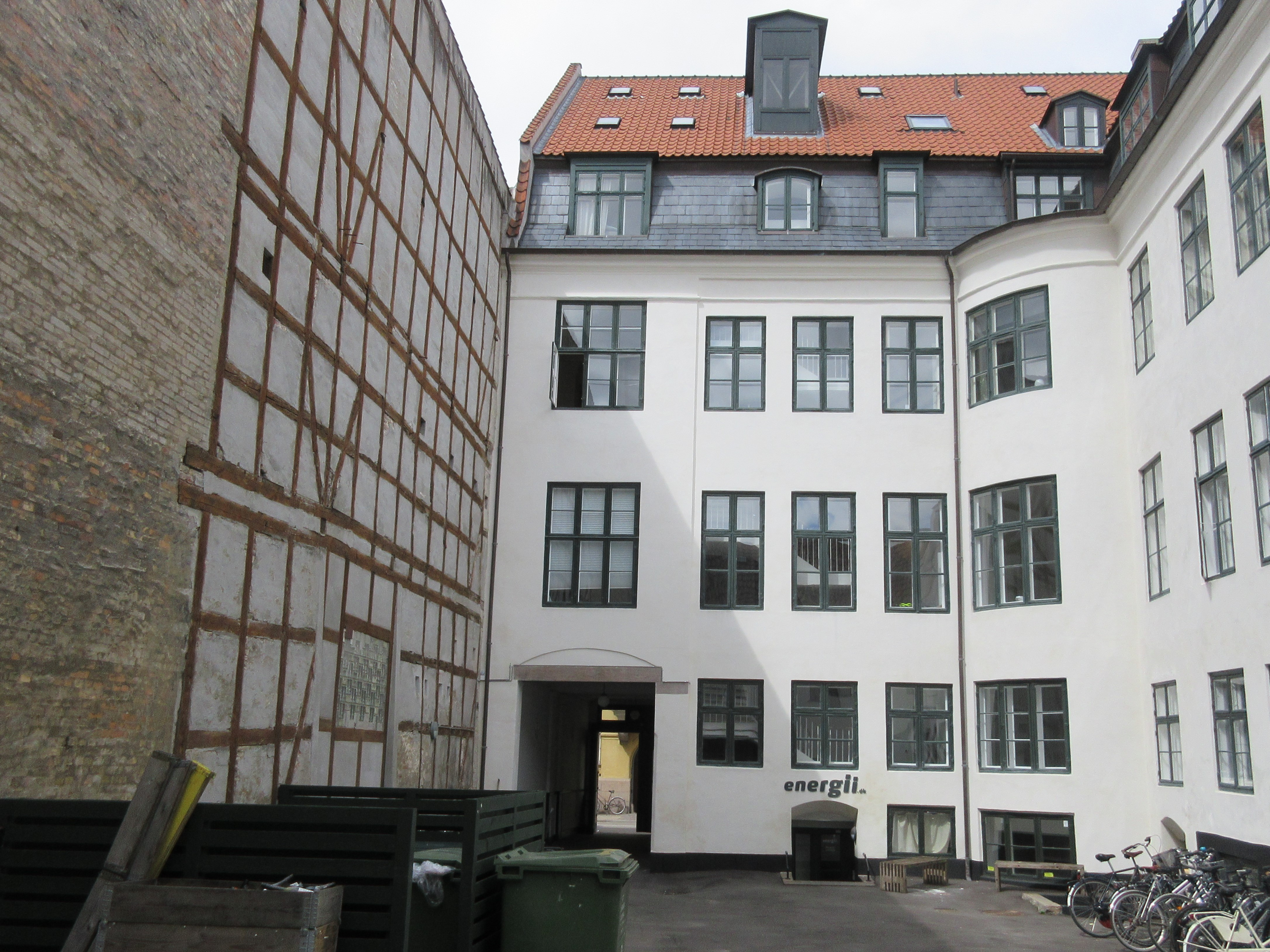
The rear side of the building towards the street

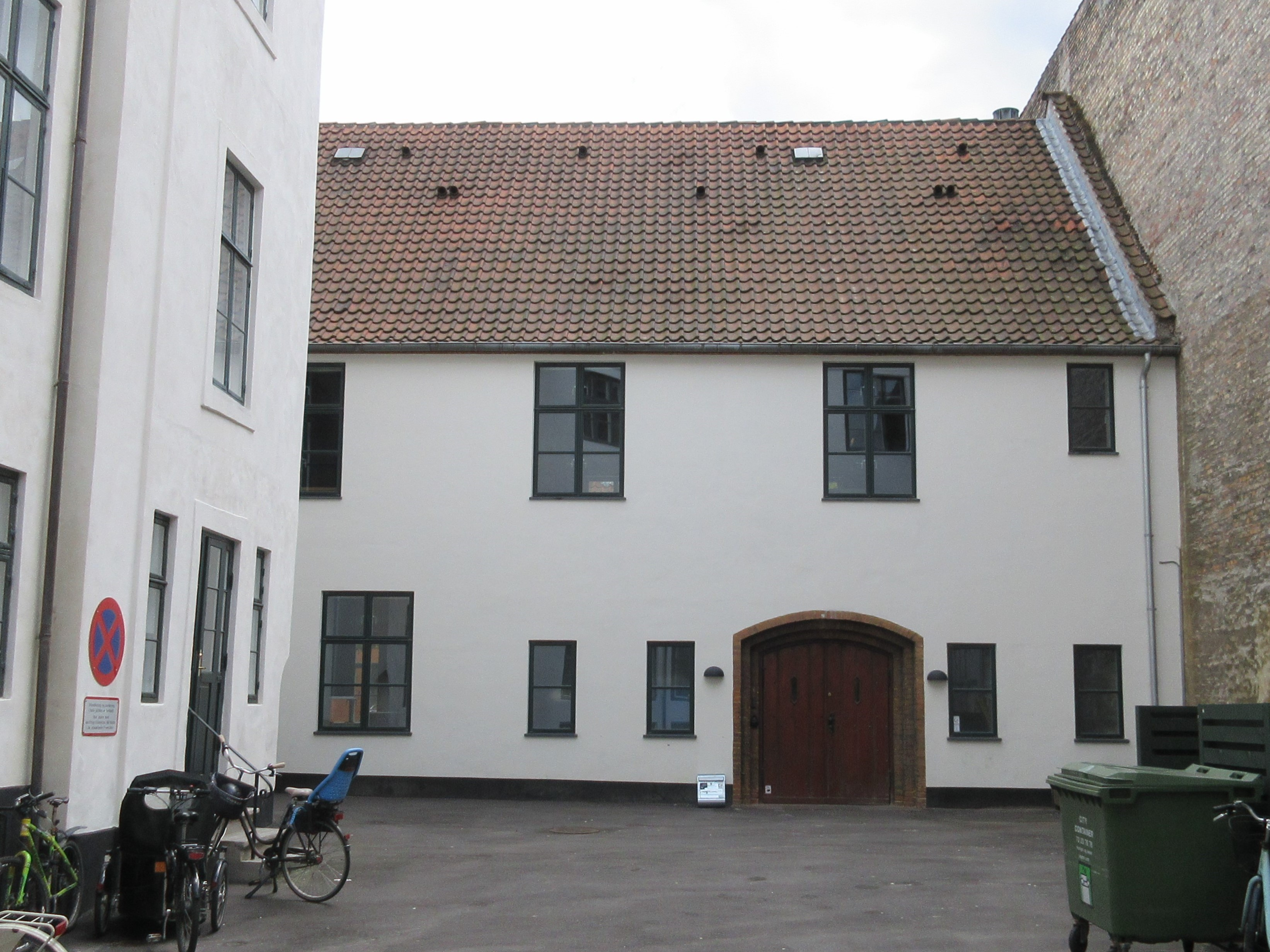
No. 9C: The low building at the bottom of the courtyard

Ny Kongensgade 9 consists of three storeys over a walk-out basement. The facade is dressed in a pale sand colour over a black-painted plinth. The mansard roof is clad with black-glazed tiles towards the street and has a dentillated cornice. The three central bays are accentuated by a median risalit with four giant order Ionic pilasters on the upper floors. The pilasters are supported by a band with acanthus decorations, the latter of which were added in 1854. Between the pilasters runs a sill cornice below the windows on the second floor. The two outer bays are wider than the three central ones. Their windows are accentuated by window frames and sills in sandstone and the windows of the bel étage are additionally topped by a pediment. The outer bays of the ground floor are flanked by smooth pilasters. The one to the left (west) is an arch-headed gate. The one to the right (east) features a window and a cellar entrance with a small sandstone canopy. A six-bay side wing extends from the rear side of the building. It adjoins another building which is again connected to a two-storey building at the bottom of the courtyard (No. 9C). The western margin is defined by a half-timbered wall of the side wing at No. 11.

== Today ==
The building is rented out as office space. The low building at No. 9C is rented out as a venue for parties, meetings and other events.
