= Falck (surname) =

Falck is a surname. Notable people with the surname include:

- Anton Reinhard Falck (1777–1843), Dutch statesman
- Cats Falck (1953–1984), Swedish journalist
- Enrico Falck (1899–1953), Italian entrepreneur, president of Falck Industries
- Eva Falck (1764–1810), Finnish innkeeper, hotelier and banker
- Hildegard Falck (born 1949), German athlete
- Iman Willem Falck (1736–1785), Dutch governor of Ceylon
- Isak Lauritssøn Falck (1601–1669), Norwegian landowner and timber merchant
- Jeremias Falck (1609/1610–1677), Baroque painter
- Johan Peter Falk (sometimes spelled Falck, 1733–1774), Swedish botanist
- Niels Nikolaus Falck (1784–1850), Danish jurist and historian
- Richard Falck (1868–1955), Prussian-born American botanist and mycologist
- Sophus Falck, founder of Falck A/S
- Wolfgang Falck (1910–2007), German Luftwaffe aviator
