= Rudolf Pichlmayr =

German surgeon (1932–1997)

Rudolf Pichlmayer (16 May 1932 in Munich, Germany – 29 August 1997 in Acapulco, Mexico) was a German surgeon and head of the Abdominal and Transplantation Surgery Department of the Hannover Medical School. He was one of the leading transplant physicians in Germany. He is considered a pioneer in liver transplantation. The introduction of the term "transplantation medicine" goes back to Pichlmayr.

== Life ==
Rudolf Pichlmayr grew up in Munich and studied medicine at the Ludwig-Maximilians-Universität München (LMU) from 1951 to 1956. He then worked as an assistant doctor in pathology and pediatric surgery before joining Rudolf Zenker at the surgical clinic of the LMU in 1960. Pichlmayr's main focus in training at Zenker was the treatment of immunological problems that occur in the form of rejection reactions after transplantation of foreign tissue. His habilitation thesis was groundbreaking for the development of early immunosuppressive methods. For example, the first heart transplantation by Christiaan Barnard in 1967 used the antilymphocytic globulins developed by Pichlmayr. The head of the Institute of Surgical Research at LMU, Walter Brendel, at whose institute Pichlmayr was involved in the development of this antilymphocytic serum (ALS), was also involved in the development of this antilymphocytic globulin.

In 1968, he moved from Munich to Hanover to the Hannover Medical School (MHH), where he worked in the Department of Thoracic Surgery under Hans Georg Borst. Just one year later he was head of the Department of Special Surgery and Transplantation. In 1973, Pichlmayr finally became full professor at the Department of Abdominal and Transplant Surgery. Under his leadership, the institute became one of the world's leading research centers in transplant medicine. Numerous surgical techniques were developed here. In 1988, Pichlmayr performed the world's first so-called split-liver transplantation, in which the donor liver was divided and implanted into two transplant recipients. During his time at the MHH he was involved in 4,278 transplantations of liver, kidney and pancreas.

Together with his wife Ina, he founded the "Foundation Rehabilitation after Organ Transplantation in Children and Adolescents" (later "Rudolf Pichlmayr Foundation"), which is dedicated to the physical and psychological convalescence of children and adolescents after organ transplantation. In 1990, the foundation acquired a farm, which was subsequently converted into the Ederhof Rehabilitation Center.

Pichlmayr has received numerous awards, including the Ernst Jung Prize in 1985, the Erich Lexer Prize, the Lucie Bolte Prize in 1986 and the Lower Saxony Prize in 1987. His postdoctoral thesis on Production and Effects of Heterologous Anti-Dog Lymphocyte Serum in 1968 received the von Langenbeck Award – the most prestigious recognition of the German Society for Surgery. He also won the Bruno Kreisky Prize for Services to Human Rights in 1993. In 1986, he was elected a member of the Leopoldina. He was also a member of the Central Ethics Commission at the German Medical Association. In 1990, Pichlmayr was elected "Physician of the Year" in Germany. Most recently, he was president of the German Society of Surgery.

Rudolf Pichlmayr died during a stay in Mexico during the 37th World Congress of Surgery in Acapulco while swimming in the morning. On January 12, 2006, Alexis-Carrel-Street in Hanover was renamed "Rudolf-Pichlmayr-Street".

== Publications (selection) ==
- Production and Effects of Heterologous Anti-Dog Lymphocyte Serum in 1968
- Treatment outcome of palliative (R1/R2) resection of stomach carcinoma, Feb. 1996
- Surgical activity for blunt injuries of the liver, Jan. 1987
