= Ina Pichlmayr =

German anaesthesiologist

Ina Pichlmayr (born 1932 in Wahlstatt, Silesia) is a German anesthesiologist and professor of medicine. She is co-founder of the Rehabilitation Center Ederhof, a special hospital in Iselsberg-Stronach (East Tyrol) for the rehabilitation of children and adolescents and their parents before and after organ transplantation.

== Life ==
Ina Pichlmayr studied medicine at the Ludwig-Maximilians-Universität München from 1950 and graduated with a doctorate in 1956. From 1957 to 1958, she initially worked as a medical assistant and then completed her residency at the Department of Anesthesiology at the Surgical University Hospital in Munich from 1959 to 1963. From 1961, Pichlmayr was the first senior physician there. After her habilitation in 1968, she moved to the Hannover Medical School (MHH) in 1971. Here she became professor of anesthesiology in 1972. From 1974 until her retirement in 1997, she was head of the Department of Anesthesiology IV of the Institute of Anesthesiology of the MHH.

Together with her husband, the surgeon Rudolf Pichlmayr, she founded the Ederhof, a foundation for the rehabilitation of children and adolescents and their parents before and after organ transplantation. After the death of her husband, she took over its management until 2001.

Pichlmayr is the mother of five daughters.

In 2010, the mentoring program for young female scientists (Mentoring-Programm für Nachwuchswissenschaftlerinnen der MHH) at the MHH was renamed Ina-Pichlmayr-Mentoring (IPM).

== Publications (selection) ==
- with Peter Lehmkuhl: EEG-Überwachung des Intensivpatienten. Springer, Berlin/Heidelberg 1988, ISBN 978-3-540-18593-2
- with Sabine Jeck-Thole: EEG-Leitfaden für Anästhesisten. Thieme, Stuttgart 1990, ISBN 978-3-13-740801-7
- with Rudolf Pichlmayr: Lebenschance Organtransplantation. Wissenswertes über Durchführung und Probleme der Organtransplantation. Thieme Verlag, Stuttgart 1991, ISBN 978-3-89373-146-6
- with Sabine Jeck-Thole, Ingrid Halbaum: Checkliste Anästhesiologie. Thieme Verlag, Stuttgart 1992, ISBN 978-3-13-770201-6
