= Falk =

Falk may refer to:

- Falk (name), including origin and list of people with this name
- Falk Archaeological District, historic town and lumber mill site
- Falk Township, Minnesota
- "Falk" (short story), a 1901 short story by Joseph Conrad
- Postal abbreviation of Falkirk, an area of Scotland

== See also ==
- Falx (disambiguation)
- Faulk (disambiguation)
- Falck (disambiguation)
