= Falck =

Falck may refer to:

- Falck (surname)
- Falck (Danish company), Danish emergency service corporation
- Falck Group, Italian steel mill company
- Falck Renewables, Italian renewable energy project developer
- Falck USA, American emergency services company
- Group 4 Falck, Danish security company
- Falck, Moselle, commune of the Moselle département in France

== See also ==
- Falk (disambiguation)
