= Latif Dori =

Israeli activist

- לטיף דורי
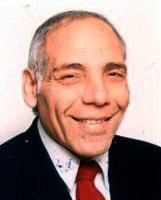
- Born: 1934; Iraq
- Died: 5 July 2023 (aged 88–89)
- Occupation: Activist
- Political party: Mapam

Latif Dori (Hebrew: לטיף דורי) was an Israeli peace activist and Mapam member.

== Biography ==
=== Early life ===
Latif-Menashe Dori was born in Iraq in 1934. He immigrated to Israel in 1951. The following year, he joined the HaShomer HaTzair movement, and helped establish cadres of the movement in the Hiriya and Sakia ma'abarot. In 1954, he participated in the founding of the Arab Pioneer Youth Movement, which, through the concept of working class solidarity, sought to help bring Palestinian youth with Israeli citizenship to live, work, and study on kibbutzim.

=== Mapam activism ===
He joined the left-wing Mapam party in 1955, rising through its ranks to become the head of its Department of Arab Affairs. In late October 1956, Mapam heard troubling rumours of an Israeli military operation in Kafr Qasim, a majority Arab citizens of Israel town near Tel Aviv, assigning Dori to investigate. After Dori was blocked from entering the town by the Israeli military, he snuck in, and found that the Israeli Border Police had murdered a significant number of civilians. He subsequently played a key role in bringing the massacre to light, despite the Israeli government having banned reporting on the event.

=== Peace activism ===
In November 1986, he joined 28 other Israelis, including journalist Yael Lotan, in travelling to Bucharest, Socialist Republic of Romania, to attend a symposium on the Israeli-Palestinian conflict organised by the Writers' Union of Romania. The symposium was also attended by Mohammed Milhim, former mayor of Halhul and member of the Executive Committee of the Palestine Liberation Organization.

In June 1987, he held a press conference with former American Hezbollah hostage in Lebanon Benjamin Weir and Palestinian lawyer Tawfiq Abu Ghazaleh in which they denounced the Israeli occupation of Palestinian and called for an international peace conference that included the PLO.

In early June 1988, the four defendants were found guilty of violating the Prevention of Terror Ordinance.

=== Death ===
Dori died on 5 July 2023.

== Awards and recognition ==
In 1996, he was made an honorary citizen of Kafr Qasim.
