= Faulks =

Faulks may refer to:

- Ben Faulks (born 1979), English actor
- Edward Faulks, Baron Faulks (born 1950), English lawyer and politician
- Neville Faulks (1908–1985), English judge
- Peter Faulks (born 1988), Australian rules footballer
- Sebastian Faulks (born 1953), British novelist and journalist

== See also ==
- Faulk (disambiguation)
