= Hans Georg Borst =

German cardiothoracic surgeon (1927–2022)

- Born: October 17, 1927; Munich, Bavaria, Germany
- Died: September 8, 2022 (aged 94)
- Education: Harvard Medical School (MD, 1953); LMU Munich (Dr. med., 1957)
- Medical career
- Field: Cardiothoracic surgery
- Institutions: Hannover Medical School

Hans Georg Borst (17 October 1927 – 8 September 2022) was a German cardiothoracic surgeon and professor at Hannover Medical School (MHH). Borst is best known for introducing the aortic elephant trunk technique and for establishing heart and lung transplantation programs at MHH in 1980s.

== Life and career ==
Borst was born in Munich, the son of pathologist Max Borst. After preclinical studies at LMU Munich, he received a stipend to Harvard Medical School, where he earned an MD in 1953, and then trained at Stanford Hospital and at the Harvard School of Public Health. Returning to Germany, he worked with Rudolf Zenker in Marburg and Munich before moving in 1968 to the MHH, where he led the Department of Thoracic, Cardiac and Vascular Surgery from 1972 until his retirement in 1996.

At MHH, Borst helped build the centre for surgery on a departmental model and oversaw the growth of advanced cardiac and aortic surgery. In 1983 his team performed MHH’s first heart transplantation, and in 1987 MHH carried out its first bilateral lung transplantation in the German-speaking world, helping establish the institution as a European leader in thoracic organ transplantation.

Borst died on 8 September 2022 at the age of 94.

== Honours and recognition ==
Borst served as President of the European Association for Cardio-Thoracic Surgery in 1995. He received multiple professional honours in Germany and abroad, including the Paracelsus Medal of the German Medical Association in 2018 for lifetime contributions to cardiac, paediatric cardiac and coronary surgery and to transplantation and aortic surgery. Obituaries in professional outlets highlighted his influence on aortic surgery and on the development of transplantation in Germany.
