= Nederlandse Veiligheidsdienst =

Dutch private security firm

- Industry: Security
- Founded: 1911; 115 years ago
- Defunct: 1999; 27 years ago
- Fate: Sold to Falck
- Area served: Worldwide
- Key people: Ernst van der Lee

Nederlandse Veiligheidsdienst was the largest Dutch private security firm between 1911 and 1999. Ernst van der Lee started the organisation under the name Gecombineerde Nachtveiligheidsdienst (GNVD).

== History ==
The company was founded in 1911 by Ernst van der Lee as the 1e Gecombineerde Nachtveiligheidsdienst (GNVD). Until World War II, the small firm consisted of approximately forty night watchmen who patrolled on foot or by bicycle, sometimes accompanied by dogs, along official residences and embassies in The Hague. This enterprise's clientele included several ministries as well as the private residences of ministers and prime ministers.

== Merger ==
The Nederlandse Veiligheidsdienst was sold in 1999 to the Falck Group. Falck already owned Group 4 and Securicor these two companies merged to become Group 4 Securicor. In 2004, the merger was only allowed by the Netherlands Competition Authority if parts of the company were sold to prevent a monopoly in the securities business. Falck Security & Services, was sold to Facilicom. This resulted in Nederlandse Veiligheidsdienst being renamed Trigion.
