= SMS Pommerania =

Aviso of the Prussian and German Imperial Navy

- Pommerania in 1887

Class overview
- Operators: North German Federal Navy; Imperial German Navy
- Preceded by: SMS Falke
- Succeeded by: SMS Zieten
- Completed: 1
- Retired: 1

History
- Name: Pommerania
- Builder: AG Vulcan
- Laid down: 1864
- Launched: September 1864
- Commissioned: 27 April 1871
- Decommissioned: 16 October 1889
- In service: 1 May 1865
- Renamed: Adler, 1892
- Stricken: 10 August 1890
- Fate: Sold, 1892, converted into a merchant ship and sank with all hands, 20 January 1894

General characteristics
- Class & type: Unique aviso
- Displacement: Design: 391 metric tons (385 long tons); Full load: 460 t (450 long tons)
- Length: 55.2 m (181 ft 1 in) loa
- Beam: 6.9 m (22 ft 8 in)
- Draft: 2.35 m (7 ft 9 in)
- Installed power: 2 × boilers; 700 metric horsepower (690 ihp)
- Propulsion: 1 × marine steam engine; 2 paddle wheels
- Speed: 14.5 knots (26.9 km/h; 16.7 mph)
- Range: 300 nautical miles (560 km; 350 mi) at 14 knots (26 km/h; 16 mph)
- Complement: 4 officers; 61 enlisted men
- Armament: 2 × 8 cm (3.1 in) hoop guns

SMS Pommerania was a paddle steamer originally built for use as a packet ship but was acquired by the North German Federal Navy in 1870 during the Franco-Prussian War. Commissioned too late to see service during the conflict, she was initially used to conduct fishery surveys that were later used as the basis for the German Fisheries Act in 1874. Pommerania went to the Mediterranean Sea in 1876 in response to the murder of a German diplomat and remained in the region to observe the Russo-Turkish War of 1877–1878. After returning to Germany in 1879, she spent much of the 1880s either operating as a fishery protection vessel or conducting surveys of the German coastline. Decommissioned in 1889, she was struck from the naval register in 1890, sold in 1892, and was converted into a sailing schooner. She was renamed Adler, but was lost with all hands on her first voyage as a merchant ship in January 1894.

== Design ==
The early history of Pommerania is poorly recorded, as few official records concerning her construction have survived. The ship was originally built for the packet service between Stettin and Stockholm; her design was prepared by the Prussian Navy's chief designer, Carl Elbertzhagen, in 1863. The navy also assumed the cost of construction; the naval historians Hans Hildebrand, Albert Röhr, and Hans-Otto Steinmetz state that the fact that the Prussian Navy bore the cost of construction and designed the ship suggests that the naval command wanted to have access to a steamship that it could use as needed. She was requisitioned during the Franco-Prussian War in 1870 as what was by then the North German Federal Navy sought to acquire ships with which it could defend the North German Confederation's coast in the North and Baltic Seas. Pommerania was among four merchant ships purchased by the navy, along with the paddle steamer Falke and the HAPAG passenger liners Cuxhaven and Helgoland.

=== Characteristics ===
Pommerania was 50.5 m (165 ft 8 in) long at the waterline and 55.2 m (181 ft 1 in) long overall. She had a beam of 6.9 m (22 ft 8 in) over her hull and 9.7 m (31 ft 10 in) over the boxes for her paddle wheels. Her draft was 2.35 m (7 ft 9 in). As designed, she displaced 391 metric tons (385 long tons) and at full load, this increased to 460 t (450 long tons). Her iron hull was constructed with transverse frames; the number of watertight compartments has not survived. Steering was controlled with a single rudder.

The ship was a good sea boat and was very maneuverable, but she handled poorly in severe weather. She was difficult to control and lost considerable speed in a head sea, and she tended to ship large quantities of water forward. To supplement her steam engine, she carried a schooner rig, but it contributed little to her performance. These problems were typical of paddle steamers. The ship had a crew of four officers and sixty-one enlisted men. She carried four smaller boats of unrecorded type.

Pommerania's propulsion system consisted of one vertical, oscillating 2-cylinder marine steam engine that drove a pair of paddle wheels located amidships. The wheels were 6.55 m (21 ft 6 in) in diameter, with ten paddles each. Steam for the engine was provided by two coal-fired trunk boilers. The engine and boilers were placed in a combined engine/boiler room, and the boilers were each ducted into their own funnel. The system was rated at 300 nominal horsepower. In service, she was capable of 700 metric horsepower (690 ihp) and a top speed of 14.5 knots (26.9 km/h; 16.7 mph). She could carry up to 75 t (74 long tons) of coal, which allowed a cruising radius of 300 nautical miles (560 km; 350 mi) at a speed of 14 knots (26 km/h; 16 mph).

The ship was armed with a pair of 8 cm (3.1 in) 23-caliber (cal.) breechloading hoop guns that were supplied with 120 shells. Later in her career, these were replaced with a pair of 8.7 cm (3.4 in) 24-cal. hoop guns. She also received four 3.7 cm (1.5 in) Hotchkiss revolver cannon in 1880.

== Service history ==
Pommerania was laid down at the AG Vulcan shipyard in Stettin in 1864. She was launched in September that year and entered service on 1 May 1865 with the North German postal service, operating on the Stettin–Stockholm route for the next five years. During this period, she ran aground off Hiddensee in early September 1868 and had to be pulled free. By the late 1860s, the aviso Loreley was worn out and in need of a lengthy reconstruction; on 2 July 1870, the naval command instructed Korvettenkapitän (KK—Corvette captain) Franz von Waldersee to examine Pommerania to determine if she could be a suitable replacement while Loreley was out of service. Waldersee's trials were underway when war with France broke out on 19 July, and the North German Federal Navy requisitioned the vessel on 20 August at no cost. Crew shortages and a lack of equipment during the conflict delayed conversion of the vessel into a warship until 27 April 1871, by which time the war had ended in German victory and creation of the German Empire.

The German Fisheries Association requested a commission to conduct research in the North and Baltic Seas and the navy—now the Imperial Navy—provided Pommerania for the work. She left Kiel in mid-June 1871 for the first research trip, which took the ship into the Skagerrak, to Stockholm, and then to the coast of Courland. From there, she proceeded to Friedrichsort in the Kieler Förde, where the survey work ended owing to an outbreak of cholera among the crew, forcing Pommerania to go into quarantine. In the course of the voyage, the ship had traveled 2,800 nautical miles (5,200 km; 3,200 mi). The ship was recommissioned on 11 July 1872 for another fishing survey expedition that began ten days later. After departing Kiel, she steamed through the Kattegat and Skagerrak to Bergen, Norway. She then steamed south across the Dogger Bank to Den Helder in the Netherlands, followed by a stop in British Helgoland. From there, she proceeded to Wilhelmshaven and then back through the Skagerrak and Kattegat to Kiel, arriving there on 10 September, having traveled 2,500 nmi (4,600 km; 2,900 mi). She was decommissioned there on 21 September. The two expeditions provided the basis for the Fisheries Act of 1874. Pommerania was recommissioned in 1873 to conduct surveys of the Mecklenburg coast, but she had to return to port for repairs in May after suffering machinery problems.

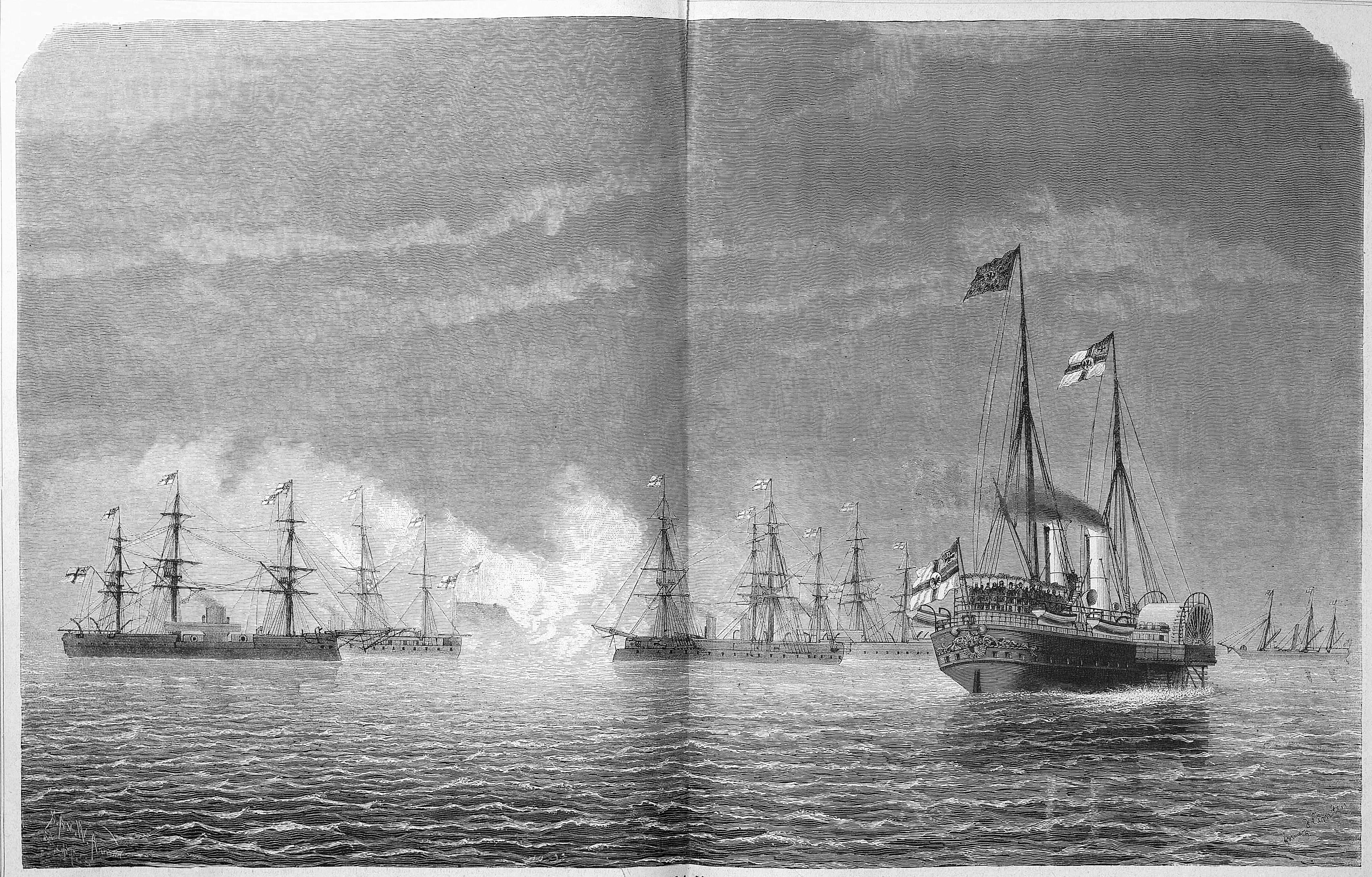
Sketch of the German fleet conducting maneuvers

Pommerania remained out of service until 1 May 1876, when she was recommissioned to join the ironclad training squadron. The ships were sent to Salonika in the Ottoman Empire in response to the murder of the German consul there. On the way there, Pommerania stopped in Algiers on 12 June, which was one of the first times a German warship had stopped in a French port following the Franco-Prussian War. The German ships were joined by French, Russian, Italian, and Austro-Hungarian warships in an international demonstration condemning the murder. Most of the German vessels left in August, but Pommerania and the ironclad Friedrich Carl remained in the eastern Mediterranean, first off the Levant and then stopping in Smyrna. On 15 November, Pommerania went to the Ottoman capital, Constantinople, where she served as the second station ship along with Loreley. She remained there until early March 1877, when she returned to Smyrna. On 16 May, Pommerania steamed back to Constantinople in response to the start of the Russo-Turkish War of 1877–1878. She stayed in Constantinople until 12 June 1879, when she began the voyage back to Germany, arriving in Wilhelmshaven and being decommissioned there on 9 August.

The ship was recommissioned on 25 August 1881 to serve as a tender for the Marinestation der Nordsee (North Sea Naval Station); she served in this capacity for the next three years without incident and was decommissioned again on 24 April 1884. During this period, Kapitänleutnant (Lieutenant Captain) Karl Ascher served as the ship's commander from April to May 1884. From 25 March to 30 September 1885, she served as a fishery protection vessel in the North Sea. She repeatedly intervened to stop British fishing vessels from illegally operating in German territorial waters off the East Frisian Islands. In late August, these duties were interrupted so Pommerania could participate in the annual fleet training exercises. She served as a survey vessel from 8 April to 12 October 1886, operating along Germany's North and Baltic Sea coasts. She conducted further surveying work in the Baltic beginning on 13 April 1887, and in June, she went to Kiel to participate in the ceremonial start of construction of the Kaiser Wilhelm Canal. The canal's namesake, Wilhelm I, came aboard Pommerania to observe a naval review; this was the last time he visited the fleet. Pommerania was decommissioned in Kiel on 15 October, returning to service again in 1888 and 1889 for more survey work. She was decommissioned for the last time on 16 October 1889 and was struck from the naval register on 10 August 1890. She was sold in 1892 to a Hamburg-based company and converted into a three-masted sailing schooner. Renamed Adler, the ship was operated by the firm Paulsen & Ivers, based in Kiel. On her first voyage, she sank in a storm on 20 January 1894 with the loss of her entire crew.
