= Faulk =

Faulk may refer to:

== People ==
- Andrew Jackson Faulk (1814–1898), 3rd Governor of Dakota Territory
- Clarence Faulk (1909–2010), American journalist and broadcaster
- Henry Faulk (1907–2001), Head of programme to "re-educate" German Prisoners of War held in England in World War II
- John Henry Faulk (1913–1990), American radio show host
- Justin Faulk (born 1992), American ice hockey player
- Keldric Faulk (born 2004), American football player
- Kevin Faulk (born 1976), American football player
- Marshall Faulk (born 1973), NFL American football player
- Mary Lena Faulk (1926–1995), American professional golfer
- Mike Faulk, American politician from Tennessee
- Trev Faulk (born 1981), American footballer

== Places ==
- Faulk County, South Dakota
  - Faulkton, South Dakota

== See also ==
- Faulks
- Falk (disambiguation)
