= SMS Falke =

Two ships of the German Kaiserliche Marine (Imperial Navy) and one of the Austro-Hungarian Navy have been named SMS Falke:

- SMS Falke (1865), a German aviso launched in 1865
- SMS Falke (1886), an Austro-Hungarian torpedo boat launched in 1886
- SMS Falke (1891), a German unprotected cruiser launched in 1891
