= Falke (spacecraft) =

German space research project

Falke test ship
- Country: Germany
- Status: cancelled
- First flight: September 6, 1990 (only flight)
- Crew members: none

Falke was a German program to fly a subscale model of the Space Shuttle orbiter in real conditions in order to obtain aerodynamic data in the frame of the preparation of the Hermes spaceplane. One flight test was performed in 1990.

== Organization ==
The program was funded by the German federal Ministry of Research. The leadership of the program was DLR. The flight model was produced by the German company OHB-System

== Flight model characteristics ==
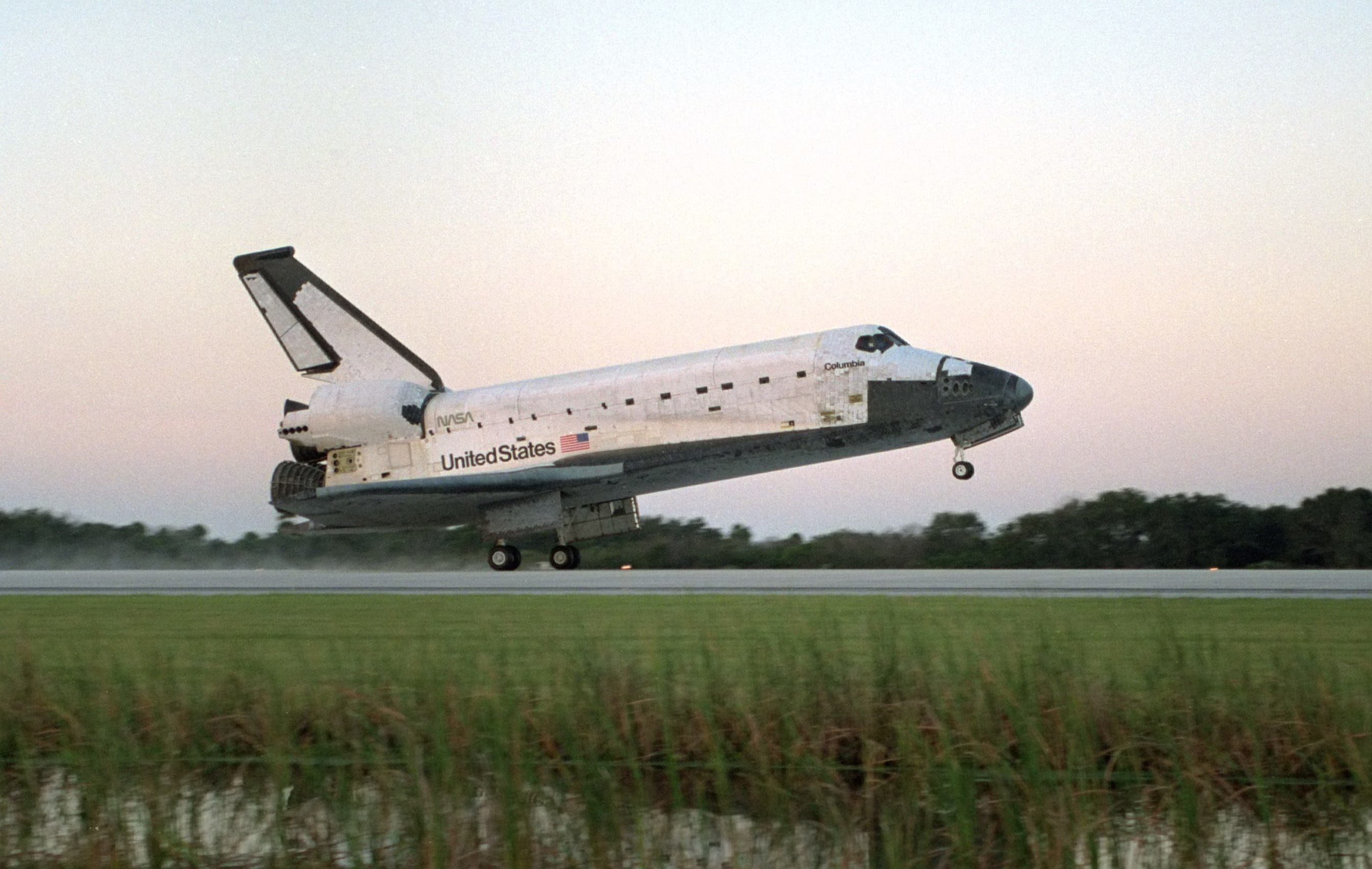
The Space Shuttle, whose shape was used for Falke

- Length 6.8 m (22 ft)
- Wing span 4.4 m (14 ft)
- Height 2.6 m (8 ft 6 in)
- Mass 730 kg (1,610 lb)

The shape of Falke was that of the Space Shuttle orbiter with a 1/5 scale factor. Falke had its own power, an autopilot and a computer to control the hydraulically actuated flight control surfaces of the spaceplane.

The sensor suite of Falke was measuring attitude, temperature, flux, pressure and acceleration.

CNES was tracking Falke by radar and telemetry.

== Flight history ==
The only flight of Falke took place on September 6, 1990. French space agency CNES launched a stratospheric balloon from its Aire-sur-l'Adour center carrying Falke. After a 2 h 43 m ascent, Falke was released at an altitude of 38.8 km (24.1 mi).

At the end of the flight, a parachute was deployed at an altitude of 6 km and Falke landed in horizontal position on airbags.

== Outcome ==
Three further flights were planned, but they were cancelled when the European Space Agency cancelled Hermes.
