= Phalke =

Maratha clan of Maharashtra

Phalke is a Maratha clan among 96 clans of the Maratha community of Maharashtra and states bordering to it.

== Notable ==
- Dadasaheb Phalke (1870–1944), Indian producer, director, and screenwriter
- Rohit Phalke (born 1997), Indian actor, writer, and director

== See also ==
- Marathi people
- Maratha Empire
- List of Maratha dynasties and states
- Bhonsle
- Gaekwad
- Scindia
- Puars
- Holkar
