= Valke =

Valke may refer to:

- Michel Valke (1959–), a Dutch footballer.
- Valke (rugby union), a South African rugby union.
