= SMS Falke (1865) =

Aviso of the Prussian and German Imperial Navy

Class overview
- Operators: North German Federal Navy; Imperial German Navy
- Preceded by: SMS Loreley
- Succeeded by: SMS Pommerania
- Completed: 1
- Retired: 1

History
- Name: Falke
- Builder: Henderson, Coulborn and Company
- Launched: 1865
- Acquired: 25 August 1870
- Commissioned: 4 October 1870
- Decommissioned: 1888
- Stricken: 18 November 1890
- Fate: Broken up for scrap, 1892

General characteristics
- Class & type: Aviso
- Displacement: Design: 1,002 t (986 long tons); Full load: 1,230 t (1,210 long tons)
- Length: 78.4 m (257 ft 3 in) loa
- Beam: 8.56 m (28 ft 1 in)
- Draft: 2.6 m (8 ft 6 in)
- Installed power: 1,100 PS (1,100 ihp); 2 × boilers
- Propulsion: 1 × marine steam engine; 2 × paddle wheels
- Speed: 15 knots (28 km/h; 17 mph)
- Range: 1,400 nmi (2,600 km; 1,600 mi) at 12 kn (22 km/h; 14 mph)
- Complement: 6 officers; 84 enlisted men
- Armament: 2 × 12 cm (4.7 in) breechloading guns

SMS Falke (Note: "SMS" stands for "Seiner Majestät Schiff", or "His Majesty's Ship" in German.) was an aviso of the North German Federal Navy and later the German Imperial Navy that was built in the mid-1860s. Originally built on speculation as a blockade runner for the Confederate States of America during the American Civil War, she was not sold before the war ended and a shipowner in the Netherlands instead purchased the vessel. The ship's owner renamed the ship Heinrich Heister, though he made no use of her. In 1870, following the outbreak of the Franco-Prussian War, the North German Navy was in search of vessels to augment its fleet and acquired Heinrich Heister, transferred her to Emden, briefly renaming her Emden to obscure the ship's movements, before being converted into an armed aviso with her intended name, Falke. Her wartime service was cut short by an accidental ramming by the ironclad warship SMS Arminius, sending Falke into dock for repairs.

She was next commissioned in 1875; she spent the next six years in active service either with the main fleet, as a tender, or as a fishery protection ship, being decommissioned toward the end of each year for the winter. She had repeated problems with her propulsion system during this period, and in 1879, she was involved in experiments with electrical lighting, making her the first German warship to be equipped with a searchlight. Laid up from 1882 through 1885, she was recommissioned in early 1886 for fishery protection duties, a role she filled for the next three years. She left service for the last time in late 1888, was struck from the naval register in 1890, and sold for scrap in 1892.

== Design ==
Falke was requisitioned during the Franco-Prussian War in 1870 as what was by then the North German Federal Navy sought to acquire ships with which it could defend the North German Confederation's coast in the North and Baltic Seas. Falke was among four merchant ships purchased by the navy, along with the paddle steamer SMS Pommerania and the HAPAG passenger liners Cuxhaven and Helgoland.

=== Characteristics ===
Falke was 77.5 m (254 ft 3 in) long at the waterline and 78.4 m (257 ft 3 in) long overall. She had a beam of 8.56 m (28 ft 1 in) over the hull and 11.7 m (38 ft 5 in) over the wheel boxes for the paddle wheels. Her draft was 2.6 m (8 ft 6 in) forward and 2.5 m (8 ft 2 in) aft. She displaced 1,002 metric tons (986 long tons) as designed and up to 1,230 t (1,210 long tons) at full load. The hull was constructed with transverse iron frames and was divided into six watertight compartments. Steering was controlled with a single rudder.

The ship's crew consisted of six officers and eighty-four enlisted men. She carried four small boats of unrecorded type. Falke was a good sea boat, but was difficult to turn. She lost little speed in a head sea, though a beam sea caused considerable loss of speed. To supplement her steam engine, she carried a schooner rig, but it contributed little to her performance. These problems were typical of paddle steamers.

Falke's propulsion system consisted of one vertical, oscillating 2-cylinder marine steam engine that drove a pair of paddle wheels located amidships. The wheels were 6.55 m (21 ft 6 in) in diameter, with ten paddles each. Steam for the engine was provided by two coal-fired trunk boilers fitted with superheaters. The engine and boilers were placed in a combined engine/boiler room, and the boilers were each ducted into their own funnel. The system was rated at 300 nominal horsepower for a top speed of 12 knots (22 km/h; 14 mph). In service, she was capable of 1,100 metric horsepower (1,100 ihp) and a top speed of 15 knots (28 km/h; 17 mph). She could carry up to 200 t (200 long tons) of coal, which allowed a cruising radius of 1,400 nautical miles (2,600 km; 1,600 mi) at a speed of 12 knots.

The ship was armed with a pair of 12 cm (4.7 in) 23-caliber breechloading hoop guns that were supplied with 670 shells. The guns had a range of 5,000 m (16,000 ft). Later in her career, she received five 3.7 cm (1.5 in) Hotchkiss revolver cannons.

== Service history ==
=== Construction and purchase ===
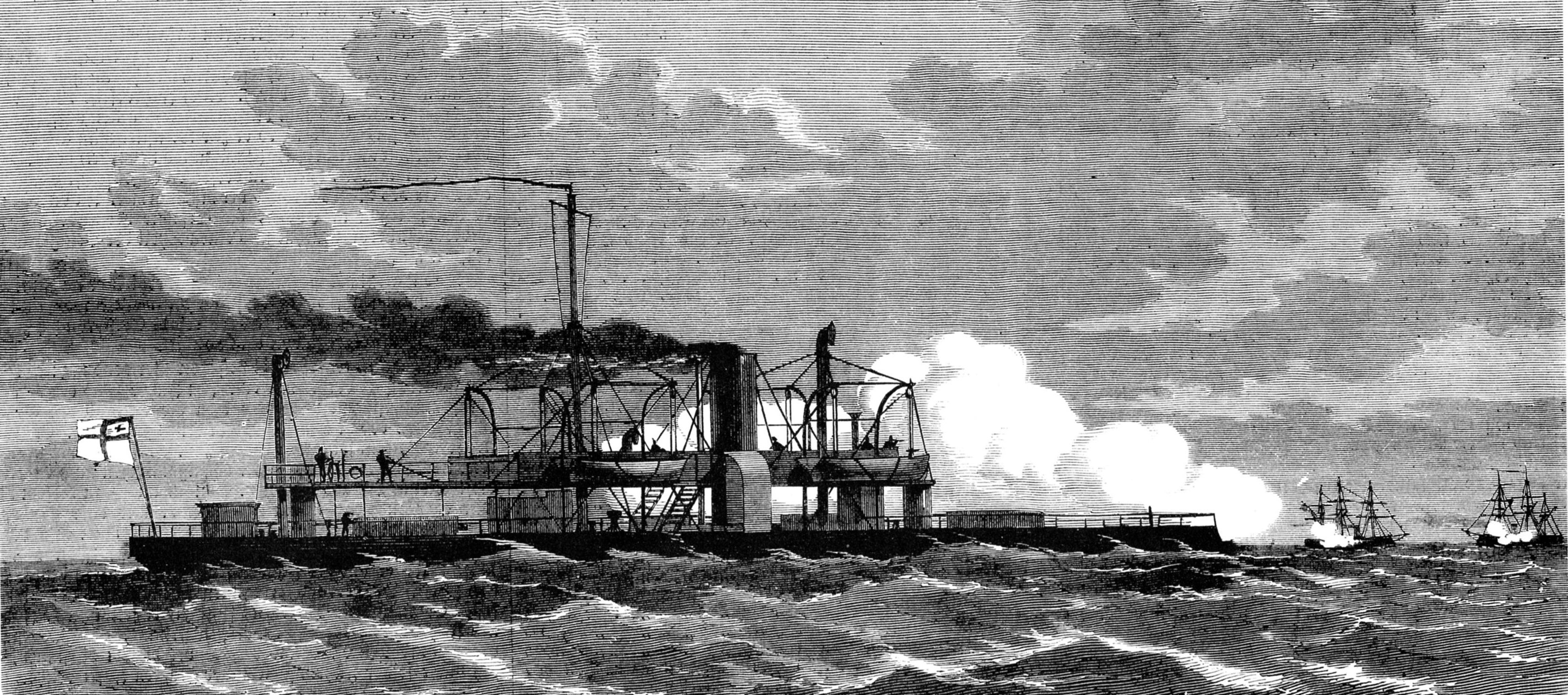
The turret ship Arminius rammed Falke and ended her wartime service in 1870

Falke was originally built in 1865 as a speculative venture by Henderson, Coulborn and Company of Renfrew, Scotland. Her builders intended to sell her to the Confederate States of America for use as a blockade runner during the American Civil War, but the war ended before the vessel could be sold. She was instead sold to a shipowner in Rotterdam, renamed Heinrich Heister, and laid up there. In late August 1870, shortly after the outbreak of the Franco-Prussian War, Korvettenkapitän (KK—Corvette captain) Franz von Waldersee was sent to secure fast steamships built abroad. German shipyards would not be able to complete vessels in time for use during the war, so vessels from neutral countries would have to be acquired. The North German Federal Navy planned to use the vessels as scouts for boats armed with towed torpedoes. Waldersee initially searched in Britain but could not find a suitable ship, though he learned of Heinrich Heister's presence in Rotterdam. Waldersee, under the name John Smith and stating himself to be from Britain, purchased the vessel on 25 August.

Waldersee hired a crew of Dutch seamen and declared his destination to be London, but after leaving Rotterdam, he ordered the crew to instead take the ship to Delfzijl, stating that his contractors wanted the ship to proceed there. From there, he took the ship to the mouth of the Ems river on 30 August, where he encountered a gunboat; after Waldersee explained the situation, the gunboat escorted Heinrich Heister upriver to Emden. They arrived there on 2 September, where the Dutch crew was sent home. The ship was temporarily renamed Emden to obscure the movement of the vessel and commissioned on 4 September so she could be transferred to the main naval base at Wilhelmshaven. There, she would be converted into a warship and fitted with guns. On 12 September, an order from the high command renamed her Falke. Conversion work was completed and on 4 October she was recommissioned. After returning to service, still under Waldersee's command, Falke conducted sea trials before embarking on 12 October on a sortie to attack the French blockade squadron in company with the ironclad turret ship Arminius. The operation ended in near disaster for Falke when Arminius accidentally rammed her while the vessels were leaving Jade Bay. Falke was badly damaged below the waterline; in a sinking condition, she returned to port with great difficulty. The only drydock in Wilhelmshaven was occupied until January 1871, preventing Falke from being repaired until then. After repairs were completed, Falke remained out of service for the next four years.

=== Active career ===
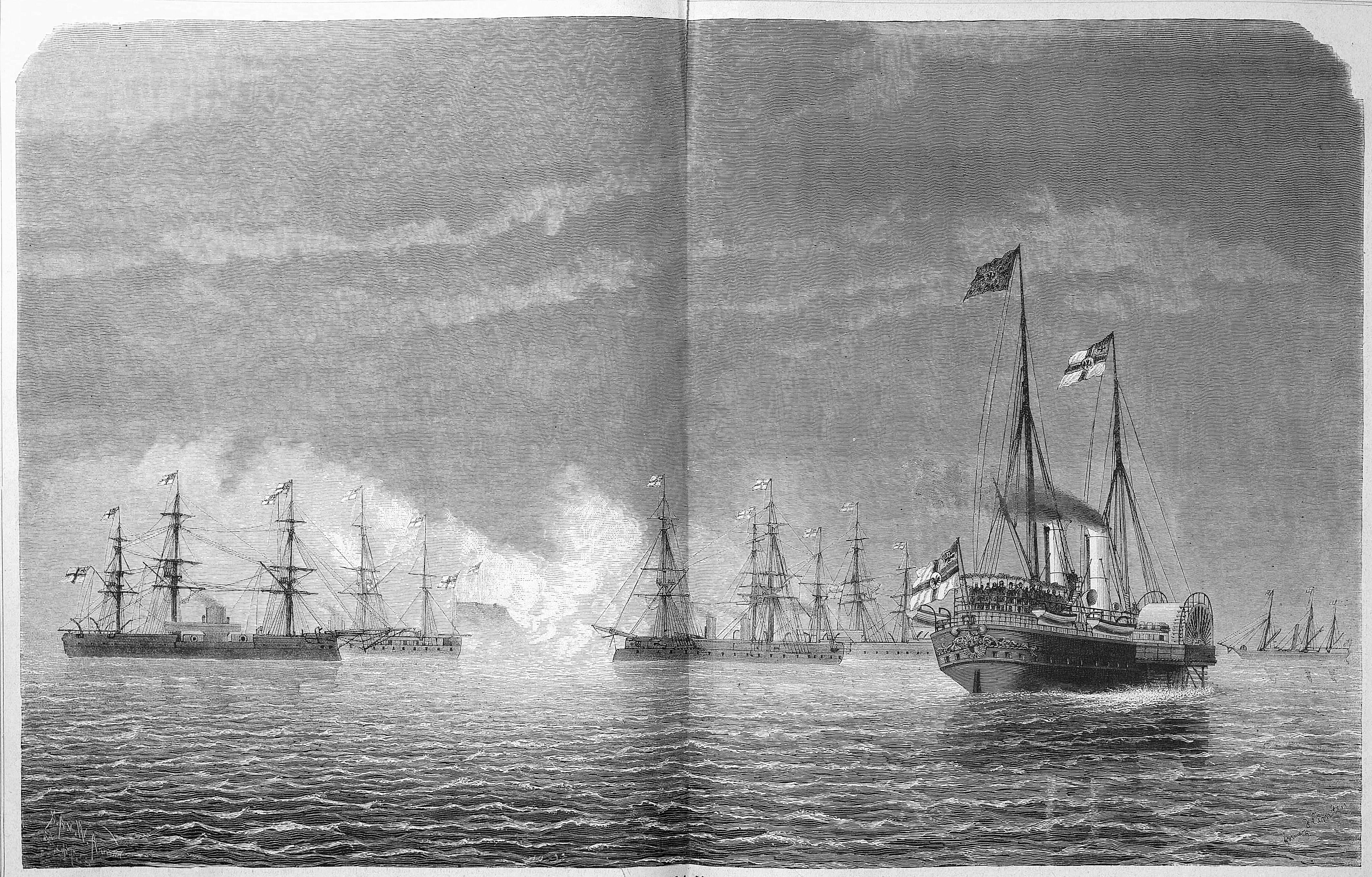
Sketch of the German fleet conducting maneuvers

Falke was recommissioned on 19 May 1875 for service as an aviso; by this time, experience with towed torpedoes had demonstrated to the German naval command that they were not effective weapons, and her originally envisioned role had been abandoned. She served with the ironclad training squadron from 3 June to the end of September. During this period, the squadron held maneuvers off Sassnitz that were observed by Kaiser Wilhelm I, during which Falke acted as a simulated enemy vessel. She was decommissioned for the year on 10 October in Wilhelmshaven. She spent 1876 out of service, but was recommissioned on 7 May 1877 for another year with the ironclad training squadron. She was to have left for the eastern Mediterranean Sea, but after getting underway she broke a connecting rod, forcing her to return to port for repairs. AG Weser of Bremen quickly manufactured a replacement rod and completed the repair within 24 hours, allowing Falke to get underway on 3 June, meeting the rest of the squadron in Gibraltar ten days later. She suffered another breakdown on the way back to Germany and had to stop in Malta for repairs. She arrived back in Wilhelmshaven on 25 October and was decommissioned there on 5 November. While out of service, she received new boilers and her engine was thoroughly overhauled.

On 27 May 1878, Falke was recommissioned once again to serve with the ironclad squadron for another Mediterranean cruise. Her engines broke down again upon getting underway on 29 May, forcing repairs that lasted another two days. Before she could depart on 31 May, she received word of the accidental sinking of the ironclad Grosser Kurfürst in a collision with the ironclad König Wilhelm off Folkestone, Britain, earlier that day. She joined the squadron in Portsmouth, Britain, where she embarked survivors of the sinking and carried them to Wilhelmshaven on 6 June. Konteradmiral (Rear Admiral) Carl Ferdinand Batsch, the squadron commander, and his staff were also ordered to return aboard Falke for an inquiry into the accident. The accident cancelled the planned training cruise and Falke remained in commission only through 17 July, during which time she served as a fishery protection ship in the North Sea. The following year, Falke returned to commission on 1 April to serve as a tender for the Marinestation der Nordsee (North Sea Naval Station). She was involved in experiments with electrical lights aboard warships, and she was the first German warship to be fitted with a searchlight. From 26 July to 28 August, she carried Prince Friedrich Karl to visit King Oscar II of Sweden–Norway.

From 1880 to 1881, Falke served in the same capacities as she had in the two previous years, primarily as a tender for the Marinestation. Kapitänleutnant (Lieutenant Captain) Friedrich von Baudissin served as the ship's commander from April to August 1881. During this period, on 26 April, following an explosion aboard the artillery school ship Mars in the Schillig roadstead, Falke ferried wounded crewmen from the ship to Wilhelmshaven. She was sent to western Scotland on 7 July to assist the HAPAG steamer SS Vandalia that was in distress, though by the time Falke arrived, a British steamer had come to Vandalia's aid. She was decommissioned for the year on 25 August, remaining out of service for the next two years. In 1883, the ship underwent major repairs, followed by limited sea trials from 2 to 20 October, before being decommissioned again. Falke was recommissioned on 24 March 1886 for fishery protection duty; she also served as a training ship for engineers. Decommissioned for the year on 30 September, she was recommissioned on 29 March 1887, once again to patrol German territorial waters. On 17 May, she stopped the British fishing boat Lady Goodwill for violating German waters. In 1888, Falke conducted a series of cruises in the North and Baltic Seas for members of the Admiralstab (Admiralty Staff). Decommissioned for the last time in late 1888, she was struck from the naval register on 18 November 1890 and sold for scrap in November 1892, thereafter being broken up.
