= Falké Bacharou =

Nigerien politician

Falké Bacharou is a Nigerien politician. A member of the Democratic and Social Convention (CDS-Rahama), he was Second Vice-President of the National Assembly of Niger from 2004 to 2009.

== Political career ==
Bacharou was elected to the National Assembly in the February 1993 parliamentary election as a CDS candidate in Dosso constituency. He then served as Secretary-General of the Presidency under President Mahamane Ousmane. He was the campaign director for the CDS during the January 1995 parliamentary election. After the CDS lost the election, depriving President Ousmane of a parliamentary majority and forcing him to cohabit with the opposition, Bacharou alleged that irregularities had affected the results. Ousmane was ousted a year later in a January 1996 military coup. Bacharou was one of those arrested following an opposition demonstration on January 11, 1997.

Bacharou was elected to the National Assembly in the December 2004 parliamentary election from Dosso, and he was elected as the Second Vice-President of the National Assembly for the parliamentary term that followed.

Bacharou was a National Vice-President of the CDS, representing Dosso, until he was replaced by Maïdagi Alambaye at the party's sixth congress on September 1, 2007.

Bacharou was again elected to the National Assembly in the January 2011 parliamentary election. When the Bureau of the National Assembly was elected in April 2011, the post of Second Vice-President, reserved for the opposition, was left vacant. Subsequently Bacharou was elected as Second Vice-President of the National Assembly.
