= Eva Falck =

Eva Falck (1764–1810), was a Finnish innkeeper, hotelier and banker.

Eva Falck moved to Turku from Stockholm. She was unmarried and listed as a member of the Burgher class. She operated an innkeeper business in Turku from 1794 onward. Innkeeper business was not included in the guild professions and so was easily accessible for women.

However, Falck's business was not an ordinary innkeeper business, she operated the perhaps most luxurious and elite of its kind in Finland. She rented out rooms for receptions and festivities of different kinds, had several restaurants around town and catered to the richest clientele. In 1802, it was her hotel which hosted the king and queen during their stay on their way to their meeting with the Russian Tsar by the Russian border.

She was perhaps the first business owner in Finland known to use advertising in her business, which was at that time an innovation. She was successful enough to use her capital for banking business.
