= Prevention of Terror Ordinance =

The Prevention of Terror Ordinance (Hebrew: פקודה למניעת טרור) is the statute used by the prosecution in most trials in Israel against suspects arrested by the Shabak, Israeli Police, Magav/Border Guard, or the Israel Defense Forces for security offenses. The PTO has been used in both military and civil courts, though they are applied in different ways. Generally, Arab residents of the West Bank or Gaza, being as they are subject to the Military Administration, are tried in military courts due to the lack of citizenship of a sovereign state. (The Palestinian National Authority [PNA] has only an administrative function, as the responsibility of Palestinian representation in the international community is still controlled by the Palestine Liberation Organization [PLO]). The PTO is also used very rarely in the case of Israeli residents who committed terror attacks, such as members of the 1980s Jewish Underground, as well as Arab Israelis who collaborate with Palestinian terror groups.

== The Ordinance ==
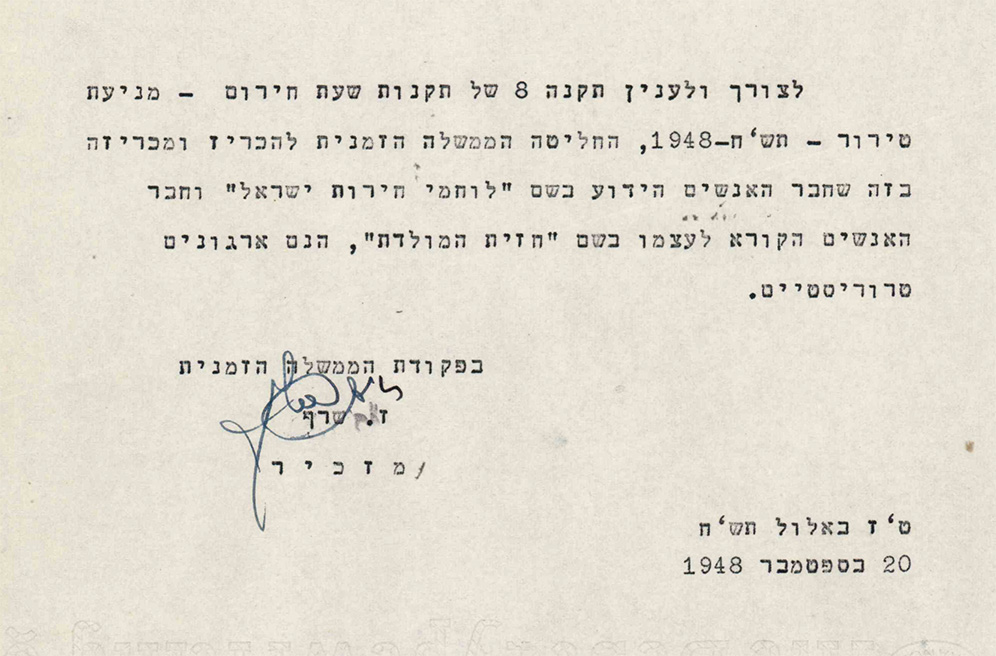
Declaration of Lehi as a terrorist organization, September 20, 1948

The Ordinance was promulgated in September 1948 in the wake of the assassination by the Jewish underground group Lehi of the United Nations mediator Folke Bernadotte. It was used to forcibly disband not only Lehi but also the larger group the Irgun.

== Famous Defendants ==
Early Years

Since the prosecution of fedayoun leaders in the 1950s, many landmarks have been made in the use of this controversial statute. Kozo Okamoto, a member of the Japanese Red Army who committed the 1971 Lod Airport machine gun attack on behalf of the Popular Front for the Liberation of Palestine, was given a life sentence and was released in 1997, long after the JRA itself had faded from the spotlight in Japan.

Convictions under the law increased exponentially throughout the 1970s, though most of the defendants were low-ranking PLO insurgents caught by patrols.

Domestic and Foreign Terror

The Gush Emunim Underground became the first Israeli organization to be charged with offences under the act. In the mid-1980s they were convicted for a series of car bombing attempts against Arab mayors in the West Bank, all of whom survived but were severely maimed. The Makhteret legal procedures coincided with the detention of many members of the Hizbullah organization, a Lebanese Islamist group that committed numerous attacks against IDF forces in southern Lebanon as well as civilians within Israel. Though it is unverified whether any Hizbullah members were convicted in civil courts, senior members of the group, including Mustafa Dirani and Sheikh Hassan Obeid, were convicted of security offenses in military courts due to the group's policy of kidnapping Israeli soldiers to ransom for captured comrades. Machteret legal teams used the Israeli policy of releasing senior Hizbullah officials and other terror convicts as justification for their own release, a process in the end succeeded, as by 1992 none of the group's suspects were still behind bars.

In the 1990s, as the Shabak began to warn against the proliferation of right-wing, messianic Jewish groups that rejected the authority of the Israeli government as heretical, the Attorney General's Office and Ministry of Justice considered using the law to prevent the growth of violent tendencies within Israel's Jewish population. In 1994, when Kach activist Baruch Goldstein committed the suicidal Hebron massacre, the Rabin government cracked down on the group's activities, as the Shabak increased its surveillance of activists, and leading figures such as Noam Federman, Baruch Marzel, and Itamar Ben-Gvir were put under house arrest. Though the legality of these measures has always been in question, the results have passed the test of time, as the effectiveness of Jewish terror groups in carrying out coordinated or group operations has been minimal, except for "lone wolf" attacks such as the 2005 Shfaram massacre.

== Modern Enforcement ==
The eruption of the First Intifada in 1987 created the first situation where many residents of the West Bank and Gaza were brought to trial under the law. This situation was even more controversial than the 1970s trials of PLO terror suspects, because there were even defendants convicted of offences such as stone throwing.

Since start of the Second Intifada in 2001, many famous defendants have found themselves on the dock in Israeli courts. By far the most famous of them, and maybe in the history of the law itself, is Tanzim and Al-Aqsa Martyrs' Brigades founder Marwan Barghouti was convicted in 2004 on five counts of murder and three of attempted murder, in addition to membership in a terror organization in a civil court. The difficulty of the trial of Barghouti, as with many senior terror suspects as opposed to their "foot soldiers", is in proving that they have knowledge or acquiescence to the offences connected to them. Barghouti was also accused of over twenty other murder charges that in the end were dropped for lack of proof. Barghouti's trial, though deemed fair, has sparked an international campaign to free him, as the Palestinian National Authority challenges Israeli jurisdiction over him. The trial of Ahmad Saadat, chairman of the Popular Front for the Liberation of Palestine, will probably follow a similar course, though as opposed to Barghouti's his is expected to take place in a civil court.

Israeli Arabs have also been charged under the act numerous times since 2001, including the murderers of Israeli Minister of Tourism Rehavam Ze'evi "Gandhi", as well as those who have been caught and charged for conspiracy to assassinate former Sephardi Chief Rabbi Ovadia Yoseph in April 2005, most of whom in both cases are residents of East Jerusalem and therefore hold Israeli citizenship.

== Activities Included ==
In many trials throughout the history of the prosecution of the law, much of the case of the prosecution was based on suspects' membership in the organization and not necessarily on violent or other criminal offences. For example, Fouad Shoubaki (arrested in March 2006), a businessman who funded the Al-Aqsa Martyrs' Brigades and helped organize the Karine A weapons shipment will probably be tried for his financial support for terror activities.

Israeli Knesset Member Azmi Bishara, the leader of the National Democratic Assembly, was charged in 2001 under the act as well as the Emergency Regulations (Foreign Travel) act for his visits to Syria, a state that is defined as being at war with Israel. He also made two speeches that same year justifying Palestinian terror attacks against Israel. In February 2006 Bishara was cleared of all charges. In an even more bizarre case, in 2004 peace activist Tali Fahima was charged with assistance to a terror organization for her role in complicating IDF operations aimed toward locating and arresting Al-Aqsa Martyrs' Brigades Jenin leader Zakaria Zubeidi. Though it couldn't be proven that Fahima had knowledge of attacks that Palestinian terror groups had planned, the fact that she served as a human shield for Zubeidi and his staff resulted in her conviction.

As of June 28, 2006 the IDF has arrested over ten members of the Palestine Legislative Council who are members of the Hamas or are wanted for security offenses as part of Operation Summer Rains, and will be charged as members of a terror organization. Previously there fourteen members of the PLC serving time in Israel jails for security offenses. Among those who are most eligible for prosecution are Foreign Minister Mahmoud al-Zahar, a long-time member of the Hamas's military wing, the Izz ad-Din al-Qassam Brigades, as well as four members of the assembly representing Hamas in East Jerusalem, including Mohammed Abu-Tir, who have lately had their residency revoked. Unlike the cases listed above, most of those arrested will have a difficult time avoiding conviction in an Israeli court, as many of them planned or assisted in terror attacks when they were members of Izzedine al-Qassam.

== Bibliography ==
- Original text: Official Gazette, No. 24 of the 25th Elul 5708, pp. 73–77 (Hebrew).
- Authorised English translation: Laws of the State of Israel, Vol. II, pp. 76–81.
- Present text as amended: Wikisource (Hebrew).
