= Christine Falk =

German immunologist

- Citizenship: Germany
- Known for: Transplantation immunology
- Scientific career
- Fields: Immunology

Christine Falk (born 5 November 1966 in Munich) is a German immunologist. She was a member of the German Federal Government's COVID-19 Expert Council (Corona-ExpertInnenrat). In the 2023 election of the German Research Foundation (DFG) review boards (Fachkollegien), Falk was elected to the review board for immunology (Fach: 2.21-05 Immunologie).

== Career ==
Falk leads the Institute for Transplantation Immunology at Hannover Medical School (MHH).

In the 2023 DFG review board election results, she is listed among the elected members for immunology, affiliated with Hannover Medical School.

== Scientific work ==
Falk has contributed to peer-reviewed research in transplantation immunology. She is a co-author of studies examining immune responses associated with ischemia–reperfusion injury in heart transplantation, identifying inflammatory markers relevant to graft outcomes.

Her scientific expertise lies in clinical immunology and translational medicine, with a focus on immune regulation in transplantation and immunocompromised patients, as reflected in her research publications and public scientific commentary.

== Public engagement ==
Falk has taken part in public discussions on immunology and infectious disease in German public broadcasting. In a Deutschlandfunk interview related to the 2025 Nobel Prize in Physiology or Medicine, she discussed immune tolerance and its relevance to autoimmune disease, cancer, and transplantation medicine.

During the COVID-19 pandemic, Falk commented on immune protection and vaccination strategies, including booster immunisation and protection of high-risk groups, in national radio programmes.

She has also discussed public health measures and vaccination strategies in interviews with German health policy publications.
