= Catholic Social Academy of Austria =

Coordinates: 48°13′3.05″N 16°22′10.47″E

- Established: 1958; 68 years ago
- Purpose: Adult education, research advocacy, publication
- Location: Vienna, Austria
- First head: Walter Riener
- General Secretary: Magdalena Holztrattner
- Main organ: ksoe Dossiers
- Affiliations: Catholic Church
- Budget: 1 million euros
- Website: CSAA

Catholic Social Academy of Austria (Katholische Sozialakademie Österreichs) was established by the Austrian Catholic Bishops' Conference in 1958 with its seat in Vienna, Austria. Its mission is to "research, mediate, and convey the use of Catholic social teaching in practice" and it does this mainly through social analysis, political adult education, and organizational development.

== History ==
=== Mariazell Manifesto ===
In May 1952, a student day was held in the Austrian place of pilgrimage Mariazell to prepare for Catholic Day 1952, under the slogan A free church in a free society. In doing so, the principle was established of independence of the Catholic Church from partisan politics in Austria. The student day also called for a Catholic social program and training centre. The paper was later named the Mariazeller Manifesto.

In 1954 a Social and Economic Policy Unit was created in the Archdiocese of Vienna. As a result, the Austrian Bishops' Conference decided in the spring conference of March 1958 to establish the Catholic Social Academy. The archbishop in Vienna Franz Kardinalkönig drew up a statute and made it a church entity. On 1 October 1958, Jesuit Fr. Walter Riener was placed in charge of the Social Academy, as half-day lecturer and full-time secretary. In 1959 the premises were located in the Schottengasse. With this founding of the Catholic Social Academy of Austria, the training institution called for by the Mariazeller Manifesto was implemented as a part of the social program of the Austrian Catholics.

=== Social justice education ===
The creation of the social and economic policy unit of the Archdiocese of Vienna came earlier in 1954, with the mission of "research and dissemination of the Catholic social doctrine as well as promoting its application." A differentiated program developed on the pillars of social policy, political adult education, and organizational development.

From a three-month internship course for men, and later also for women, a course in "Social Responsibility" was developed, which confers the title "Academic Practitioners of Social Responsibility." In addition to the two- and three-week social seminars for women, the Women's Academy was founded in the early 2000s. The two-year vocational course was awarded the "Innovation Award for Adult Education" and became the inspiration for a women's platform in 2007.

In the mid-1970s, the Catholic Social Academy initiated talks between the Church and political parties as well as the Chamber of Labor and the trade unions, and intensified cooperation with their political academies. The political education work of the Social Academy led to projects in inner- and extra-church enterprises and focused on the humanization of the working world.

The academy's political education for adults assists in the development of persons and organizations, in innovation and finding alternatives, and in accompanying change. Organizational development happens through the introduction of ideas and skills, through participation in initiatives, and through the assumption of responsibility.

=== Issues ===
Guaranteed minimum income became a central theme of social policy in the mid-1980s, through the publications of the academy.

Starting with a study day entitled From quantity to quality of life, a book of the same name arose, and from it the fictional series Social Foci. At the end of the 1980s, the academy played a decisive role in preparing the first Austrian poverty conference, which was held in Salzburg at the end of 1995. The creeping erosion of Sunday was countered by the Sunday Alliance, which was broadly based and included churches, trade unions, and economic and civil society organizations. The academy won a prize for its International Fotoworkshop "In the focus: Sunday work."

Since the 2000s, the migration of families and their integration into society has been the subject of several studies and advocacy. Also during this time, the academy coordinated the creation of an ecumenical social document in which fourteen Christian churches participated. Social Word (Sozialwort) of the World Council of Churches in Austria is a compass for social thinking and action. From 2004, the ethics of financial investment was discussed.

In 2008, a fund was set up to subsidize resources for new programs that the current budget does not cover.

== Organization ==
The Board of Trustees of the Social Academy, in addition to the Unit Bureau, includes representatives from all the dioceses of the Austrian Bishops' Conferences, the Social Science Institutes at the Austrian Universities, Catholic Action of Austria, the social partners, and the management of the academy. In addition, a program committee is provided for in the Articles of Incorporation. The academy is an active member of the Forum of Catholic Adult Education in Austria.

== General secretaries ==
- Walter Riener (1908 – 9 September 1972), from 1958 to 1972
- Herwig Büchele (b. 1935), from 1972 to 1983
- Alois Riedlsperger (b. 1945), from 1983 to 2005, and from 2009 to 2013
- Markus Schlagnitweit (b. 1962), from 2005 to 2009
- Magdalena Holztrattner (b. 1975), since 2013

== Publications ==
- Ksoe-news contains news and statements from the Catholic Social Academy of Austria. Two Dossiers are published each year and seven books have been published.
- Annual reports provide an overview of the focus, projects, and ongoing courses (seminars, student days, workshops).
- Walter Riener. Social manual. Catholic social doctrine and the contemporary situation. Hollinek: Vienna, 1956.
- Walter Riener. Current problems of trade union policy. Lectures and results of the 2nd Trade Union Conference of the Institute for Social Policy and Social Reform. Eds. Walter Riener et al. Dr. Karl-Kummer Institute for Social Policy and Social Reform, 1958 # 9, Vienna: Ueberreuter.
- Walter Riener. The Christian Concept of Humanity. Christian Social Work Letters, Christian Community Workers' Association – Munich Group (ed.). Munich, 1958. pp. 369–1382.
