= Niels Nikolaus Falck =

Danish jurist and historian

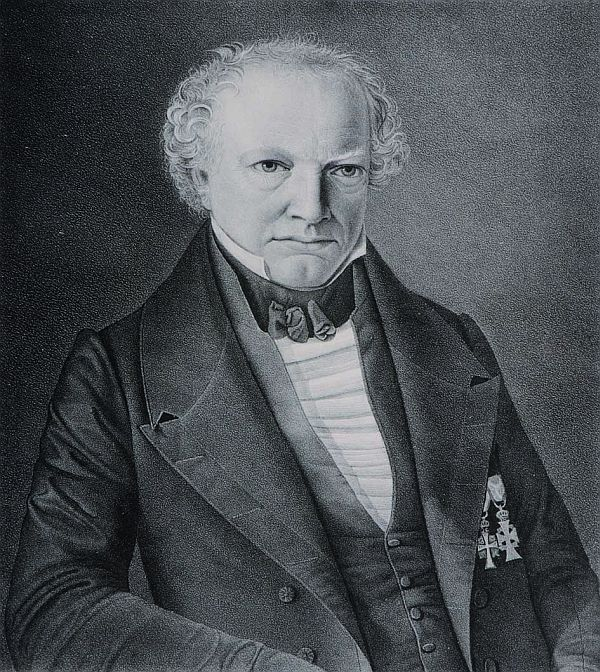
Niels Nikolaus Falck

Niels Nikolaus Falck (25 November 1784 – 11 May 1850) was a Danish jurist and historian.

== Biography ==
He was born at Emmerlef in the Duchy of Schleswig. He was educated at the University of Kiel and became a theological candidate in 1808, graduating dr. phil. in 1809. From 1813 he was appointed professor juris in Kiel. In 1814, he became professor of law at the University of Kiel, and in 1838 he was appointed president of the Schleswig-Holstein Assembly of the States.

He published a Juristische Encyklopädie (“Encyclopedia of jurisprudence,” 5th ed. 1851), and was a prolific author in the history and jurisprudence of Schleswig-Holstein. His other works include: Handbuch des schleswig-holsteinischen Privatrechts (“Handbook of civil law in Schleswig-Holstein,” 1825-48); and Sammlungen zur nähern Kunde des Vaterlandes (“Anthology for a better understanding of the fatherland,” 1819-25). He also edited the Staatsbürgerliches Magazin (10 vols., 1821–31; continued as Neues Staatsbürgerliches Magazin, 10 vols., 1833–41).

Falck became Commander of the Order of the Dannebrog in 1840. He died at Kiel in 1850 and was buried at Parkfriedhof Eichhof in Kronshagen.
