= Henry Faulk =

Head of program to "re-educate" German Prisoners of War held in England in World War II

- Born: 22 December 1907
- Died: 4 October 2001 (aged 93)
- Education: University of Glasgow (Modern Languages)

Henry Faulk OBE (22 December 1907 – 4 October 2001) was an Executive Field Officer responsible for a program that aimed to "re-educate" 400,000 German Prisoners of War held in England at the end of World War II.

== Life and career ==
Henry Faulk was born in Glasgow, Scotland, and grew up in Dunshalt (also spelt Dunshelt), Fife. He went to school in Dundee, then studied Modern Languages at the University of Glasgow.

Faulk joined the British Army at the outbreak of World War II, initially working as an interpreter with the Intelligence Corps. Towards the end of the war at the age of 37, Faulk was seconded to the Political Intelligence Department (later renamed the Prisoner of War Division; POWD) of the Foreign Office, and became an Executive Field Officer responsible for a program that aimed to "re-educate" 400,000 German Prisoners of War held in England.

Faulk wrote about his experiences in his 1977 book, Group Captives. A review described the book as follows:

Faulk discusses in a concise, objective and, at times, somewhat dry manner both German and British attitudes affecting re-education, the changing environment and the aims and methods of POWD. He offers a generally favorable evaluation of the results.

Some aspects of Faulk's account have been challenged. For example, Faulk "categorically denied" the use of German informants in Prisoner of War camps; however, a 2024 analysis argued that "it is clear from other archival documents and memoirs that they were used by British officials for political gradings and to acquire intelligence in the camps".

On leaving the army in 1948, Faulk worked as a teacher in Glasgow, first at Glasgow High School, then Woodside Secondary and Cranhill Secondary. Faulk had three children with his first wife Lena (Malcolm, Edith, and David), and one son (Andrew) with his second wife Jessie.

== Published works ==
- Henry Faulk (1970). Die deutschen Kriegsgefangenen in Großbritannien: Re-education. Bielefeld: Gieseking.
- Henry Faulk (1977). Group Captives: The Re-education of German Prisoners of War in Britain 1945-1948. London: Chatto & Windus.

== Recognition ==
Faulk was awarded an OBE in 1947.
