= Die Gruft =

Homeless institution

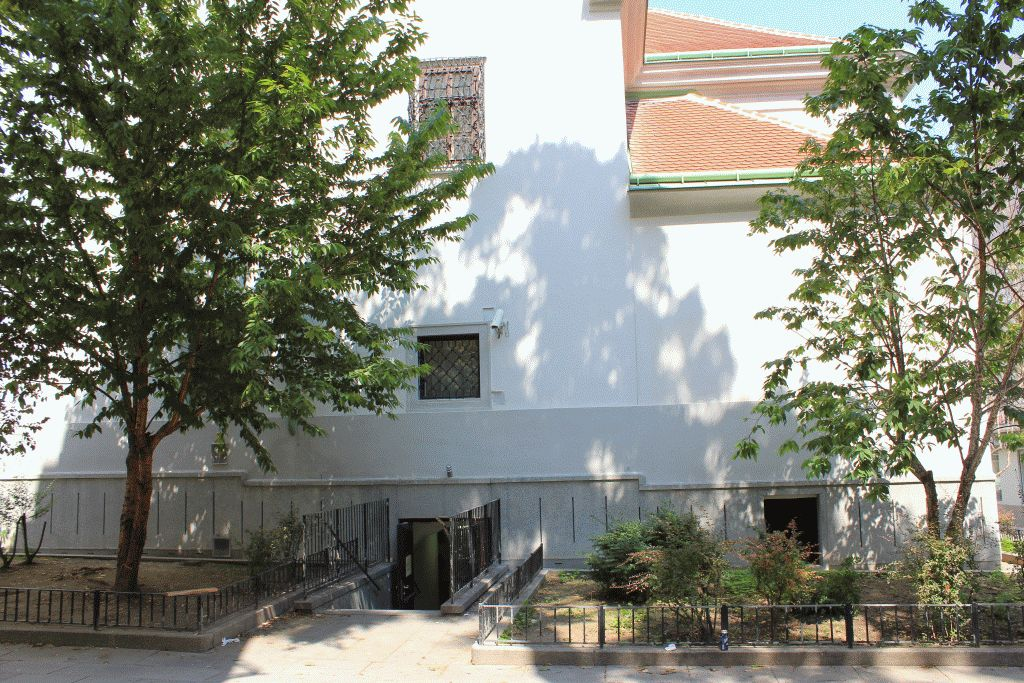
The entrance to the "crypt"

Die Gruft (German for 'The Crypt') is a charity run by the Caritas of the Roman Catholic Archdiocese of Vienna in the 6th district of Vienna Mariahilf on the premises below the Church of Mariahilf (often: Barnabite Church). It opened in 1986, and is currently open 24 hours a day offering meals, shower facilities, shelters, overnight accommodation, medical and psychiatric care to people experiencing homelessness.

== History ==
Die Gruft was founded in 1986 by Salvatorian pastor and theologian Albert Gabriel (then pastor at the Mariahilfer Church) with the support of students from the nearby Amerling School. It originally served as a warming room for the homeless during advent. It was particularly intended to help out poor people, elderly people and orphans. They offered tea and simple hot meals for two hours daily in the former plague cemetery below the Mariahilfer Church. Since October 1994, the crypt has been open 24 hours a day through the support of the Social Welfare Fund. In July 1996, Caritas Wien took over management of the institution.

== Statistics and funding ==
Free food is served three times daily, for a total of 81,897 food portions in 2007. In addition, there were 25,477 overnight stays in 2007 and 1,165 received care by social workers. Of those, about 15% were women.

Half of the funding is provided by the Social Welfare Fund – around €500,000 in 2008 – the other half by donations. In 2012, 97,285 meals were donated – more than ever before – and there were 19,453 overnight stays, slightly more than in 2011.

== Expansion and Zweite Gruft ==
In 2009, Caritas opened a Zweite Gruft (German: "second crypt") in Vienna's 18th district, Währing, specifically for EU foreigners.

Due to an increased demand for space at the site below the Mariahilfer Church, an expansion of the crypt began on 31 August 2012. On 19 September 2013, an above-ground building for daytime care of the homeless opened. This added 450 m^{2} of usable space in and around the vicarage of the Barnabite Church.
