= Enrique Álvarez Córdova =

Salvadoran politician and statesman (1930–1980)

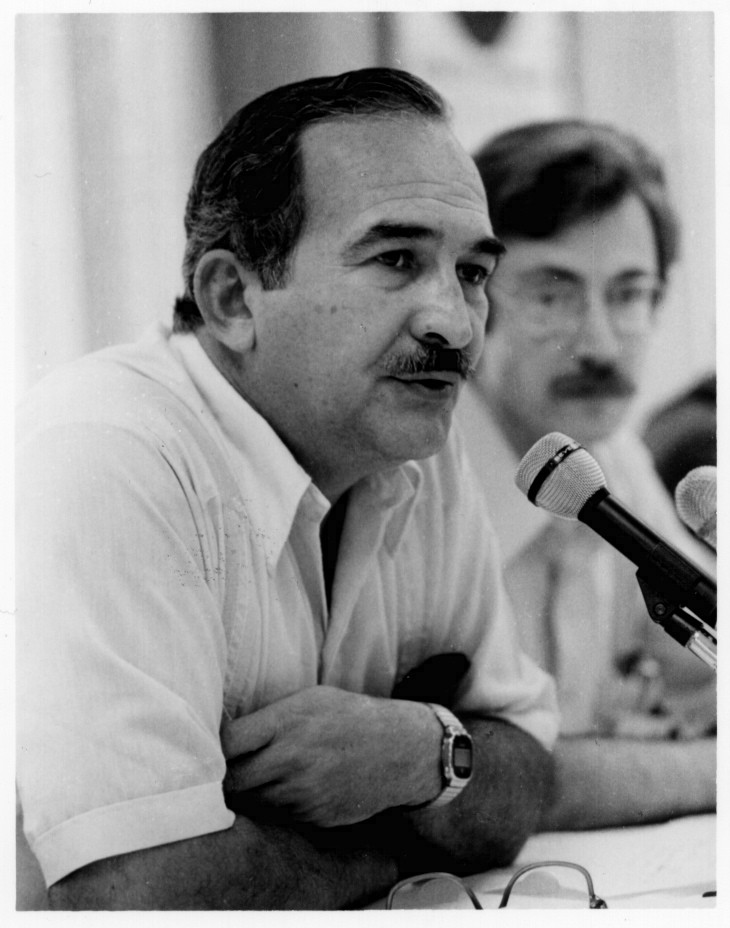

Enrique Álvarez Córdova (4 March 1930 – 27 November 1980) was a politician and statesman of El Salvador.

== Biography ==
Enrique was the son of one of El Salvador's ruling families. He was intelligent, charismatic and wealthy. His mother was surnamed Córdova.

Álvarez attended Rutgers University in New Brunswick, New Jersey. During his time there he was involved in Kappa Sigma (Gamma Upsilon).

After a frustrated attempt to be a Salvadoran "New Dealer," attempting to implement agrarian reform as El Salvador's minister of agriculture and cattle raising, Álvarez dramatically changed course and joined the Democratic Revolutionary Front (Frente Democrático Revolucionário or FDR).

== Kidnapping and death ==
On 27 November 1980, Álvarez and five other FDR directors were kidnapped from a meeting in El Salvador's capital, San Salvador. According to the 29 November 1980, issue of El Diario de Hoy cited by former Dartmouth researcher John W. Lamperti, their bodies were discovered outside the capital on 28 November. Enrique himself had "sustained twelve bullet wounds: ten in the back, one in the head and one in the arm, plus three other wounds in the back."

=== Aftermath ===
The right-wing extremist group Maximiliano Hernández Martínez Anti-Communist Brigade (Brígada Anticomunista Maximiliano Hernández Martínez) claimed responsibility for the kidnapping and subsequent murders. Given the volatile situation present at the time, the crime sparked public outcry, curtailing hopes for a political solution to the Salvadoran Civil War, which began that same year. Despite denying any involvement, in 1993 the post-Salvadoran Civil War United Nations Truth Commission reported a strong connection between high level government security forces and Enrique's murder, however it was unable to identify the perpetrators. Enrique was later described by San Salvador archdiocese member Monsignor Ricardo Urioste as "the first rich man who gave his life for the poor of El Salvador."

== Sources ==
- Daily Latin Co.
