= Falck (Danish company) =

Danish multinational corporation

Falck A/S
- Falck Logo
- Formerly: Falck Rescue Corps
- Type: Aktieselskab
- ISIN: DK0010305317
- Industry: Healthcare; Emergency Response
- Founded: 3 October 1906; 120 years ago in Copenhagen, Denmark
- Founder: Sophus Falck
- Headquarters: Falck Center Copenhagen, Sydhavnsgade 18, Copenhagen, 2450, Denmark
- Area served: Worldwide
- Key people: Jakob Riis (President & CEO); Tor Magne Lønnum (CFO)
- Services: Firefighting, EMS and Ambulance services, roadside assistance
- Owners: Lundbeck Foundation(57.36%); Kirkbi (27.73%); Tryg
- Website: Official Website

Falck A/S is a Danish multinational corporation with activities in most areas of Europe and representation on five continents. It has four business areas: healthcare, assistance, safety services and emergency assistance. The firm has 25,000 employees in 26 countries.

== History ==
The company was founded in 1906 by Sophus Falck after he witnessed and volunteered at a fire at the Christiansborg Palace in Copenhagen, Denmark, in 1884. The lack of organization made a big impression on him, and motivated the creation of Falck later on in 1906. His mission was to help others in emergency situations.

By 1956, the firm was a nationwide operator with 100 rescue stations in Denmark, and the company expanded seven years later by acquiring the shares of the Zonen rescue service, their main Danish road assistance competitor.

In 1988, The Falck family sold the firm to Baltica, a Danish-based insurer. The company purchased the security service division ISS Securitas from ISS in 1993, the first in a series of mergers, which later included both Group 4 Securicor and Wackenhut. In 1999 Nederlandse Veiligheidsdienst was purchased by Falck.

The company later merged its activities in the security field with Securicor Plc. That new company was named Group4Securicor. In connection with the merger, Falck was separated from Group 4 Falck and listed independently on the Copenhagen Stock Exchange. Danish media described the separation as "Falck returns to its roots". In February 2005 Falck was delisted from the Copenhagen Stock Exchange because Nordic Capital had bought the shares of Falck. Falck has now re-entered the security field. In 2011, Nordic Capital sold its shares, making the principal shareholders The Lundbeck Foundation and KIRKBI.

Falck funds its acquisitions and capital expenditures out of its own operating cash flows. The majority of the company is owned by two Danish nonprofit foundations: Lundbeck, a global pharmaceutical company, and the KIRKBI Group, a 75% holder of The Lego Group.

== Services ==
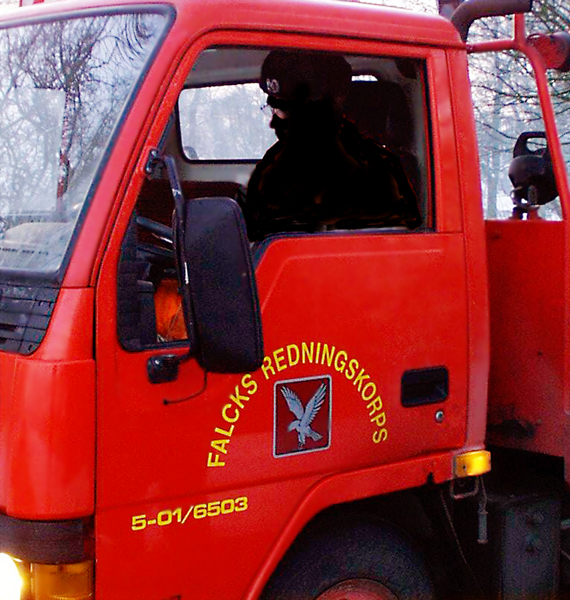
Falck rescue truck

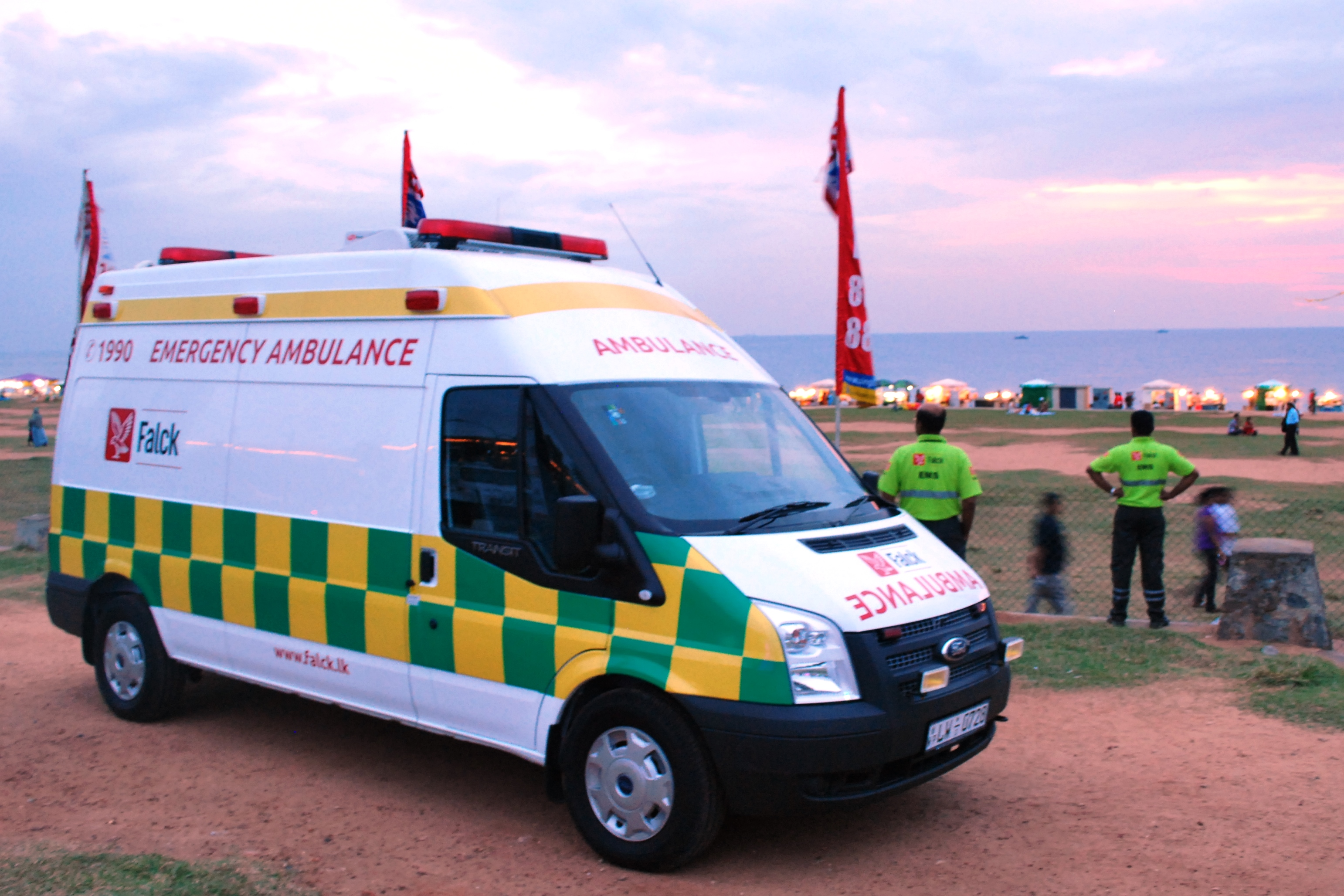
Falck Ambulance in Colombo Sri Lanka

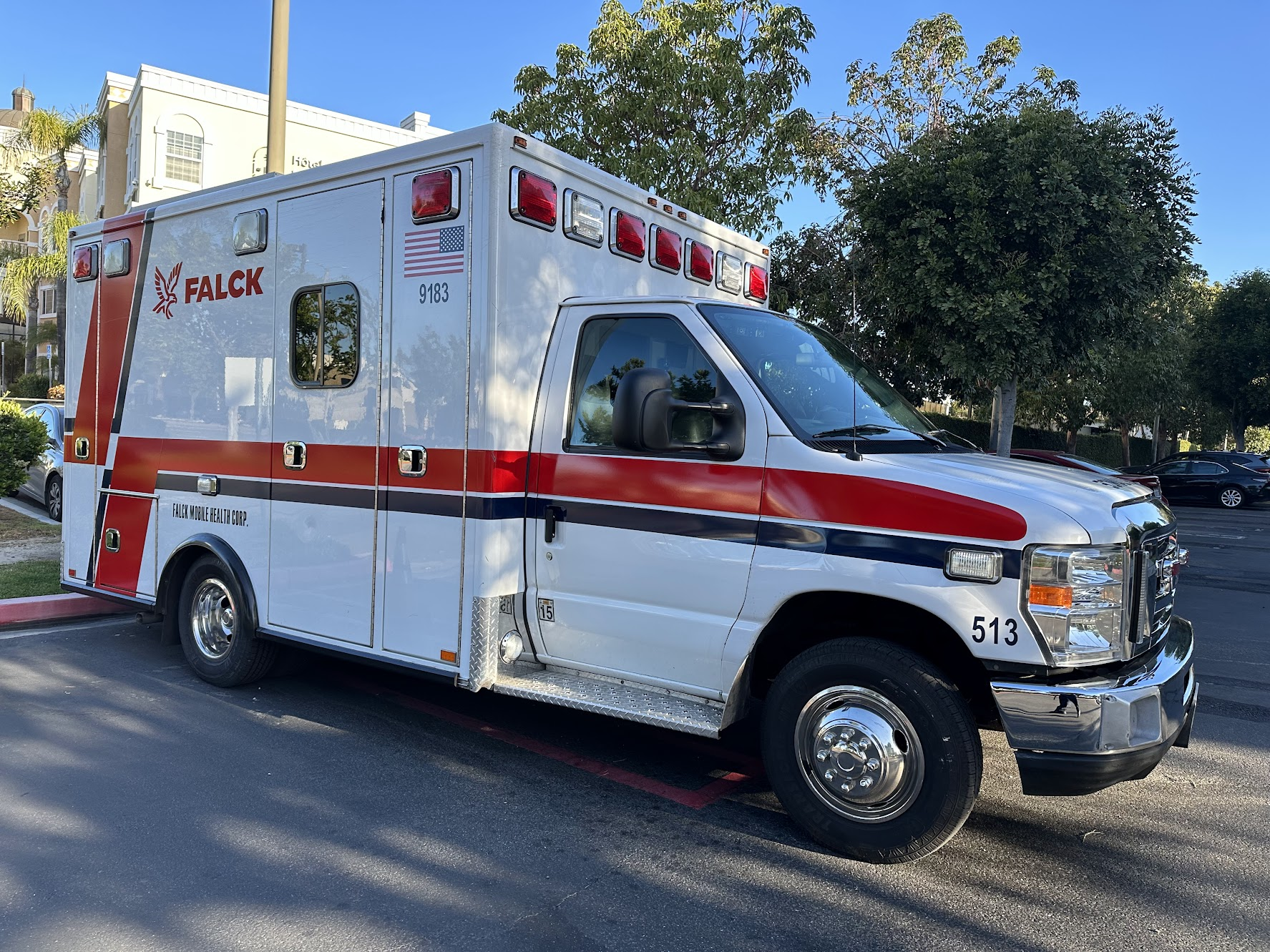
Typical Falck USA basic life support ambulance stationed in Orange County, CA

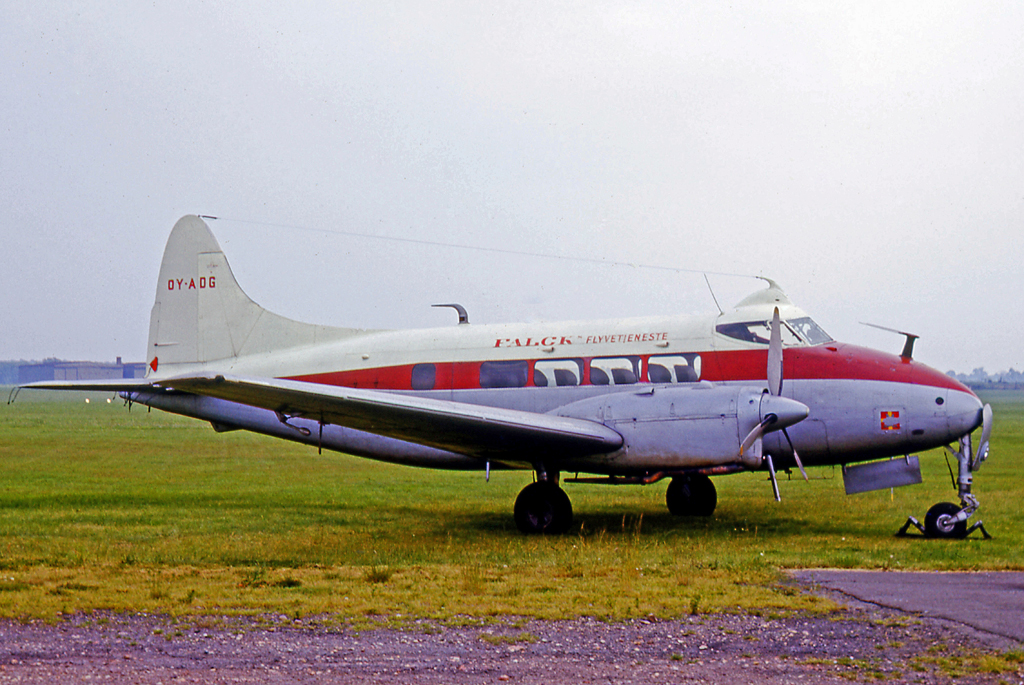
Falck De Havilland Dove light airliner wearing their titles and symbol in 1965

Falck A/S provides health, safety, roadside assistance and other services to corporate customers and private households in Denmark, Norway, Sweden, Poland and Estonia. Its international operation also includes activities in countries like Belgium, Brazil, Finland, Germany (States of Brandenburg, Hamburg, Lower Saxony, North Rhine-Westphalia and Saxony), Lithuania, Malaysia, the Netherlands, Poland, Slovakia, Spain, Russia, Sri Lanka, Trinidad and Tobago, the United Kingdom, the United States, Uruguay and Panamá.

In addition, Falck become one of the largest private ambulance companies in Europe, by operating over 3000 ambulances. The firm provides ambulance services to the general public in seven countries in close collaboration with the authorities. Falck also provides other services for the public sector such as patient transport, rehabilitation of patients from the public hospital sector, operation of assistive equipment centers and a number of services for the police and the road authorities. Based on data from 2009, Falck was in charge of 65 percent of municipality fire brigades and 85 percent of ambulance services In Denmark.

Falck Safety Services (formerly called Training) was a provider of rescue and safety courses, especially for staff in the offshore sector and the maritime sector, and also the chemical industry, fire services, the aviation industry and military defence units. In December 2017, the Board of Directors decided to initiate a process to sell the Falck Safety Services division. The Board's decision was intended to streamline the Group by focusing on key business units. Falck Safety Services and the Falck Fire Academy were acquired by Polaris in September 2018.

== Falck USA ==
Falck USA is a wholly owned subsidiary, that provides 24-hour ambulance transport and 9-1-1 response services. It provides basic life support and advanced life support services in the United States. The firm entered the US market in 2008 by acquiring Alford Safety Services Inc. At that time, Alford had six training centers in Louisiana and Texas. Now, Falck Alford is one of the largest providers of offshore and safety training to operators in the Gulf of Mexico.

In 2010, Falck began offering ambulance service in the US with the acquisitions of private ambulance operations LifeStar Response (sold to Keystone Quality Transportation in 2021), American Ambulance and Care Ambulance Service serving Los Angeles, Riverside and Orange counties in California. In 2015, Care was awarded a contract to serve 12 new Orange County cities following a controversial bidding process that the Orange County Register called "long and troubled". Having since acquired more US-based ambulance companies, the firm now operates more than 1000 ambulances and is one of the largest private providers of emergency medical services in the United States.

In 2019, the County of Alameda, California contracted Falck Northern California to provide 9-1-1 ambulance services in all areas of Alameda County, with the exception of Alameda, Albany, Berkeley, and Piedmont.

In 2021, the City of San Diego, California awarded Falck a contract for ambulance and paramedic services in the city, previously held by AMR.
