= Sophus Falck =

Danish businessman

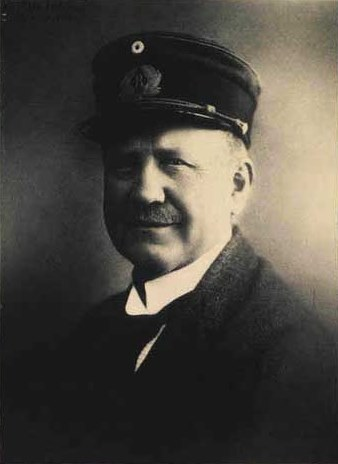
Sophus Falck, circa 1910

Sophus August Falck (15 November 1864 in Copenhagen – 29 July 1926 in Copenhagen) was a Danish pioneer in the area of firefighting and rescue services.

In 1906 he founded the company Falck Rescue Corps (Danish: Falcks Redningskorps). This later evolved into one of the world's biggest security and emergency services corporations.

Sophus Falck was quoted for saying: "Rapid assistance is double assistance”; this was the motto on which Falck had established his business. Falck's business would flourish due to his philosophy on the importance of service without consideration of compensation or reward; he was quoted: "To prevent or limit the consequences of accidents or destruction .... Respond when people or animals are in danger of life, and assist whether payment is possible or not". He named his company after his own surname.

== See also ==
- Company website
- Nudansk leksikon (entry "Falck") Politikens Forlag, 2002
