= Hannover Medical School =

University medical center in Hanover, Germany

- Medizinische Hochschule Hannover
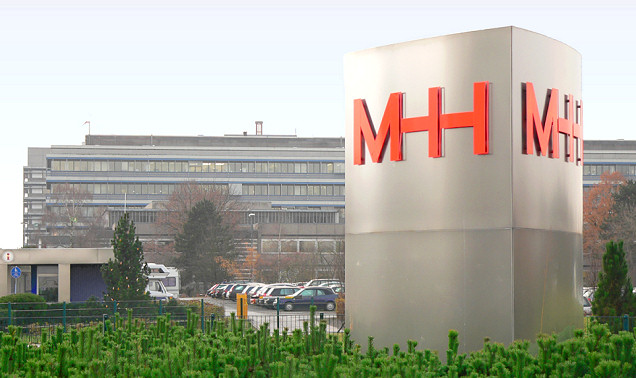
- Motto: In necessariis unitas, in dubiis libertas, in omnibus caritas
- Type: Public
- Established: 1965
- President: Denise Hilfiker-Kleiner
- Total staff: >11.000
- Students: 3,997
- Location: Hanover, Lower Saxony, Germany; 52.383659°N 9.804494°E
- Campus: Urban
- Website: www.mhh.de/en/

The Hannover Medical School (German: Medizinische Hochschule Hannover, abbreviated to MHH) was founded as Germany's first independent medical university. Located in Hanover, it is a maximum care hospital with a supra-regional catchment area, a university offering courses in medicine and dentistry as well as numerous other subjects. It is also a research institution focusing on infection and immunity, transplantation and regeneration, biomedical engineering and implants.

== History ==
The MHH was founded in 1965. In June 1961, the German Science and Humanities Council recommended that seven new academies of medicine be established in Germany so that the number of medicine students would increase by 7,000. Within the month, the Parliament of Lower Saxony approved plans to establish a state medical university.

A committee to found a medical academy of Hanover met for the first time in December 1961. By February 1962, it was decided that this academy would be located in the city of Hanover. On 1 April 1963, the government of Lower Saxony issued an order to establish the Medical Academy of Hanover, which would become MHH.

In 1965, after less than four years of planning, the structure of the medical school had been decided, and construction plans were complete. On 27 May 1965, a celebration marking the founding of MHH was held at the University of Veterinary Medicine Hannover. The founding rector of MHH was the internist, Rudolph Schoen of the University of Göttingen. He was succeeded by the first elected rector, Fritz Hartmann who played a decisive role in both the concept and physical form of MHH. MHH was realised as a university campus in Roderbruch The close proximity of the clinics and institutes guarantees intense integration of patient care, research and teaching.

The first classes were held in the summer semester of 1965, in the Oststadt-Heidehaus Hospital The student-teacher ratio was initially 12 teachers for 41 students, but within ten years the number of students rose to about 1,000, and after only 20 years, to 3,000. With the addition of new departments, the original number of 12 professors increased to about 140. Only 12 years after MHH was founded, 80 per cent of the planned departments and clinics had been realised.

Being both an academic and a clinical institution, the MHH motto is Einheit, Freiheit, Nächstenliebe ('unity, freedom, charity'), and in full unitas in necessariis, libertas in dubiis, caritas in omnibus ('unity in what is necessary, liberty in case of doubt, charity in all things').

== International ==
PhD students and scientists from all over the world are involved in a variety of research projects at MHH and partner institutes.

== Hospital ==
The Hannover Medical School Hospital is a hospital with a supra-regional catchment area. It has 34 clinics with 1,520 beds and 41 institutes. In 2024, 53,512 patients were treated as inpatients and 282,572 as outpatients. The university specialises in particularly ill patients.

The MHH is Germany's largest transplant centre. In 2024, 334 solid organ transplants and 176 bone marrow and stem cell transplants were performed at the MHH. In addition, 426 cochlear implants were performed.

The Hannover Medical School comprises the following departments: General, Visceral and Transplant Surgery; Anaesthesiology and Intensive Care Medicine; Ophthalmology; Dermatology, Allergology and Venereology; Obstetrics and Gynaecology; Gastroenterology, Hepatology, Infectious Diseases and Endocrinology; Ear, Nose and Throat Medicine; Haematology, Haemostaseology, Oncology and Stem Cell Transplantation; Cardiac, Thoracic, Transplant and Vascular Surgery; Cardiology and angiology; Orthodontics; Paediatric and adolescent surgery; Paediatrics, paediatric haematology and oncology; Paediatrics, paediatric cardiology and paediatric intensive care medicine; Paediatrics, paediatric renal, hepatic and metabolic diseases; Paediatrics, paediatric pulmonology, allergology and neonatology; Oral and Maxillofacial Surgery; Neurosurgery; Neurology with Clinical Neurophysiology; Renal and Hypertensive Diseases; Nuclear Medicine; Orthopaedics; Plastic, Aesthetic, Hand and Reconstructive Surgery; Pulmonology and Infectious Diseases; Psychiatry, Social Psychiatry and Psychotherapy; Psychosomatics and Psychotherapy; Rehabilitation and Sports Medicine; Reconstructive Facial Surgery; Rheumatology and Immunology; Radiotherapy and Specialised Oncology; Trauma Surgery; Urology and Urological Oncology; Dental Prosthetics and Biomedical Materials Science; Conservative Dentistry, Periodontology and Preventive Dentistry.

The Centre for Rare Diseases at the MHH is dedicated to improving medical care for people with rare diseases.

The Claudia von Schilling Centre (Comprehensive Cancer Centre, CCC) provides multidisciplinary, holistic treatment for cancer at the MHH. Together with Göttingen University Hospital, it forms the Comprehensive Cancer Centre of Lower Saxony (CCC-N).

== Teaching ==
The MHH was founded as a reform university. From the outset, it has been based on the concept of cooperation between teachers and students "in small groups at the bedside". Since 2003, medical studies at the MHH have been taught using the HannibaL (Hanover integrated, career-oriented and adaptive curriculum) study model.

The range of courses on offer includes human medicine and dentistry, research-oriented master's and doctoral programmes in biological and health sciences, and academic health professions. In 2024, a total of 3,997 students, including 2,730 women (68.3%), from 80 nations (including stateless persons) were enrolled at the MHH. 549 students (13.7%) held a foreign passport. Most of them studied human medicine (2,488), followed by dentistry (4,523).

Degree programmes: Human Medicine, Dentistry, Clinical Psychology and Psychotherapy, Biomedicine, Biochemistry, Biology, Biomedical Data Science, Infectious Diseases and One Health, Public Health, PhD postgraduate programme in Molecular Medicine, Epidemiology, Infection Biology, Regenerative Sciences, BIOMedical Data Science, Function and Pathophysiology of the Auditory System, Midwifery.

Several structured doctoral programmes and MSC programmes are coordinated under the umbrella of the Hannover Biomedical Research School.

Degree programmes:

- Medicine (State Examination)
- Dentistry (State Examination)
- Clinical Psychology and Psychotherapy (Master's with State Examination)
- Biomedicine (Master's)
- Biochemistry (Bachelor's and Master's)
- Biology (Bachelor's)
- Biomedical Data Science (Master's)
- Infectious Diseases and One Health (Master's)
- Public Health (Master's)
- PhD programme in 'Molecular Medicine'
- PhD programme in 'Epidemiology'
- PhD programme in 'Infection Biology'
- PhD programme in "Regenerative Sciences"
- PhD programme in "Biomedical Data Science"
- PhD programme in "Function and Pathophysiology of the Auditory System"
- Midwifery (Bachelor's)

There are 21 different apprenticeship programmes at Hannover Medical School. Every year, 600 new apprentices join the scheme. These include the Federal Voluntary Service (BFD), the Voluntary Social Year (FSJ) and the Voluntary Year in Science (Freiwilliges Jahr in der Wissenschaft; FWJ).

== Research ==
The main areas of research at Hannover Medical School are infection and immunity, transplantation and regeneration, biomedical engineering and implants.

In 2024, MHH spent around €111.9 million in third-party funding. These funds came from sources including the German Research Foundation (DFG) and the Federal Ministry of Research, Technology and Space (BMFTR).

MHH heads the RESIST Cluster of Excellence – Defensive Weaknesses Against Infections and Their Control, and is involved in the Hearing4allconnects Cluster of Excellence: Innovative Technologies for Hearing Health – From the Ear to the Brain to Society, which is based at the University of Oldenburg. From 2006 to 2019, MHH led the REBIRTH Cluster of Excellence, which continues to exist as a virtual research centre for translational regenerative medicine.

Researchers at MHH are currently leading the Collaborative Research Centre/Transregio 298 "Safety-Integrated and Infection-Responsive Implants" (SIIRI), the Graduate College 2978 "Understanding and Utilising Therapy-Induced Adaptation Processes in Gastrointestinal Tumour Diseases" and the Graduate College 3135 "Activation of Cellular Anti-Microbial Effectors", Research Group 2591: 'Severity assessment in animal-based research' and Research Group 2953 'Sialic acid as a regulator in development and immunity'. The MHH is also involved in several other Collaborative Research Centres, Transregios, Research Training Groups and Research Groups of the DFG.

MHH is part of the German Centre for Infection Research (DZIF) and the German Centre for Lung Research (DZL). It has a partnership with the Helmholtz Centre for Infection Research (HZI) in Braunschweig. The two joint facilities run by MHH and HZI are the TWINCORE Centre for Experimental and Clinical Infection Research and the Centre for Individualised Infection Medicine (CiiM). MHH is a co-founder of the Lower Saxony Centre for Biomedical Engineering, Implant Research and Development (NIFE) and a partner of the Centre for Structural Systems Biology (CSSB) in Hamburg. MHH is part of the University Medicine Network (NUM), works closely with Fraunhofer ITEM, is a member of the HIGHmed consortium, a partner of the Institute for Biomedical Translation (IBT), and a partner of R2N.

MHH researchers are represented with numerous projects at the European Research Council (ERC) under the current EU Framework Programme for Research and Innovation, 'Horizon Europe'.

== Notable alumni ==
- Ursula von der Leyen, president of the European Commission

== Notable faculty ==
- Christine Falk, immunologist, leader of Hannover's Institute for Transplantation Immunology

== See also ==
- University of Hanover
