= Vaux =

Vaux may refer to:

== People ==
- Antoine-Alexis Cadet de Vaux (1743–1828), French chemist and pharmacist
- Bernard Carra de Vaux (1867–1953), French orientalist who published accounts of his travels in the Middle East
- Clotilde de Vaux (1815–1846), French writer and poet
- Louis-François Bertin de Vaux (1771–1842), French journalist
- Noël Jourda de Vaux (1705–1788), comte de Vaux, seigneur d'Artiac
- Roland de Vaux (1903–1971), French Dominican priest and archeologist
- Peter of Vaux de Cernay (floruit c.1215), Cistercian monk of Vaux de Cernay Abbey, in what is now Yvelines, northern France
- James Hardy Vaux (born 1782, date of death unknown), English-born convict transported to Australia on three separate occasions
- Bert Vaux (born 1968), American teacher of phonology and morphology at the University of Cambridge
- Calvert Vaux (1824–1895), British-born American architect and landscape designer
- Cydra Vaux (1962–2013), American sculptor
- David Vaux, award-winning scientist at WEHI, Melbourne, Australia
- Ernest Vaux (1865–1925), British Army officer
- John Vaux, Deputy Governor of Bombay in 1689
- Laurence Vaux (Vose) (1519–1585), an English canon regular and a Catholic martyr
- Marc Vaux (born 1932), British artist who rose to prominence in the 1960s
- Mary Vaux Walcott (1860–1940). American artist and naturalist known for her watercolor paintings of wildflowers
- Meta Vaux Warrick Fuller (1877–1968), African-American artist, notable as the first to make art celebrating Afrocentric themes
- Nick Vaux, retired Royal Marine officer, and former commander of 42 Commando during the Falklands War
- Richard Vaux (1816–1895), American politician, mayor of Philadelphia, and a member of the U.S. House of Representatives for Pennsylvania
- Roberts Vaux (1786–1836), lawyer, jurist, abolitionist, and philanthropist from Philadelphia
- William Sandys Wright Vaux (1818–1885), British antiquary of the 19th century
- William Sansom Vaux (1811-1882), American mineralogist from Philadelphia
- Baron Brougham and Vaux, a title in the Peerage of the UK
  - Henry Brougham, 1st Baron Brougham and Vaux (1778–1868), British statesman
  - William Brougham, 2nd Baron Brougham and Vaux (1795-1886), also known as William Brougham, British barrister and Whig politician
  - Henry Brougham, 3rd Baron Brougham and Vaux (1836-1927), British aristocrat and civil servant
  - Victor Brougham, 4th Baron Brougham and Vaux (1909–1967), British peer and politician
  - Michael Brougham, 5th Baron Brougham and Vaux (born 1938), British peer and a member of the House of Lords
- Baron Vaux of Harrowden, a title in the Peerage of England
  - Nicholas Vaux, 1st Baron Vaux of Harrowden (c. 1460–1523), soldier and courtier in England and an early member of the House of Lords
  - Thomas Vaux, 2nd Baron Vaux of Harrowden (1509–1556), English poet, the eldest son of Nicholas Vaux, 1st Baron Vaux of Harrowden
  - William Vaux, 3rd Baron Vaux of Harrowden (c. 1535–1595), English peer
    - Anne Vaux (c. 1562 – in or after 1637), a wealthy Catholic recusant, the third daughter of William Vaux, 3rd Baron Vaux of Harrowden
    - Henry Vaux, English recusant, priest smuggler, and poet during the reign of Elizabeth I, eldest child of William Vaux, 3rd Baron Vaux of Harrowden
  - Edward Vaux, 4th Baron Vaux of Harrowden (1588–1661), English peer, son of George Vaux

== Groups and companies ==
- Vaux (band), American alternative rock band
- Vaux Breweries, a major brewer based in Sunderland, UK

== Places ==
=== Places in Belgium ===
- Vaux (Bastogne), a village in the commune of Bastogne, Belgian Luxembourg
- Vaux (Gouvy), a hamlet in the commune of Gouvy, Belgian Luxembourg
- Vaux-et-Borset, a section of the Belgian municipality of Villers-le-Bouillet in the Walloon region in the province of Liège
- Vaux-sur-Sûre (Walloon: Li Vå-so-Seure), a Walloon municipality of Belgium in the province of Luxembourg
  - List of protected heritage sites in Vaux-sur-Sûre, the protected heritage sites in the Walloon town Vaux-sur-Sûre
  - Vaux-lez-Rosières, a section of the municipality of Vaux-sur-Sûre

=== Communes in France (Ardennes department) ===
- Vaux-Champagne, in the Ardennes department in northern France
- Vaux-en-Dieulet, in the Ardennes department in northern France
- Vaux-lès-Mouron, in the Ardennes department in northern France
- Vaux-lès-Mouzon, in the Ardennes department in northern France
- Vaux-lès-Rubigny, in the Ardennes department in northern France
- Vaux-Montreuil, in the Ardennes department in northern France
- Vaux-Villaine, in the Ardennes department in northern France

=== Other communes in France ===
- Béthancourt-en-Vaux, in the department of Aisne in Picardy in northern France
- Burey-en-Vaux, in the Meuse department in Lorraine in northeastern France
- Éclusier-Vaux, in the Somme department in Picardie in northern France
- Le Frestoy-Vaux, in the Oise department in northern France
- Hermival-les-Vaux, in the Calvados department in the Basse-Normandie region in northwestern France
- Jours-en-Vaux, in the Côte-d'Or department in eastern France
- Mercin-et-Vaux, in the Aisne department in Picardy in northern France
- Neurey-en-Vaux, in the Haute-Saône department in the region of Franche-Comté in eastern France
- Parigny-les-Vaux, in the Nièvre department in central France
- Pont-de-Vaux, in the Ain department in eastern France
- Rambluzin-et-Benoite-Vaux, in the Meuse department in Lorraine in north-eastern France
- Saint-Denis-de-Vaux, in the Saône-et-Loire department in the region of Bourgogne in eastern France
- Saint-Gérand-de-Vaux, in the Allier department in Auvergne in central France
- Saint-Germain-des-Vaux, in the Manche department in Normandy in north-western France
- Saint-Jean-de-Vaux, in the Saône-et-Loire department in the region of Bourgogne in eastern France
- Saint-Laurent-de-Vaux, in the Rhône department in eastern France
- Saint-Mard-de-Vaux, in the Saône-et-Loire department in the region of Bourgogne in eastern France
- Saint-Pierre-en-Vaux, in the Côte-d'Or department in eastern France
- Sainte-Marie-de-Vaux (Senta Marí de Vaus), in the Haute-Vienne department in the Limousin region in west-central France
- Sury-en-Vaux, in the Cher department in the Centre region of France
- Vaux, Allier (Vaus), in the Allier department in Auvergne in central France
- Vaux, Haute-Garonne, in the Haute-Garonne department in southwestern France
- Vaux, Moselle, in the Moselle department in Lorraine in north-eastern France
- Vaux, Vienne (or Vaux-en-Couhé), in the Vienne department in the Poitou-Charentes region in western France
- Vaux-Andigny, in the Aisne department in Picardy in northern France
- Vaux-devant-Damloup, in the Meuse department in Lorraine in north-eastern France
- Vaux-en-Amiénois, in the Somme department in Picardie in northern France
- Vaux-en-Beaujolais, in the Rhône department in eastern France
- Vaux-en-Bugey, in the Ain department in eastern France
- Vaux-en-Pré, in the Saône-et-Loire department in the region of Bourgogne in eastern France
- Vaux-en-Vermandois, in the Aisne department in Picardy in northern France
- Vaux-et-Chantegrue, in the Doubs department in the Franche-Comté region in eastern France
- Vaux-Lavalette, in the Charente department in southwestern France
- Vaux-le-Moncelot, in the Haute-Saône department in the region of Franche-Comté in eastern France
- Vaux-le-Pénil, in the Seine-et-Marne department in the Île-de-France region in north-central France
- Vaux-lès-Palameix, in the Meuse department in Lorraine in north-eastern France
- Vaux-les-Prés, in the Doubs department in the Franche-Comté region in eastern France
- Vaux-lès-Saint-Claude, in the Jura department in the Franche-Comté region in eastern France
- Vaux-Marquenneville, in the Somme department in Picardie in northern France
- Vaux-Rouillac, in the Charente department in southwestern France
- Vaux-Saules, in the Côte-d'Or department in eastern France
- Vaux-sous-Aubigny, in the Haute-Marne department in north-eastern France
- Vaux-sur-Aure, in the Calvados department in the Basse-Normandie region in northwestern France
- Vaux-sur-Blaise, in the Haute-Marne department in north-eastern France
- Vaux-sur-Eure, in the Eure department in Haute-Normandie in northern France
- Vaux-sur-Lunain, in the Seine-et-Marne department in the Île-de-France region in north-central France
- Vaux-sur-Mer, in the Charente-Maritime department in southwestern France
- Vaux-sur-Poligny, in the Jura department in the Franche-Comté region in eastern France
- Vaux-sur-Saint-Urbain, in the Haute-Marne department in north-eastern France
- Vaux-sur-Seine, in the Yvelines department in the Île-de-France in north-central France
- Vaux-sur-Seulles, in the Calvados department in the Basse-Normandie region in northwestern France
- Vaux-sur-Somme, in the Somme department in Picardie in northern France
- Vaux-sur-Vienne, in the Vienne department in the Poitou-Charentes region in western France

=== Other places ===
- Canal de Pont-de-Vaux, a canal in eastern France connecting the Saône at Fleurville to Pont-de-Vaux
- Canton of Pont-de-Vaux, an administrative division in eastern France
- Étangs de Vaux et de Baye, a group of lakes in Nièvre, Burgundy, France
- Fort Vaux, a fortress in Vaux-devant-Damloup, Meuse, France
- Lac des Vaux, a lake above Verbier in the canton of Valais, Switzerland
- Notre-Dame-en-Vaux, a church at Châlons-en-Champagne, France
- Roberts Vaux Junior High School, a historic high school building in the North Central neighborhood of Philadelphia, Pennsylvania
- Vaux Moysi, also li Vaux Moysi, Old French name of Wu'ayra Castle; Crusader ruin near Petra, Jordan
- Vaux-de-Cernay Abbey, a Cistercian monastery in northern France (Ile-de-France), situated in Cernay-la-Ville, in the Diocese of Versailles, Yvelines
- Vaux-le-Vicomte, a baroque château in Maincy, France
- Vaux-sur-Morges, a municipality in the Swiss canton of Vaud, in the district of Morges
- Vaux (crater), on Mars

== Other ==
- De Vaux, an automobile produced by the De Vaux-Hall Motors Company of Grand Rapids, Michigan and Oakland, California
- De Vaux Continental, an automobile produced by the Continental-De Vaux Company in Grand Rapids, Michigan
- USS Richard Vaux (1864), a 120-ton canal boat, purchased by the Union Navy at Philadelphia, Pennsylvania
- Vaux's swift (Chaetura vauxi), a small swift native to North America and northern South America

== See also ==
- Fawkes (disambiguation)
- Vaulx (disambiguation)
