= Fowkes =

Fowkes is a surname of English, ultimately of Norman-French, origin. Notable people with the surname include:

- Charles Christopher Fowkes (1894–1966), British army major-general
- Conard Fowkes (1933–2009), American actor
- Maja and Reuben Fowkes (active from 2006), British museum curators and art historians
- Mary Fowkes (1954–2020), American physician
- Robert Fowkes (1913–1998), American linguist
- William Fowkes, English Member of Parliament

== See also ==
- Fowkes Formation, a geological formation in Wyoming, U.S.A.
- Fowkes hypothesis, a first order approximation in physics named after F. M. Fowkes
- Fowkes v Pascoe, an English trusts law case of 1875
- Richards, Fowkes & Co., American builders of historical-style mechanical-action pipe organs
- Fawkes (disambiguation)
- Folkes, a surname
- Foulkes, a surname
- Fowke, a surname
- Vaulx (disambiguation)
- Vaux (disambiguation)
