= Fawkes =

- Pronunciation: Fawks, IPA: [fɔːks]
- Language: Norman

Origin
- Meaning: Valley or Falcon
- Region of origin: British Isles

Other names
- Variant forms: Fakes, Faulks, Faulkes, Fawks, Fawlks, Fawlkes, Foulks, Foulkes, Fowkes

Fawkes is a surname of Norman-French origin, first appearing in the British Isles after the Norman Conquest of England in 1066. The surname may be a corruption of the Norman surname Vaux, which means valley. Notably, Guy Fawkes was sometimes recorded as Guy Vaux. An alternative origin for the surname is that it originates from the pre-6th century Germanic given name of Falco (later Faulques) meaning "falcon". The first recorded spelling of the surname in England is that of one Geoffrey Faukes in 1221.

It is also, less frequently, a given name.

== People ==
=== Surname ===
- Barbara Fawkes (1914–2002), British nurse and nursing educator
- Francis Fawkes (1721–1777), English poet and translator
- Frederick Fawkes (1870–1936), British Conservative Party politician
- George Fawkes (1903–1967), British admiral
- Guy Fawkes (1570–1606), English revolutionary
- Isaac Fawkes (1675?–1732), English conjurer and showman
- Jen Fawkes, American fiction writer
- John Fawkes (born 1933), English cricketer
- Judith Poxson Fawkes (1941–2019), American tapestry weaver
- Madeleine Charlotte Fawkes (1880–1954), English botanical illustrator
- Marion Fawkes (born 1948), British female racewalker
- Randol Fawkes (1924–2000), Bahamian civil rights activist, author, musician
- Richard Fawkes (1944–2020), British writer and director
- Sandy Fawkes (1929–2005), British journalist
- Wally Fawkes (1924–2023), British-Canadian jazz clarinetist and cartoonist
- Walter Fawkes (1769–1825), British landowner and politician, patron of painter J. M. W. Turner
- Wilmot Fawkes (1846–1926), Royal Navy officer, Commander-in-Chief, Plymouth

=== Given name ===
- Fawkes de Breauté, (died 1226), Anglo-Norman soldier who served in the First Barons' War

=== Pseudonym ===
- Guido Fawkes, a pseudonym of British right-wing political blogger Paul Staines

== Fictional characters ==
- Jamison Fawkes (a.k.a. Junkrat), playable character in the 2016 video game Overwatch
- Darien Fawkes, main character of the television series The Invisible Man
- Fawkes, Dumbledore's phoenix in the Harry Potter books
- Fawkes, on the web series The Guild, portrayed by Wil Wheaton
- Fawkes, a Super Mutant character from the 2008 video game Fallout 3

== See also ==
- Vaulx (disambiguation)
- Vaux (disambiguation)
