= Folkes =

Folkes or ffolkes is a surname, and may refer to:

== Folkes ==
- Folkes (foundry), foundry from the United Kingdom established in 1697
- Folkes Brothers, Jamaican mento group
- Cheston Folkes (1863–1941), American politician
- Martin Folkes (1690–1754), English antiquary, numismatist, mathematician and astronomer
- Minetree Folkes (died 1959), American politician from Virginia
- Steve Folkes (1959–2018), Australian professional rugby league footballer and coach
- Warren Davis Folkes, American politician
- William C. Folkes (1845–1890), justice of the Tennessee Supreme Court

== ffolkes ==
- Sir Martin ffolkes, 1st Baronet
- Michael ffolkes (1925–1988), British illustrator and cartoonist
- Sir William ffolkes, 2nd Baronet
- Sir William ffolkes, 3rd Baronet

== Fictional people ==
- Brigadier General Alistair Ffolkes, a character in the first season episode "No Need to Know" of the 1980 American crime drama television series Magnum PI
- Rufus Excalibur ffolkes, character played by Roger Moore in the 1980 British action film North Sea Hijack

== See also ==
- ‹ff›, a Latin alphabet digraph, see List of digraphs in Latin alphabets#F
- ffolkes baronets
- North Sea Hijack, a 1980 British action film starring Roger Moore released in the US as ffolkes.
- Fowkes (disambiguation)
