= Ivry-en-Montagne =

- Part of Val-Mont
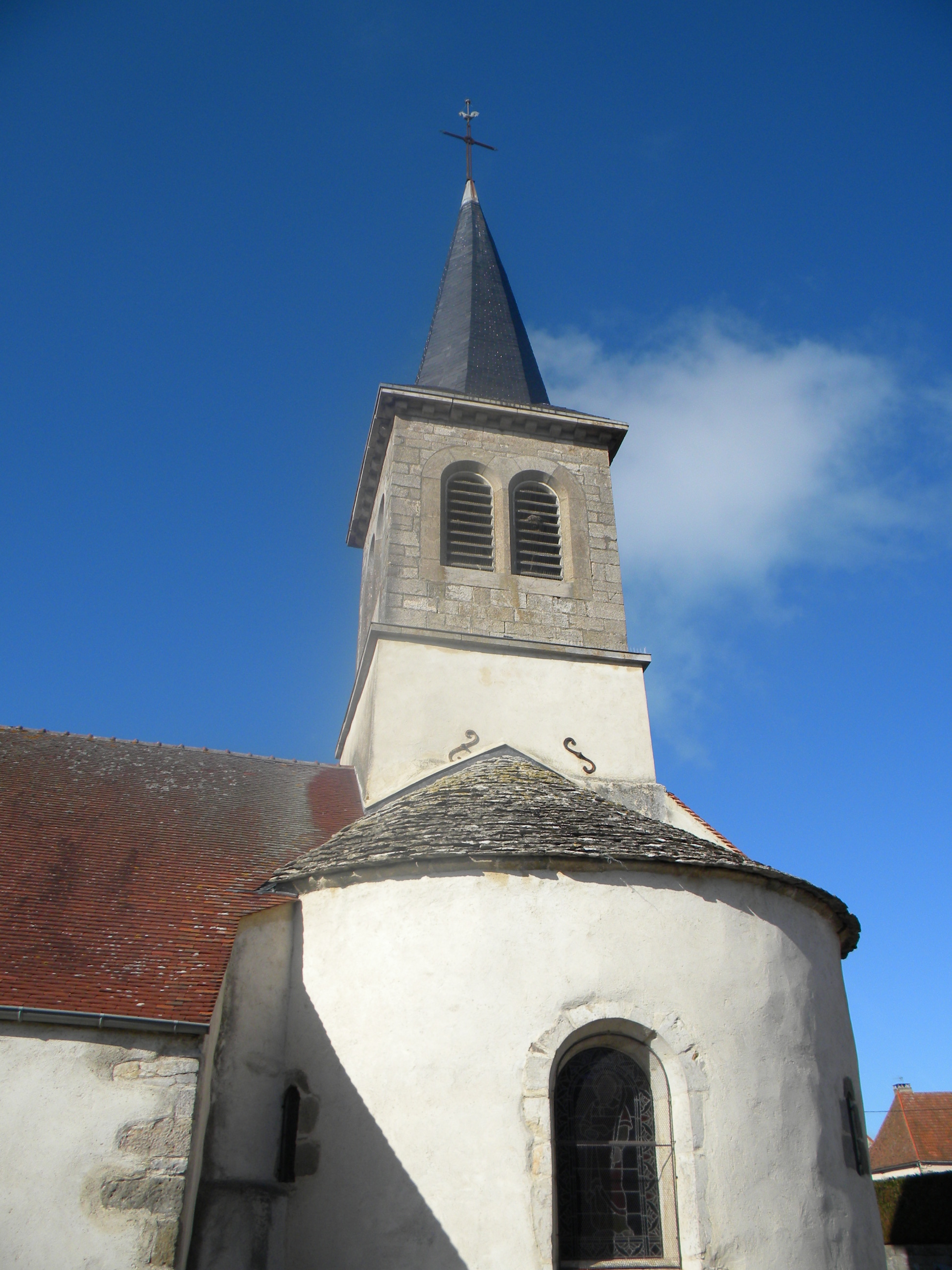

- Coat of arms
- Location of Ivry-en-Montagne
- Location within France Location within Bourgogne-Franche-Comté
- Coordinates: 47°01′49″N 4°38′12″E
- Country: France
- Region: Bourgogne-Franche-Comté
- Department: Côte-d'Or
- Arrondissement: Beaune
- Canton: Arnay-le-Duc
- Commune: Val-Mont
- Area^{1}: 11.09 km^{2} (4.28 sq mi)
- Highest elevation: 553 m (1,814 ft)
- Lowest elevation: 390 m (1,280 ft)
- Population (2019): 161
  - Density: 14.5/km^{2} (37.6/sq mi)
- Time zone: UTC+01:00 (CET)
  - Summer (DST): UTC+02:00 (CEST)
- Postal code: 21340
- ^{1} French Land Register data, which excludes lakes, ponds, glaciers > 1 km^{2} (0.386 sq mi or 247 acres) and river estuaries.

Ivry-en-Montagne (French pronunciation: [ivʁi ɑ̃ mɔ̃taɲ]) is a former commune in the Côte-d'Or department in eastern France. On 1 January 2016, it was merged into the new commune Val-Mont.

== See also ==
- Communes of the Côte-d'Or department
