= Le Montsaugeonnais =

- Commune
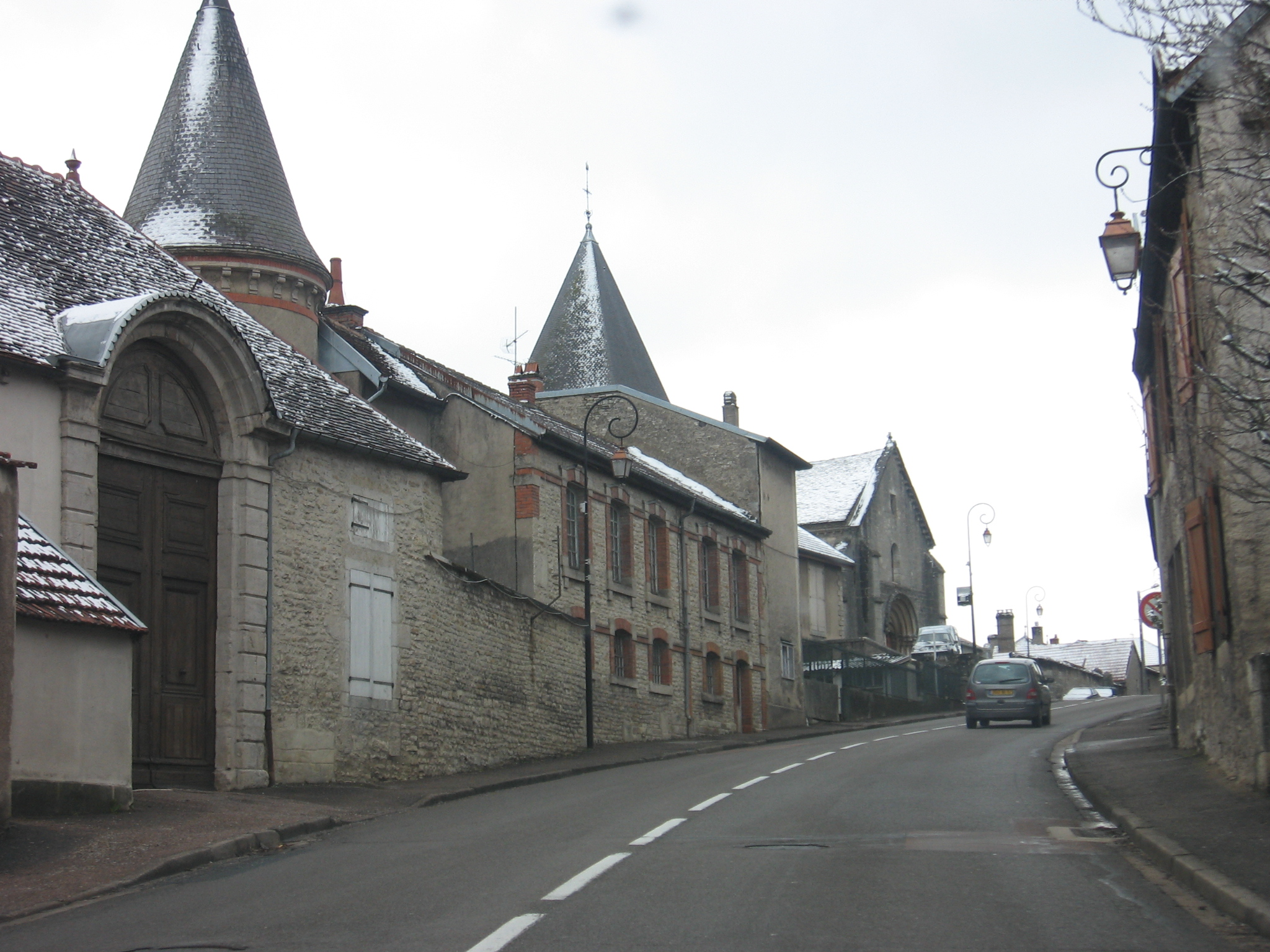
- A view within Prauthoy
- Location of Le Montsaugeonnais
- Location within France Location within Grand Est
- Coordinates: 47°40′48″N 5°17′35″E
- Country: France
- Region: Grand Est
- Department: Haute-Marne
- Arrondissement: Langres
- Canton: Villegusien-le-Lac

Government
  - Mayor (2020–2026): Olivier Oliveira-Cruz
- Area^{1}: 33.33 km^{2} (12.87 sq mi)
- Population (2023): 1,140
  - Density: 34.2/km^{2} (88.6/sq mi)
- Time zone: UTC+01:00 (CET)
  - Summer (DST): UTC+02:00 (CEST)
- INSEE/Postal code: 52405 /52190
- ^{1} French Land Register data, which excludes lakes, ponds, glaciers > 1 km^{2} (0.386 sq mi or 247 acres) and river estuaries.

Le Montsaugeonnais (French pronunciation: [lə mɔ̃soʒɔnɛ]) is a commune in the Haute-Marne department of northeastern France. The municipality was established on 1 January 2016 and consists of the former communes of Montsaugeon, Prauthoy and Vaux-sous-Aubigny.

== See also ==
- Communes of the Haute-Marne department
