= Faulkes =

Faulkes may refer to:

- Dill Faulkes (born 1944), British businessman
- William Faulkes (1863–1933), English musician and composer
- 47144 Faulkes, an asteroid named after Dill Faulkes

== See also ==
- Faulks, a surname
- Fawkes (disambiguation)
