= Val-Mont =

- Commune
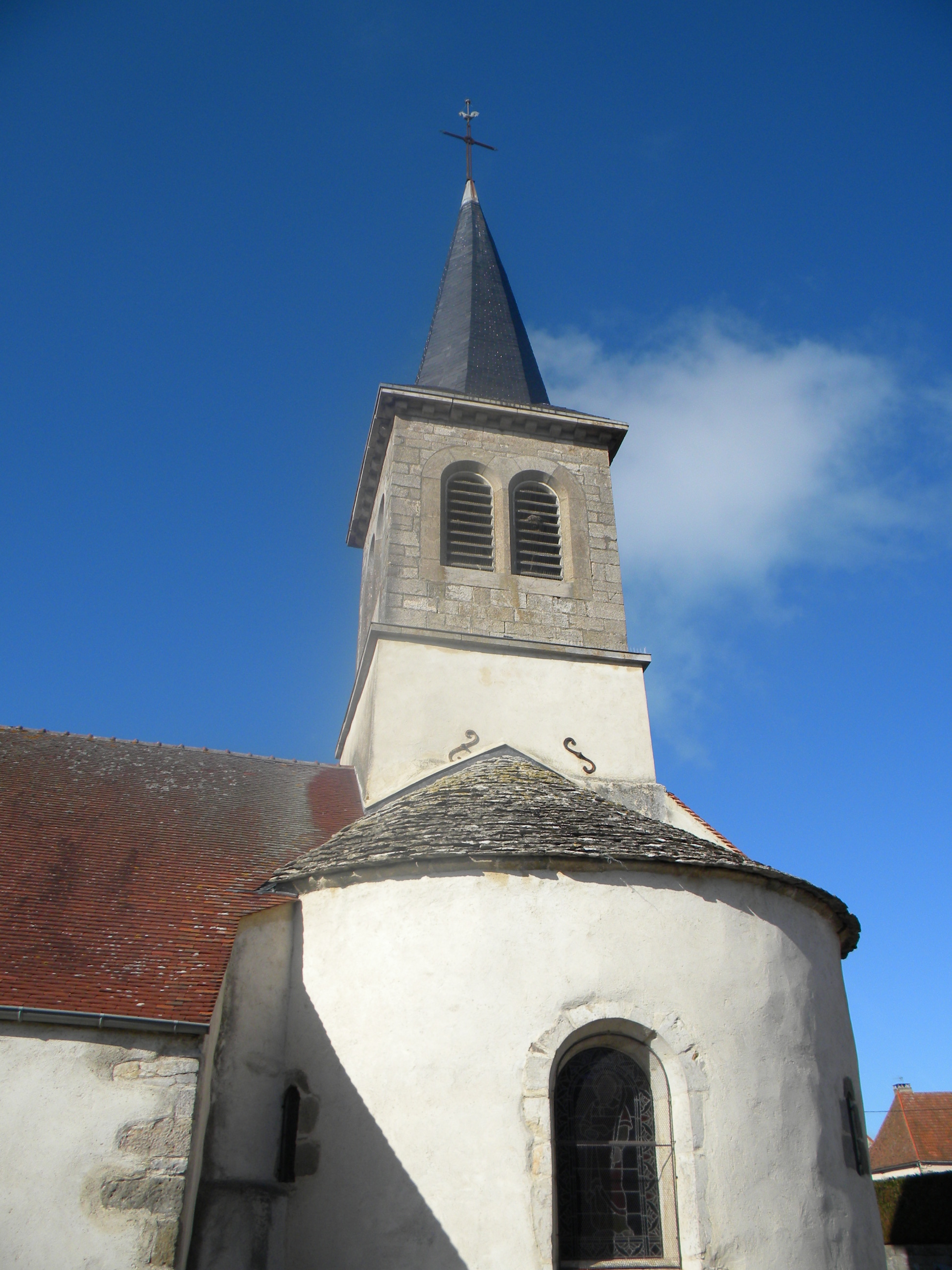
- Church in Ivry-en-Montagne
- Location of Val-Mont
- Location within France Location within Bourgogne-Franche-Comté
- Coordinates: 47°02′35″N 4°35′06″E
- Country: France
- Region: Bourgogne-Franche-Comté
- Department: Côte-d'Or
- Arrondissement: Beaune
- Canton: Arnay-le-Duc
- Intercommunality: CA Beaune Côte et Sud

Government
  - Mayor (2020–2026): Daniel Carrier
- Area^{1}: 19.90 km^{2} (7.68 sq mi)
- Population (2023): 251
  - Density: 12.6/km^{2} (32.7/sq mi)
- Time zone: UTC+01:00 (CET)
  - Summer (DST): UTC+02:00 (CEST)
- INSEE/Postal code: 21327 /21340
- ^{1} French Land Register data, which excludes lakes, ponds, glaciers > 1 km^{2} (0.386 sq mi or 247 acres) and river estuaries.

Val-Mont (French pronunciation: [val mɔ̃]) is a commune in the Côte-d'Or department of eastern France. The municipality was established on 1 January 2016 and consists of the former communes of Jours-en-Vaux and Ivry-en-Montagne.

== See also ==
- Communes of the Côte-d'Or department
