= Fowke =

Fowke is a surname. Notable people with the surname include:

- Edith Fowke
- Francis Fowke (1823–1865), British engineer and architect
- Frederick Luther Fowke
- George Henry Fowke
- Gerard Fowke
- Gustavus Fowke (1880–1946), English soldier and cricketer
- John Fowke
- Martha Fowke
- Philip Fowke
- Phineas Fowke
- Thomas Fowke

== See also ==
- Fowke baronets
- Fowkes (disambiguation)
