= Charles de Vaulx =

Casablanca, Moroccan born, asset manager (died 2021)

Charles de Vaulx (31 October 1961 – 26 April 2021) was an American asset manager. He was chief investment officer, co-portfolio manager, and partner at International Value Advisers, LLC.

== Background and history ==
Born in Morocco, de Vaulx earned a Master in Finance from Ecole Supérieure de Commerce de Rouen, France. In January 1987, de Vaulx joined the SoGen Funds, a branch of Société Générale, working under Jean-Marie Eveillard as an analyst. In August 1996, de Vaulx became an associate portfolio manager. In 1999, Société Générale sold the SoGen Funds to Arnold and S. Bleichroeder Advisers and the funds were renamed First Eagle Funds. In January 2000, de Vaulx was made co-portfolio manager of four First Eagle funds and a number of institutional accounts. In December 2001 he and his colleague Jean-Marie Eveillard were awarded Morningstar's "International Stock Manager of the Year." De Vaulx was designated as the hand-picked successor to Eveillard who went on to retire in December 2004, making de Vaulx the lead portfolio manager in January 2005. Surprising the industry, de Vaulx left First Eagle, just weeks after winning another Morningstar award in December 2006 as the runner-up for "International Stock Manager of the Year." In 2008, de Vaulx joined International Value Advisers, and served as chief investment officer, co-portfolio manager, and partner.

In a 2019 interview with Morningstar, de Vaulx mentioned he had recently become a naturalized U.S. citizen.

In March 2021, International Value Advisers announced it would liquidate its funds and close up shop because its assets under management had collapsed from $20 billion to under $1 billion as a result of client redemption. The departure of investors from IVA was attributed in part to a generalized slump for the value investing strategies de Vaulx favored, and also due to the July 2020 departure of his partner and presumed successor Chuck de Lardemelle which was perceived as a sign of strife within the company.

== Death ==
On 26 April 2021, de Vaulx committed suicide by jumping from the 10th floor of the International Value Advisors office building. He is survived by his wife and their two children. He was 59.
