= Prauthoy =

- Part of Le Montsaugeonnais
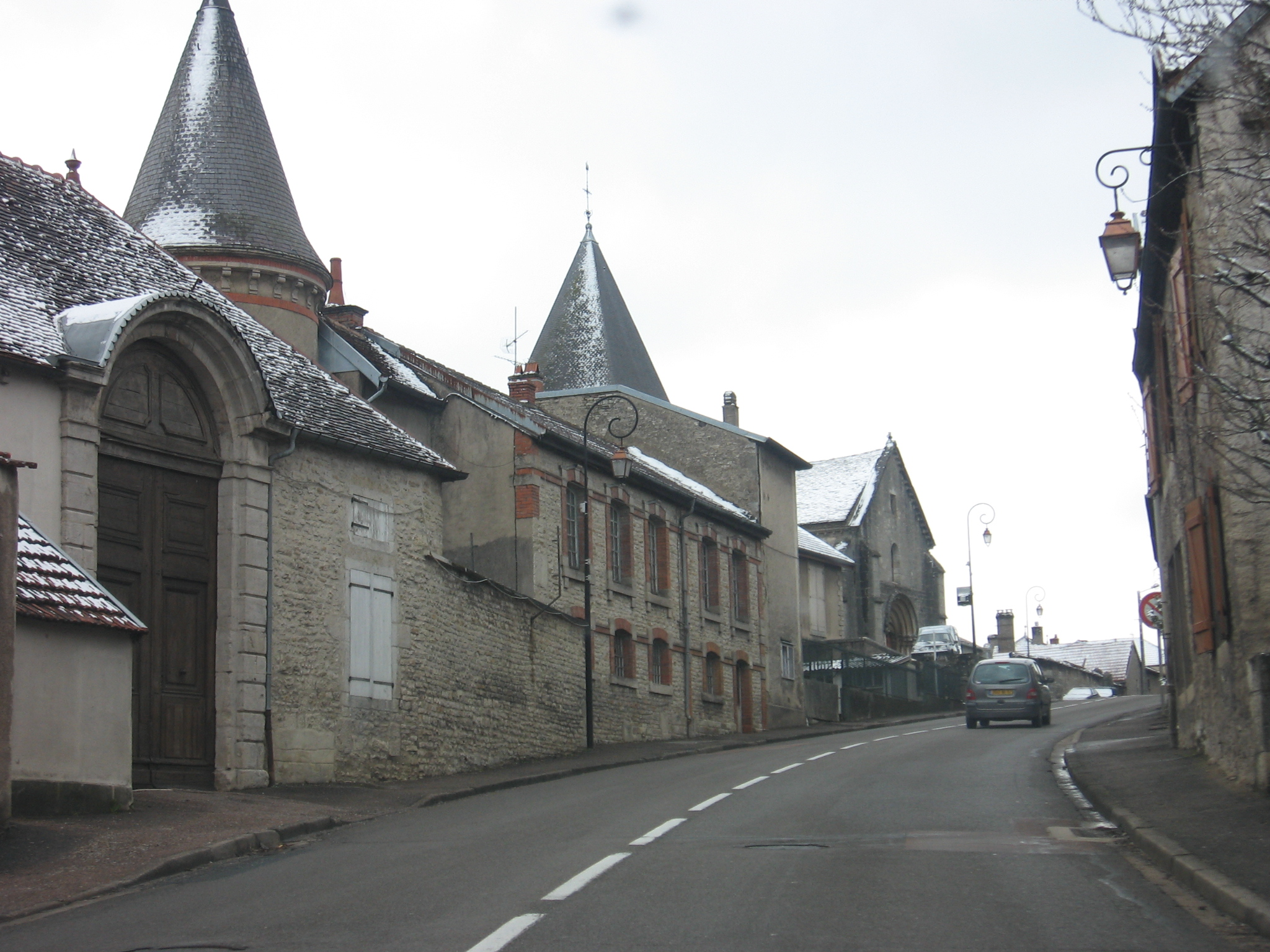
- Prauthoy

- Coat of arms
- Location of Prauthoy
- Location within France Location within Grand Est
- Coordinates: 47°40′50″N 5°17′39″E
- Country: France
- Region: Grand Est
- Department: Haute-Marne
- Arrondissement: Langres
- Canton: Villegusien-le-Lac
- Commune: Le Montsaugeonnais
- Area^{1}: 12.3 km^{2} (4.7 sq mi)
- Elevation: 300 m (980 ft)
- Population (2022): 384
  - Density: 31.2/km^{2} (80.9/sq mi)
- Demonym(s): Prauthoyens, Prauthoyennes
- Time zone: UTC+01:00 (CET)
  - Summer (DST): UTC+02:00 (CEST)
- Postal code: 52190
- ^{1} French Land Register data, which excludes lakes, ponds, glaciers > 1 km^{2} (0.386 sq mi or 247 acres) and river estuaries.

Prauthoy (French pronunciation: [pʁotwa]) is a former commune in the Haute-Marne department in north-eastern France. On 1 January 2016, it was merged into the new commune Le Montsaugeonnais.

== See also ==
- Communes of the Haute-Marne department
