= Montsaugeon =

Commune in Haute-Marne, France

- Part of Le Montsaugeonnais
- Location of Montsaugeon
- Location within France Location within Grand Est
- Coordinates: 47°40′00″N 5°18′35″E
- Country: France
- Region: Grand Est
- Department: Haute-Marne
- Arrondissement: Langres
- Canton: Villegusien-le-Lac
- Commune: Le Montsaugeonnais
- Area^{1}: 6.32 km^{2} (2.44 sq mi)
- Elevation: 332 m (1,089 ft)
- Population (2022): 79
  - Density: 13/km^{2} (32/sq mi)
- Time zone: UTC+01:00 (CET)
  - Summer (DST): UTC+02:00 (CEST)
- Postal code: 52190
- ^{1} French Land Register data, which excludes lakes, ponds, glaciers > 1 km^{2} (0.386 sq mi or 247 acres) and river estuaries.

Montsaugeon (French pronunciation: [mɔ̃soʒɔ̃]) is a former commune in the Haute-Marne department in north-eastern France. On 1 January 2016, it was merged into the new commune Le Montsaugeonnais. Its population was 79 in 2022.

== See also ==
- Communes of the Haute-Marne department
