= Rubigny =

- Commune
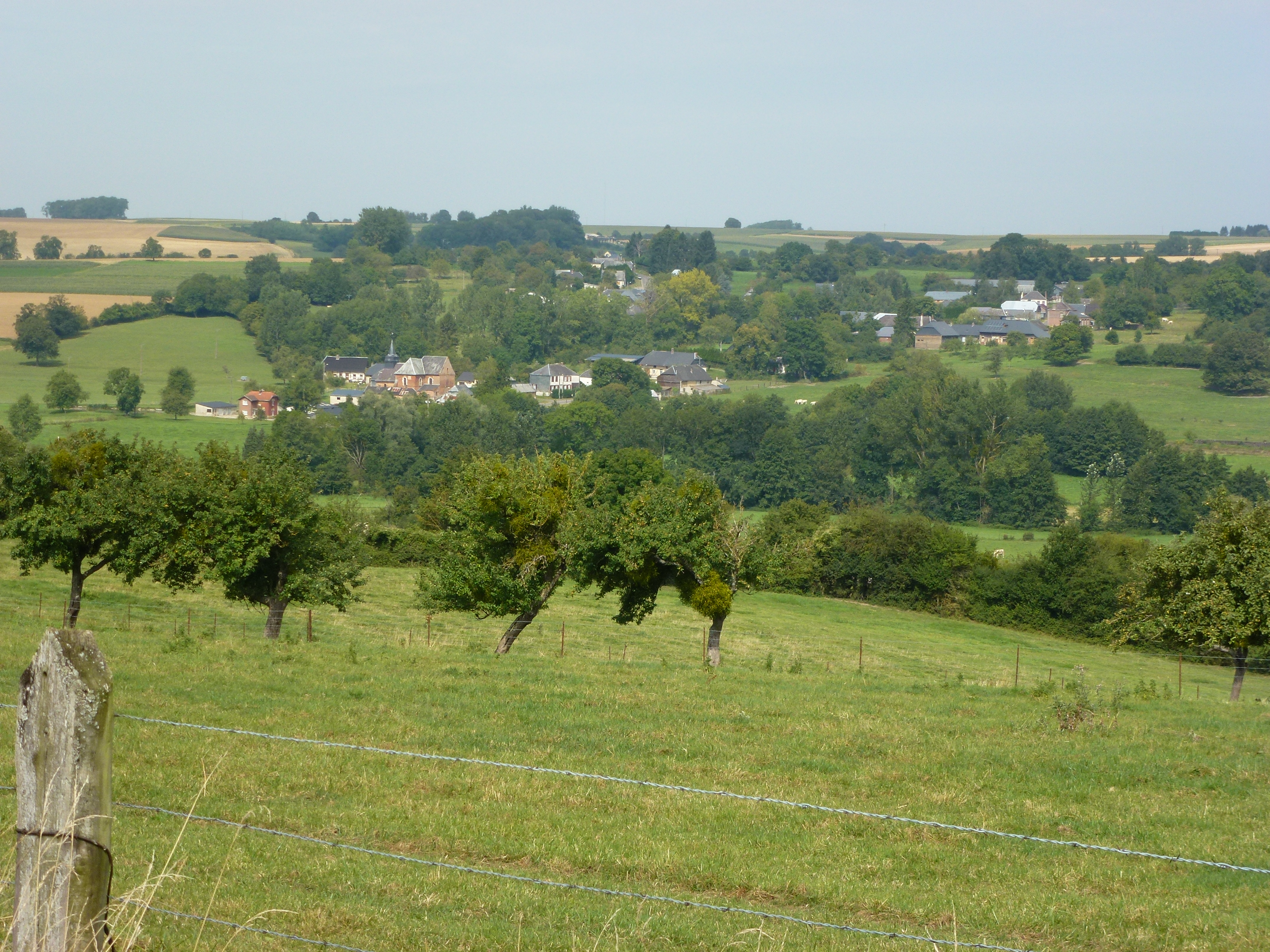
- A general view of Rubigny
- Location of Rubigny
- Location within France Location within Grand Est
- Coordinates: 49°41′11″N 4°11′44″E
- Country: France
- Region: Grand Est
- Department: Ardennes
- Arrondissement: Rethel
- Canton: Signy-l'Abbaye
- Intercommunality: Crêtes Préardennaises

Government
  - Mayor (2020–2026): Daniel Baudrillard
- Area^{1}: 5.12 km^{2} (1.98 sq mi)
- Elevation: 170 m (560 ft)
- Population (2023): 55
  - Density: 11/km^{2} (28/sq mi)
- Time zone: UTC+01:00 (CET)
  - Summer (DST): UTC+02:00 (CEST)
- INSEE/Postal code: 08372 /08220
- ^{1} French Land Register data, which excludes lakes, ponds, glaciers > 1 km^{2} (0.386 sq mi or 247 acres) and river estuaries.

Rubigny (French pronunciation: [ʁybiɲi]) is a commune in the Ardennes department in northern France.

It is located 60 km north of Reims, at the junction of the D8 and D36 routes. Neighbouring villages are Wadimont and Vaux-lès-Rubigny.

== Population ==
Historical population
Year	Pop.	±% p.a.
1968	104	—
1975	89	−2.20%
1982	64	−4.60%
1990	76	+2.17%
1999	64	−1.89%
2007	74	+1.83%
2012	73	−0.27%
2017	67	−1.70%
2023	55	−3.24%
Source: INSEE

== See also ==
- Communes of the Ardennes department
