= Poligny, Jura =

Commune in Bourgogne-Franche-Comté, France

Poligny
- Commune
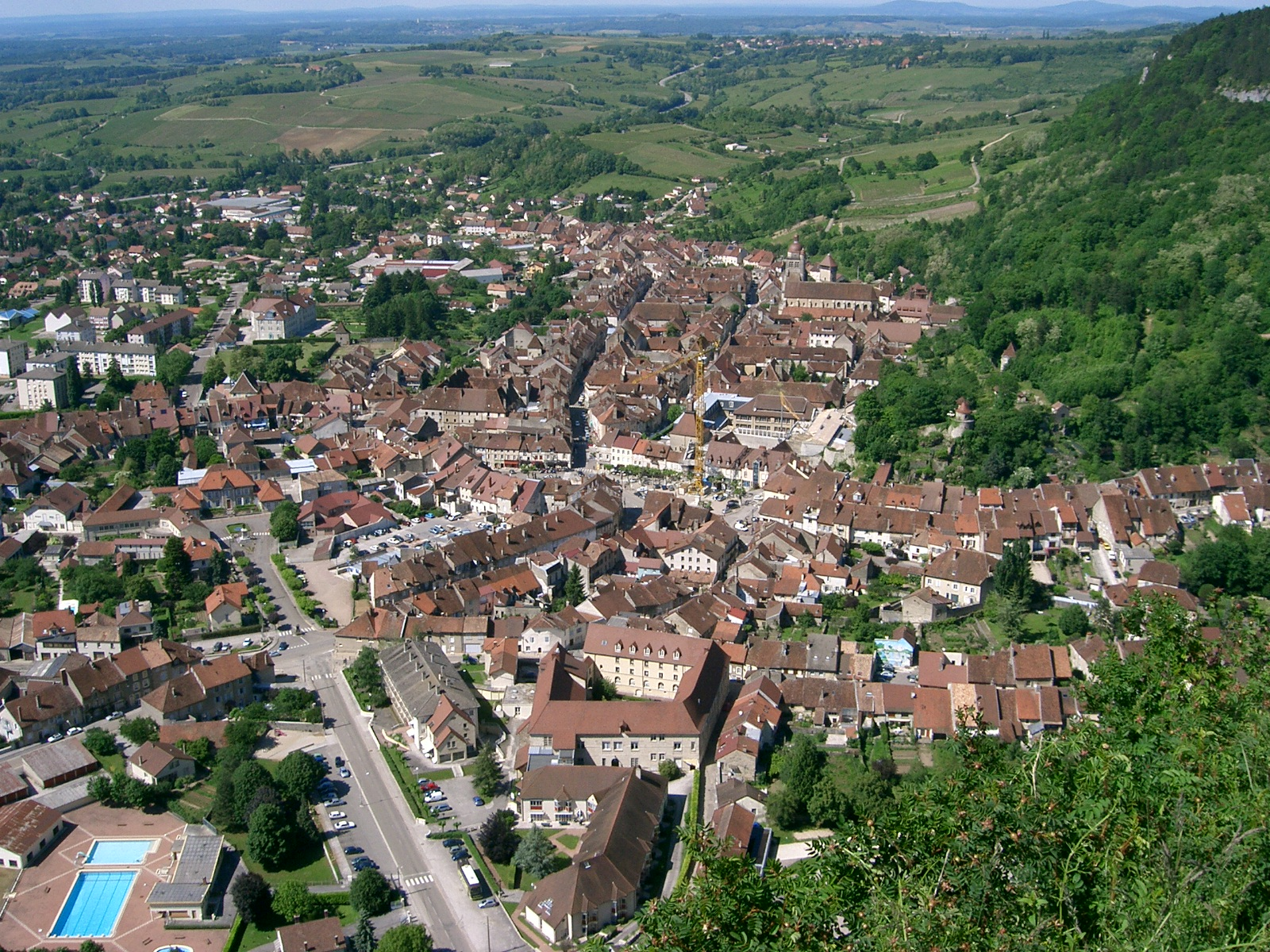
- A general view of Poligny

- Flag Coat of arms
- Location of Poligny
- Location within France Location within Bourgogne-Franche-Comté
- Coordinates: 46°50′12″N 5°42′31″E
- Country: France
- Region: Bourgogne-Franche-Comté
- Department: Jura
- Arrondissement: Dole
- Canton: Poligny
- Intercommunality: CC Arbois, Poligny, Salins - Coeur du Jura

Government
  - Mayor (2025–2026): Dominique Bonnet
- Area^{1}: 51.48 km^{2} (19.88 sq mi)
- Highest elevation: 626 m (2,054 ft)
- Lowest elevation: 252 m (827 ft)
- Population (2023): 3,976
  - Density: 77.23/km^{2} (200.0/sq mi)
- Time zone: UTC+01:00 (CET)
  - Summer (DST): UTC+02:00 (CEST)
- INSEE/Postal code: 39434 /39800
- ^{1} French Land Register data, which excludes lakes, ponds, glaciers > 1 km^{2} (0.386 sq mi or 247 acres) and river estuaries.

Poligny (French pronunciation: [pɔliɲi]; Arpitan: Poulegny) is a commune in the Jura department in Bourgogne-Franche-Comté in eastern France.

The town stands at the foot of the first plateau of the Jura region, with limestone cliffs rising to its east and south, and a steephead valley leading to the village of Vaux-sur-Poligny to the east. On the cliffs to the east is a notable cave, known as "Le Trou de la Lune" (the Moonhole); on the cliffs to the south is a large cross, the "Croix du Dan". A network of hiking trails surrounds the town and provide routes to both these viewpoints, and the GR 59 long distance footpath runs through the town.

First Empire general Jean-Pierre Travot was born in Poligny; a statue in his honour stands in the principal square of the town, the Place des Déportés, and a road is named after him.

Poligny is served by the railway line from Besançon to Lons-le-Saunier.

The town is recognised as the "Capital of Comté", with a third of the region's production of this much-loved cheese being aged in the town's cellars. The town is also surrounded by vineyards, and is home to a number of independent wine producers as well as a cooperative. On 1 January 2025, the former commune of Vaux-sur-Poligny was merged into Poligny.

== Population ==
The population data in the table below for 2012 and later refer to the new commune of Poligny, including Vaux-sur-Poligny.

Historical population

| Year | Pop. | ±% p.a. |
|---|---|---|
| 1793 | 5,198 | — |
| 1800 | 5,388 | +0.51% |
| 1806 | 5,427 | +0.12% |
| 1821 | 5,344 | −0.10% |
| 1831 | 6,005 | +1.17% |
| 1836 | 6,492 | +1.57% |
| 1841 | 5,980 | −1.63% |
| 1846 | 5,911 | −0.23% |
| 1851 | 5,718 | −0.66% |
| 1856 | 5,364 | −1.27% |
| 1861 | 5,401 | +0.14% |
| 1866 | 5,392 | −0.03% |
| 1872 | 5,024 | −1.17% |
| 1876 | 5,010 | −0.07% |
| 1881 | 4,669 | −1.40% |
| 1886 | 4,632 | −0.16% |
| 1891 | 4,433 | −0.87% |
| 1896 | 4,321 | −0.51% |
| 1901 | 4,090 | −1.09% |

| Year | Pop. | ±% p.a. |
|---|---|---|
| 1906 | 4,092 | +0.01% |
| 1911 | 3,921 | −0.85% |
| 1921 | 3,576 | −0.92% |
| 1926 | 3,687 | +0.61% |
| 1931 | 3,736 | +0.26% |
| 1936 | 3,580 | −0.85% |
| 1946 | 4,056 | +1.26% |
| 1954 | 4,130 | +0.23% |
| 1962 | 3,869 | −0.81% |
| 1968 | 4,070 | +0.85% |
| 1975 | 4,312 | +0.83% |
| 1982 | 4,655 | +1.10% |
| 1990 | 4,714 | +0.16% |
| 1999 | 4,511 | −0.49% |
| 2006 | 4,377 | −0.43% |
| 2012 | 4,254 | −0.47% |
| 2017 | 4,124 | −0.62% |
| 2023 | 3,976 | −0.61% |

Source: EHESS and INSEE (2012-2023)

== Gallery ==
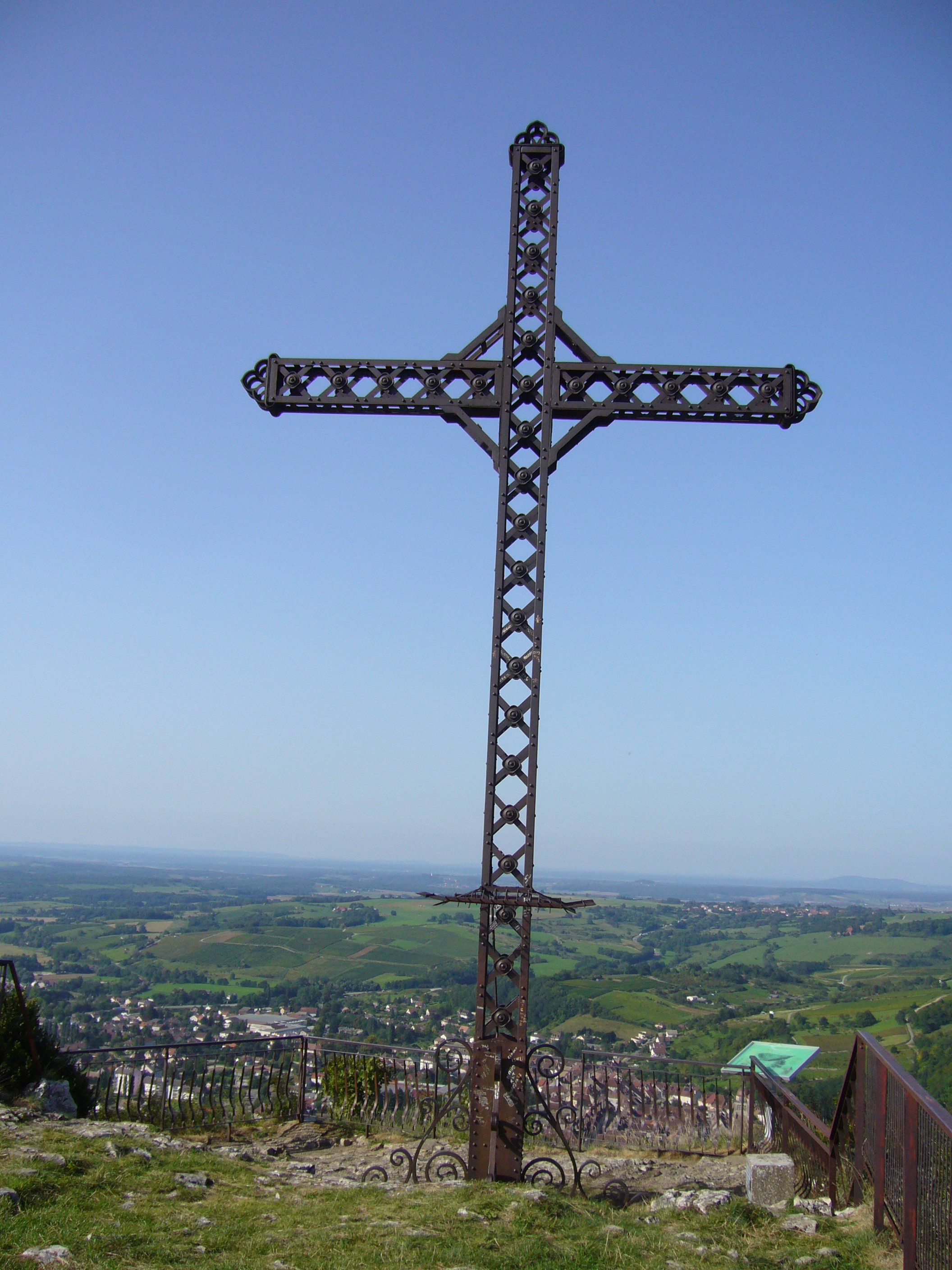
Croix du Dan

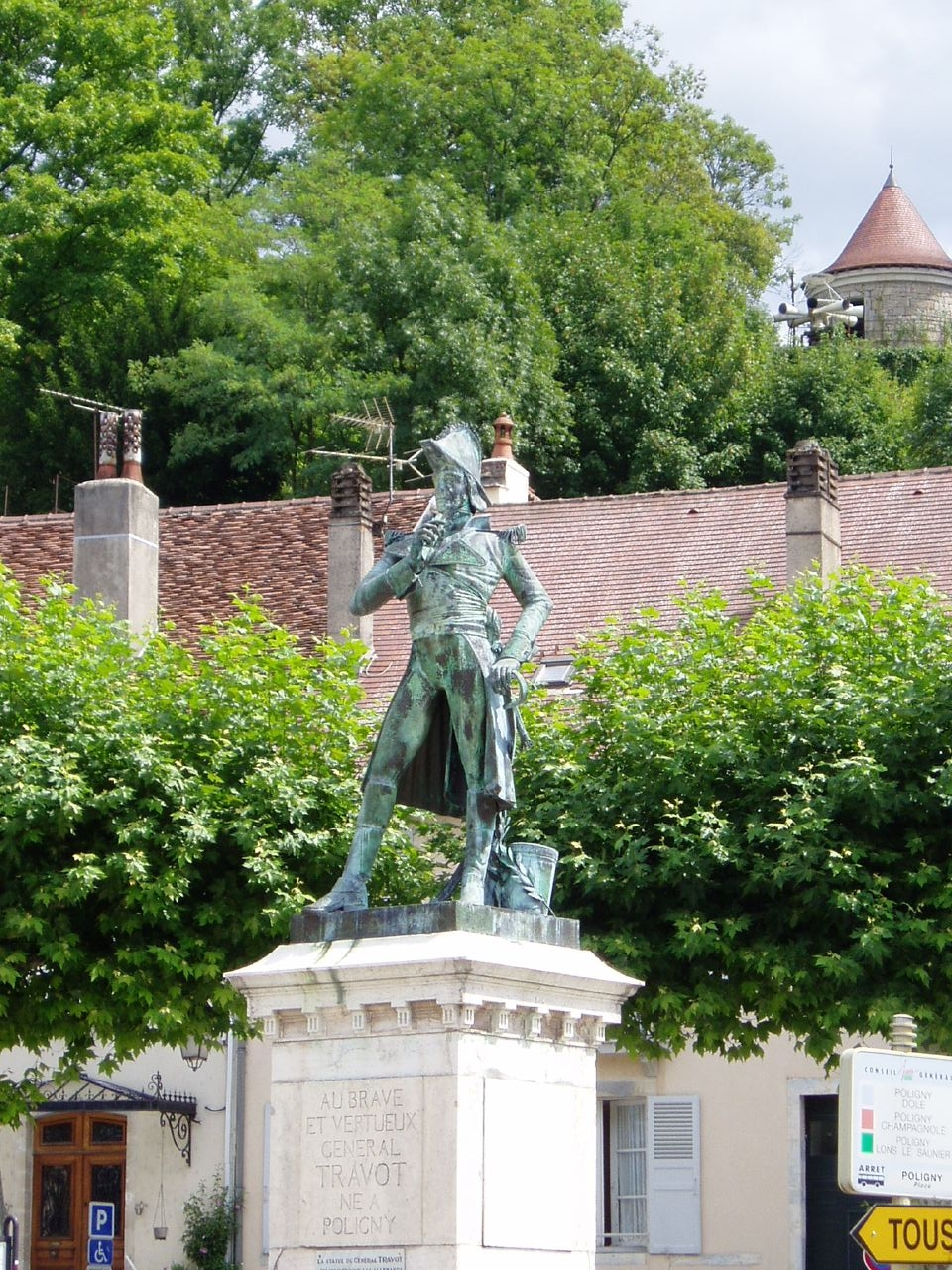
Général Travot

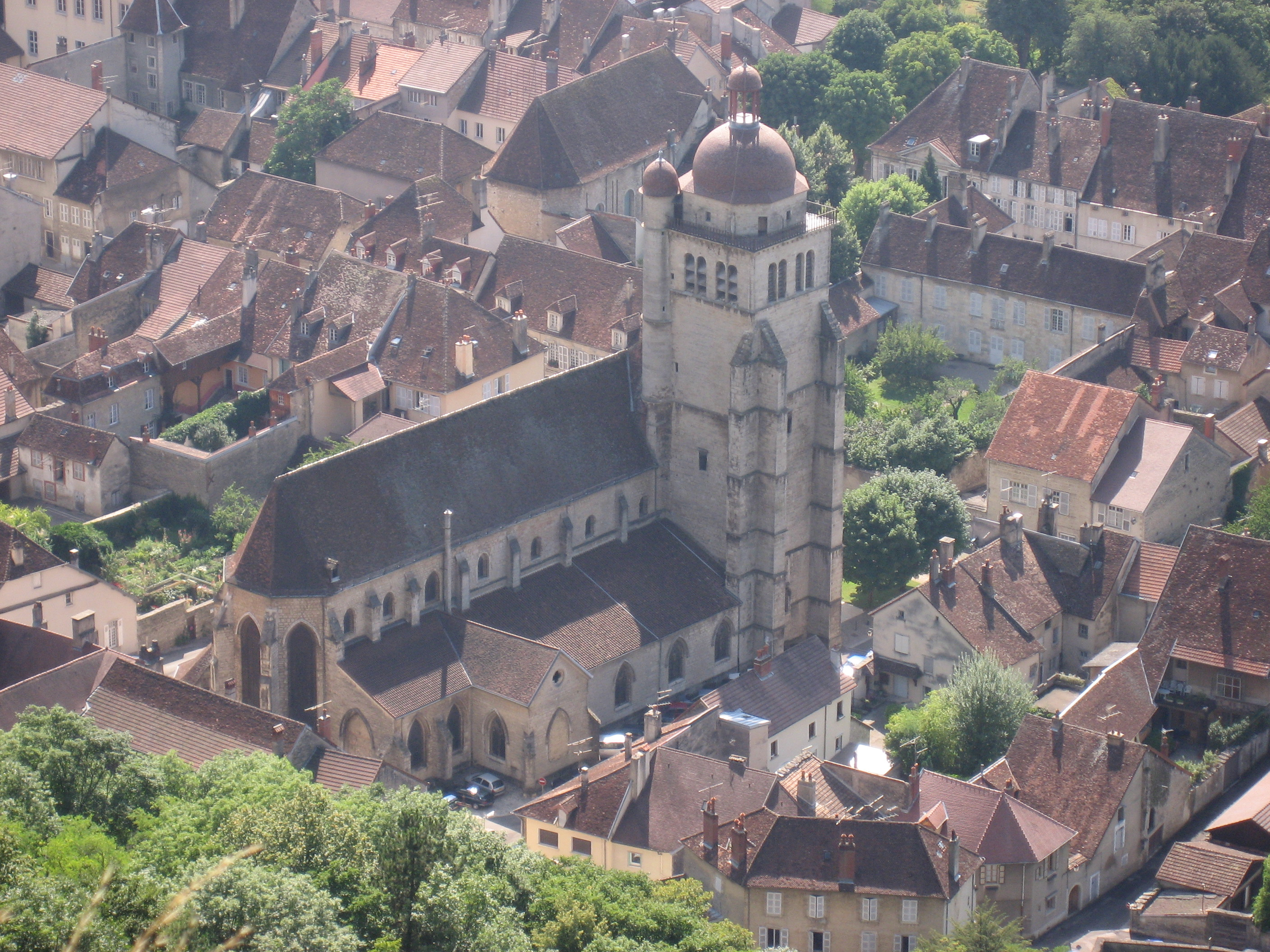
Collégiale St.Hippolyte

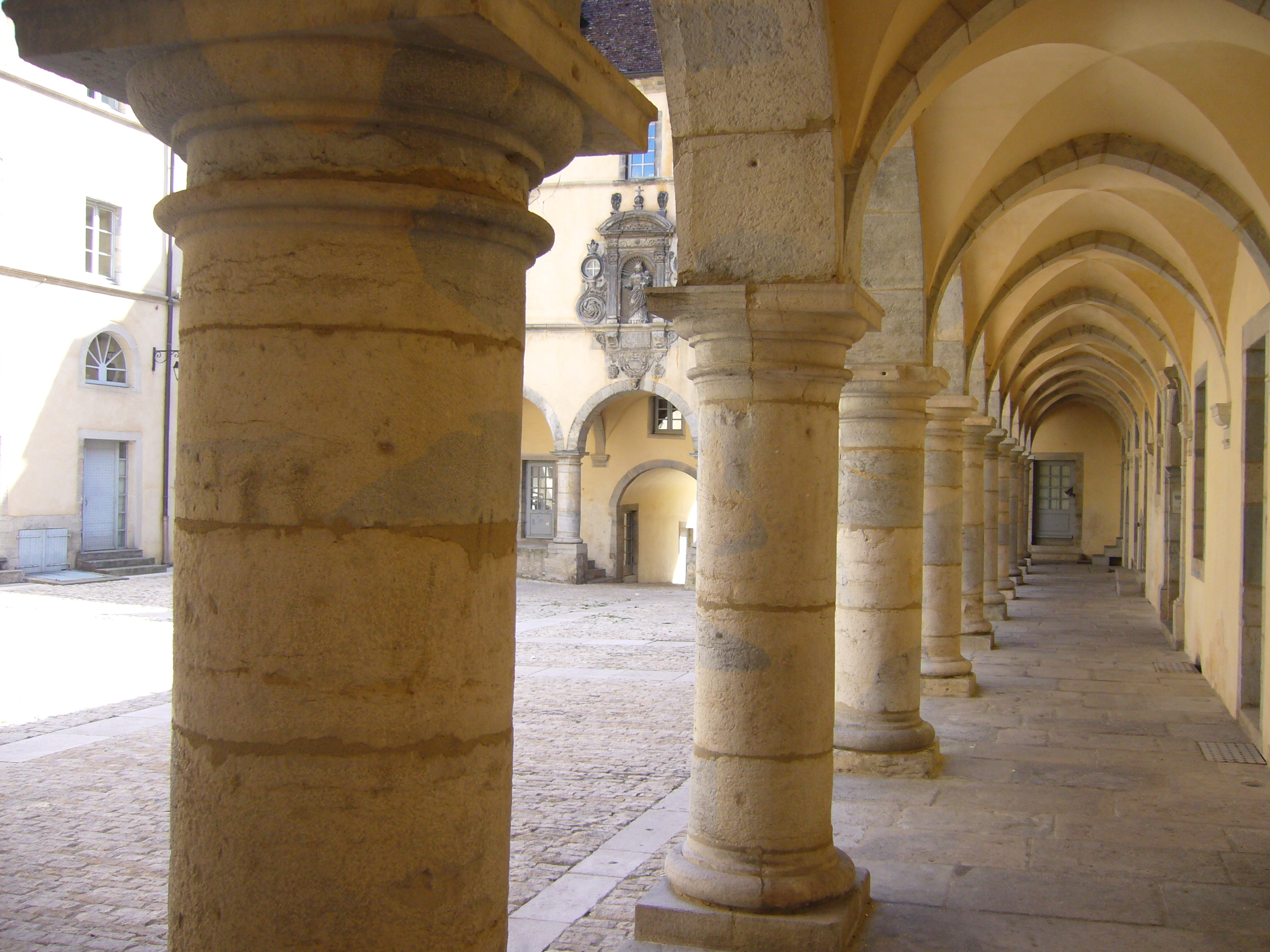
Convent des Ursulines

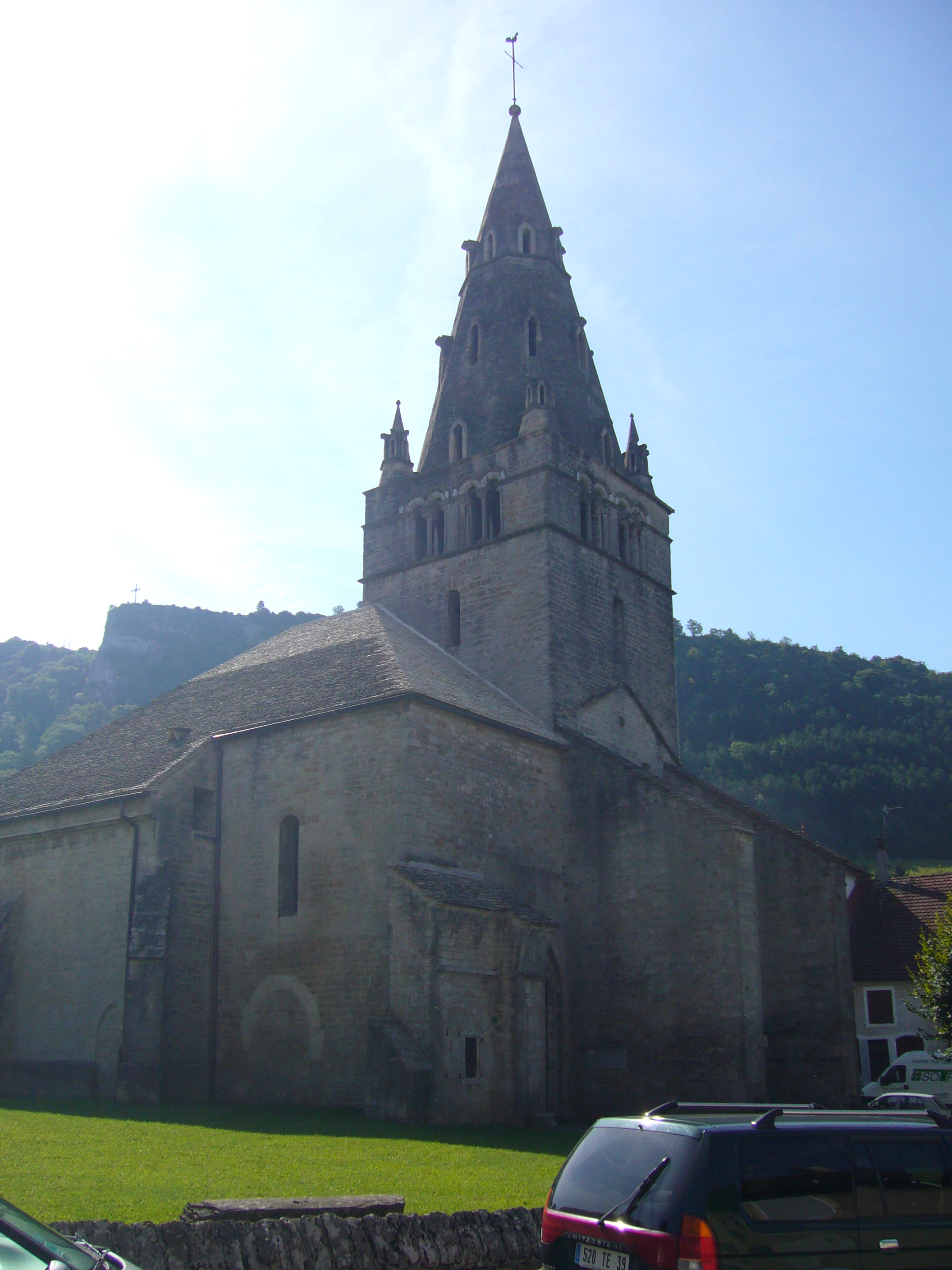
Mouthier le Vieillard

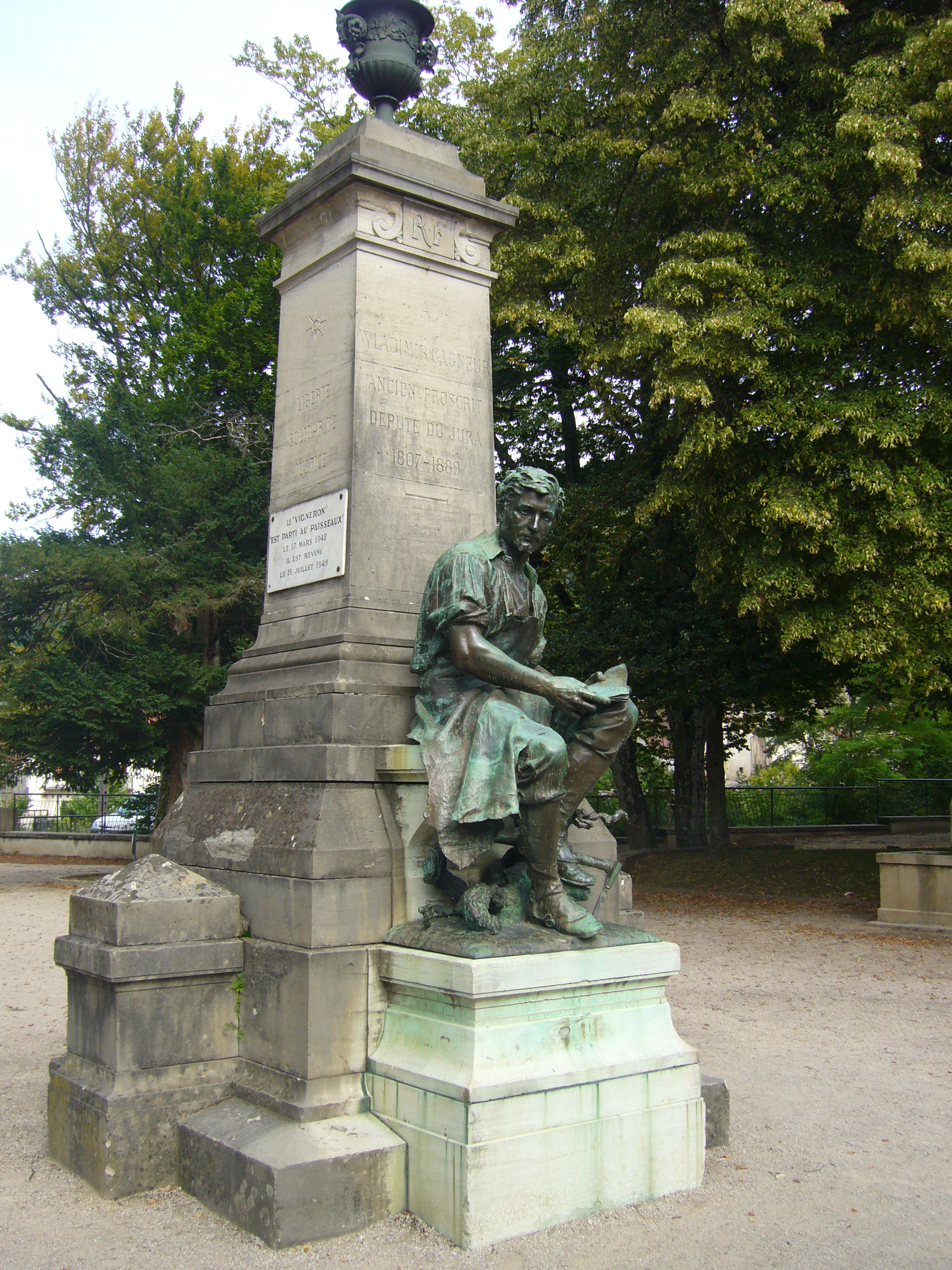
Wladimir Gagneur

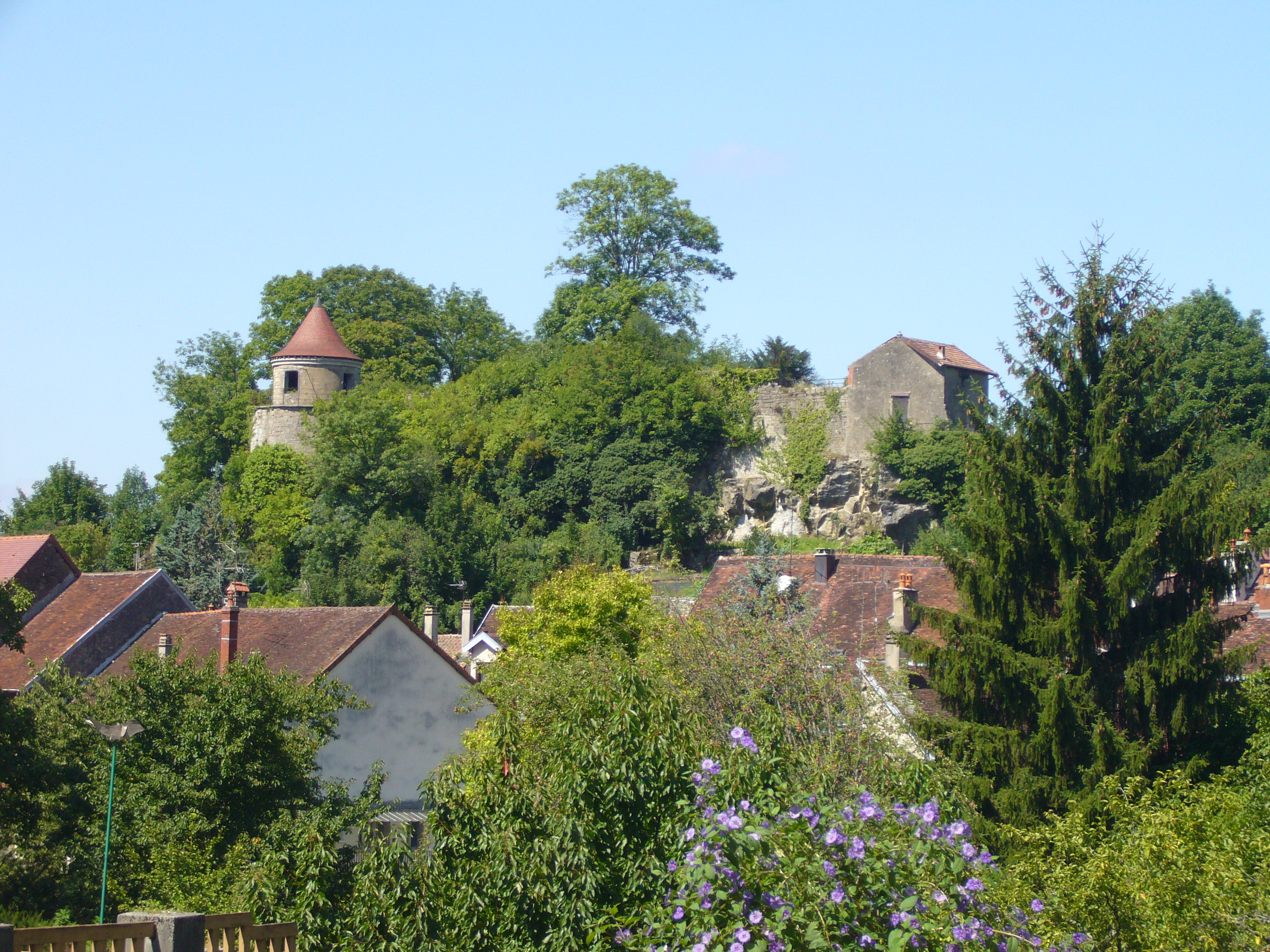
Tower of Paravis

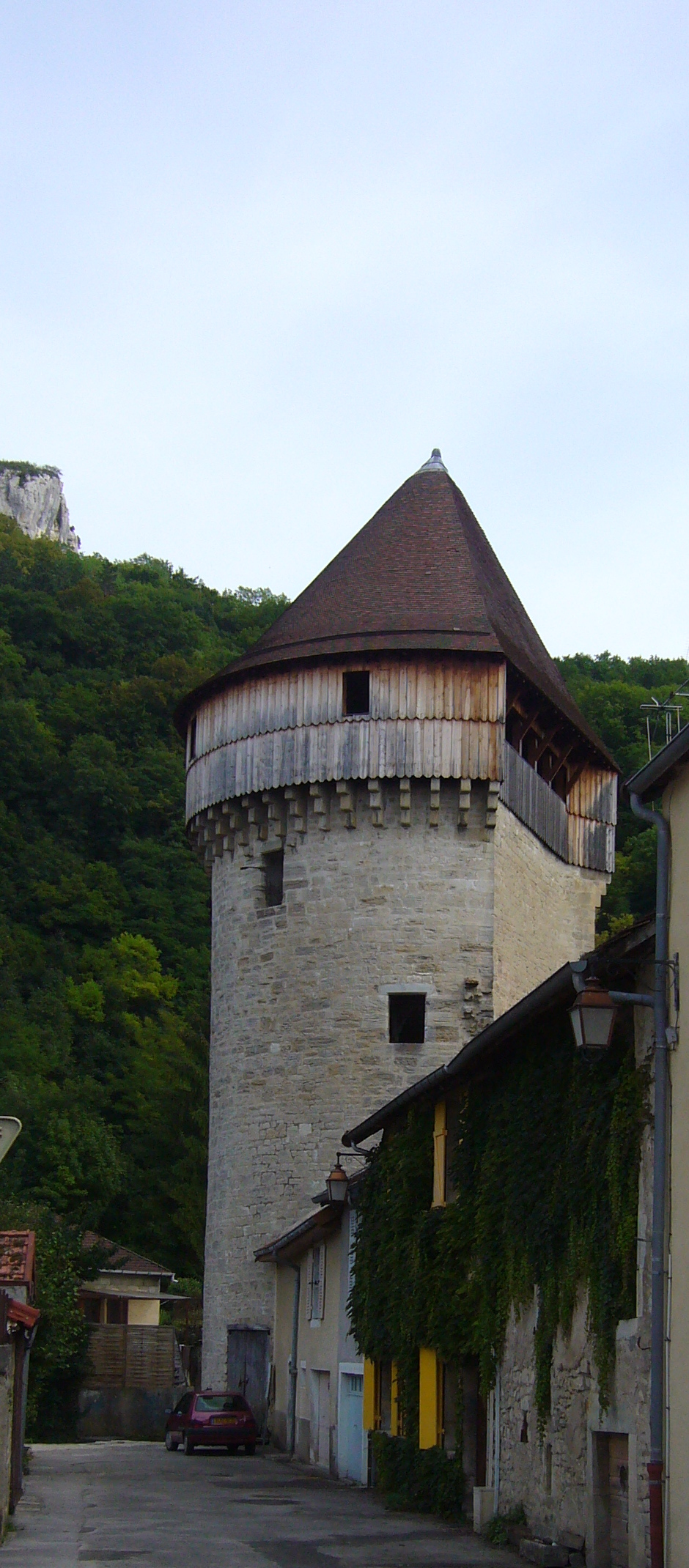
Tower of the "Sergenterie"

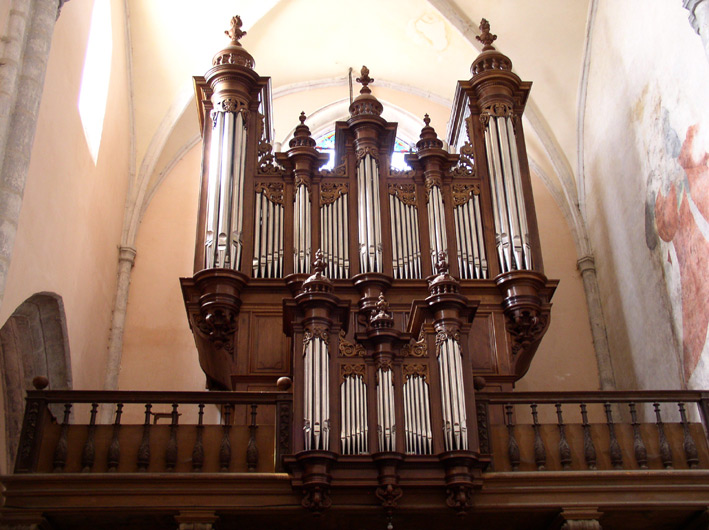

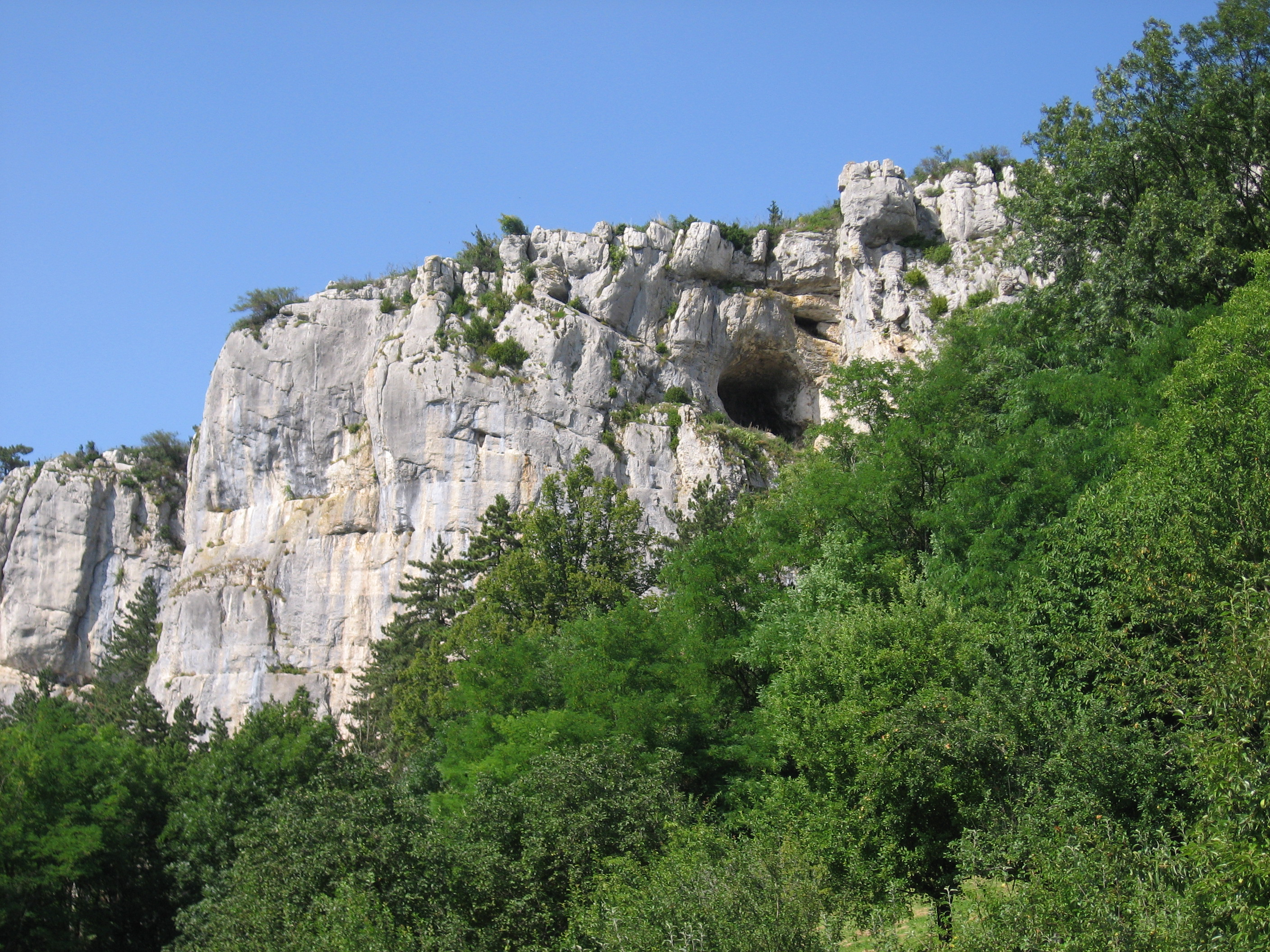
Le Moon hole

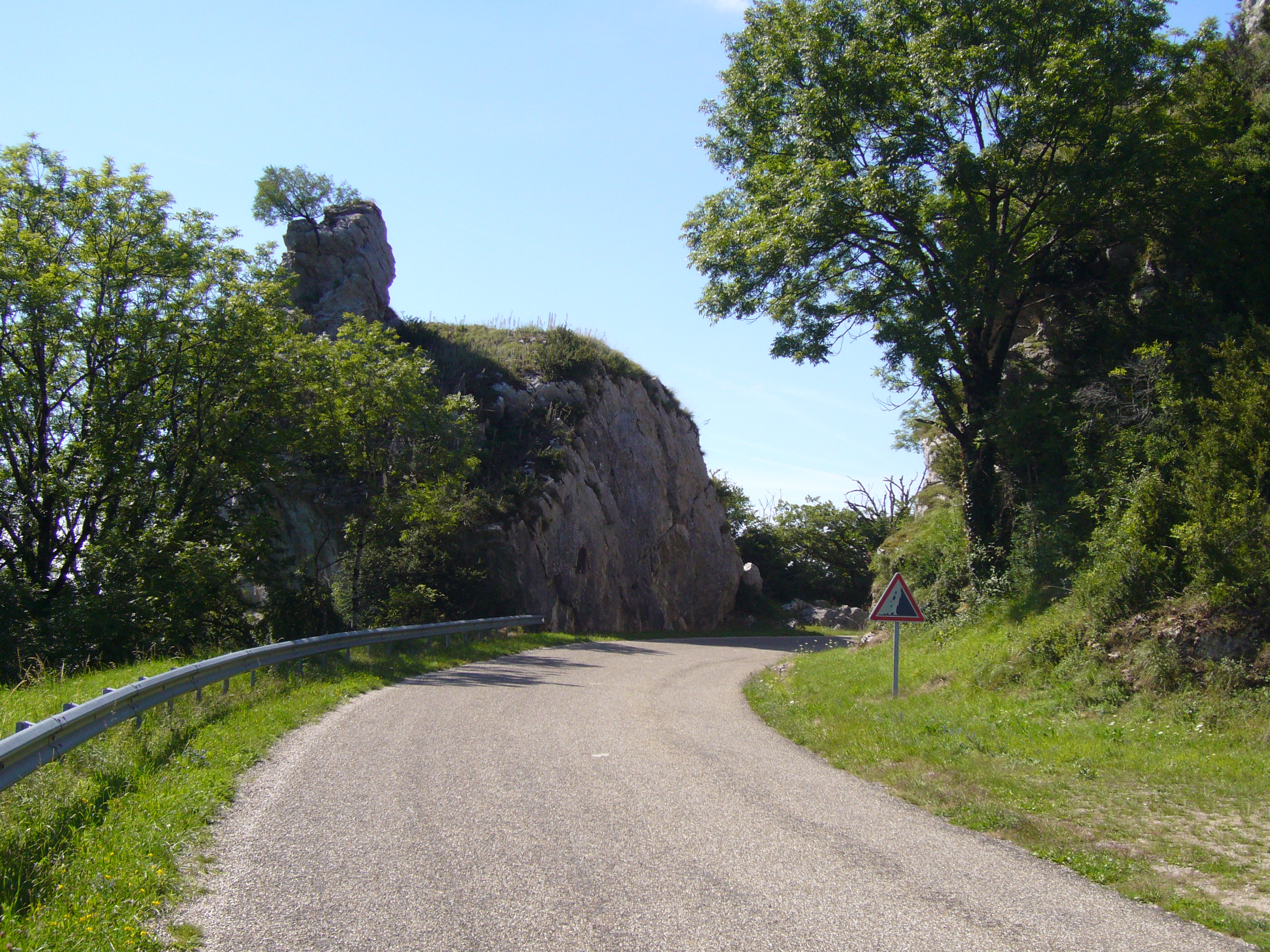
La "Roche Percée"

== See also ==
- Communes of the Jura department
