= Charles Foulkes =

Charles Foulkes may refer to:

- Charles Foulkes (British Army officer) (1875–1969), British general, adviser on gas warfare in World War I, and field hockey player
- Charles Foulkes (Canadian Army officer) (1903–1969), Canadian soldier who served in World War II
- Charles Foulkes (footballer) (1905–1986), English footballer who played for Lincoln City in the 1920s

== See also ==
- Charles ffoulkes (1868–1947), British historian
