= Jean-Pierre Travot =

French general (1767–1836)

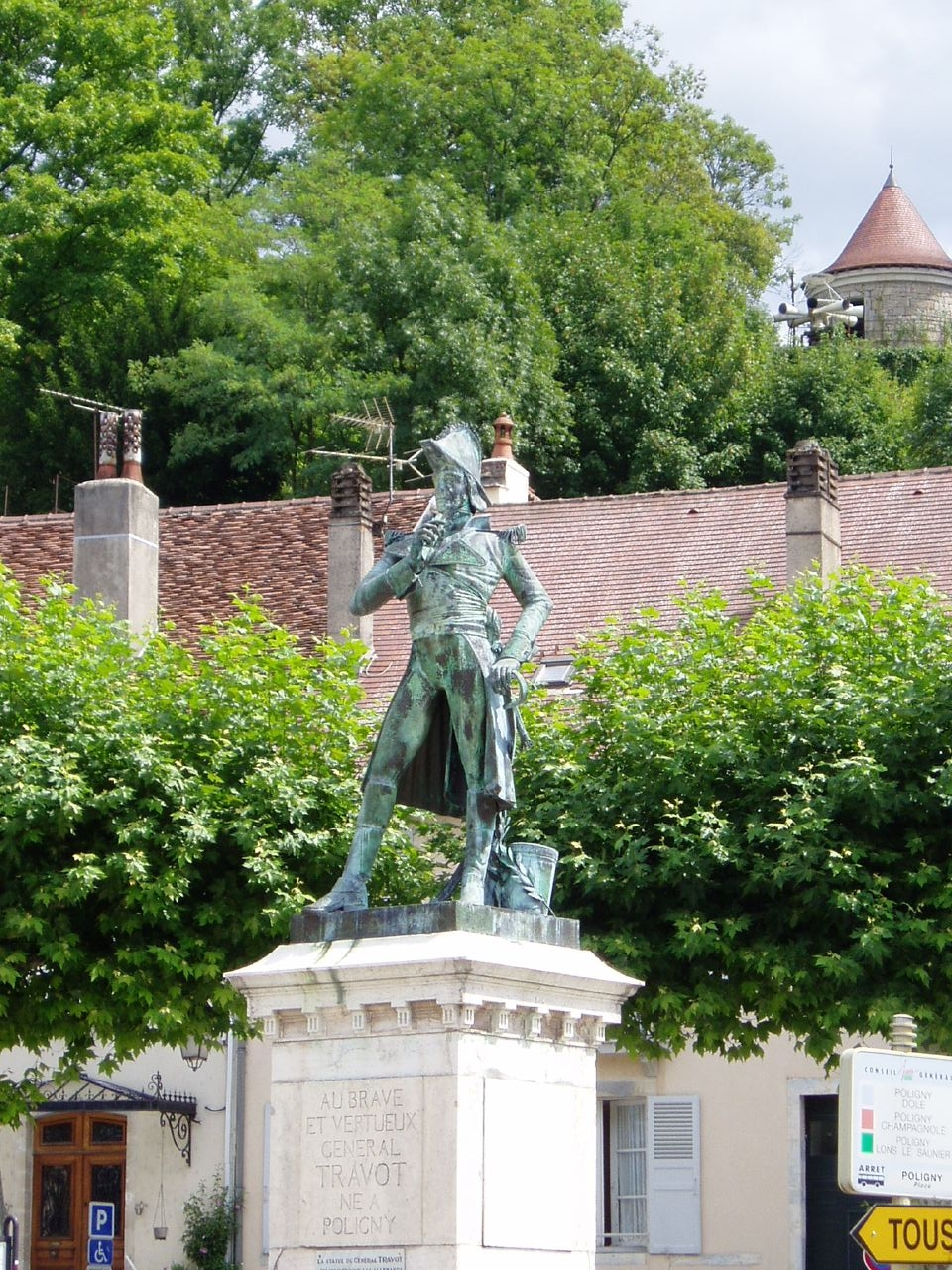
- Statue of General Travot in Poligny, Jura
- Born: 7 January 1767; Poligny, Jura
- Died: 7 January 1836 (aged 69)
- Military career
- Allegiance: First French Republic; First French Empire
- Branch: French Army
- Rank: General of Division
- Conflicts: French Revolutionary Wars; Napoleonic Wars

Jean Pierre Travot (English: /trɑːˈvoʊ/ trah-VOH, French: [ʒɑ̃ pjɛʁ tʁavo]; 7 January 1767, in Poligny, Jura – 7 January 1836) was a French general and nobleman, the son of Philibert Travot and Catherine Guodefin.

== Life ==
In 1791 Jean-Pierre Travot was already a lieutenant-colonel in the volunteers battalion of Jura. Becoming adjutant general, he fought with distinction in the War in the Vendée under general Hoche. After the defeat of Charette, a series of columns were sent to subdue the territory, with Travot receiving the command of one of them. One of his main feats in that role was his capture of Charette on 23 March 1796 at la Chabotterie, a success that led to his promotion to general. He remained in the Vendée until 1802, where the local authorities appreciated him and regretted his departure. The municipal council of Sables-d'Olonne even went as far as protesting "against his displacement" to Louis Alexandre Berthier, the Minister for War. He was admitted to the Légion d'honneur in 1803. He returned to the Vendée in 1807, when he was entrusted with the command of troops newly based in La Roche-sur-Yon, renamed Napoléon as a completely new prefecture within the department.

At the end of 1807, he led a division in the Invasion of Portugal under the command of Jean-Andoche Junot. After this expedition he exercised various territorial commands in France before returning to the Iberian Peninsula in 1812 at the head of the 2nd division of the Armée des Pyrénées. In 1813 he became a Baron of the Empire and then in 1814, during the French army's retreat from Spain, he took part in the Battle of Toulouse under Marshal Nicolas Jean-de-Dieu Soult, in which Arthur Wellesley, 1st Duke of Wellington's Anglo-Iberian force forced the French to withdraw despite a strong resistance. On Napoleon's fall general Travot remained in the army under the Bourbon Restoration, despite being a republican, but rallied to Napoleon on his return at the start of the Hundred Days. Napoleon made him a Peer of France and sent him to the Vendée to put down Royalist military uprising against him. On 16 May 1815 the English landed arms at Saint-Gilles-sur-Vie and in the following days, after a series of confrontations, Travot managed to confiscate most of them. However, it was above all Travot's victory at Rocheservière on 21 June 1815 that hampered the royalists' organisation. The campaign gained him general recognition, especially for stopping the massacres at Aiguillon.

Travot enjoyed being in the Vendée and even bought an estate in les Mauges during 1815, but he suffered after Napoleon's final defeat at Waterloo, the re-imposition of the Bourbon monarchy and the Royalist backlash in the Vendée in 1816. He came before a council of war presided over by one of his enemies, Simon Canuel, who had fought with the Republicans before switching sides to the Royalists (even joining the Vendéen insurgents Travot had been charged with beating during the Hundred Days). In these circumstances Travot's trial was hardly going to be balanced and Canuel was particularly biased, even going so far as to accuse Travot's defence counsels of lèse majesté. The trial ended in Travot being condemned to death, later commuted to 20 years in prison. Profoundly affected by his imprisonment, he went mad and died in an asylum in 1836. Travot was called "virtuous" in Napoleon's will, his name is inscribed on the Arc de Triomphe, statues were set up to him in Poligny and la Roche-sur-Yon, and a plaque was placed on his birthplace (in a street now named rue Travot after him).
