= Charles Foulkes (footballer) =

English footballer

Personal information
- Full name: Charles Edward Foulkes
- Date of birth: 7 February 1905
- Place of birth: Bilston, Staffordshire, England
- Date of death: May 1986 (aged 81)
- Position: Centre half

Senior career*
Years	Team	Apps	(Gls)
–	Fryston Colliery		
1923–1924	Bradford City	0	(0)
1924–192?	Bournemouth & Boscombe Athletic	0	(0)
1927–1930	Lincoln City	64	(1)
–	Boston Town		
- * Club domestic league appearances and goals

Charles Edward Foulkes (7 February 1905 – May 1986) was an English footballer who made 64 appearances in the Football League for Lincoln City. He played as a centre half. He was also on the books of Bradford City and Bournemouth & Boscombe Athletic without representing either in the league.
