= Fowkes hypothesis =

The Fowkes hypothesis (after F. M. Fowkes) is a first order approximation for surface energy. It states the surface energy is the sum of each component's forces:

γ=γ^{d}+γ^{p}+γ^{i}+... where γ^{d} is the dispersion component, γ^{p} is the polar, γ^{i} is the dipole and so on.

The Fowkes hypothesis goes further making the approximation that the interface between an apolar liquid and apolar solid where there are only dispersive interactions acting across the interface can be estimated using the geometric mean of the contributions from each surface i.e.

γ_{SL}=γ_{S}+γ_{L}-2(γ_{S}^{p} x γ_{L}^{p})^{1/2}

== Related articles ==
- Sessile drop technique: The Fowkes Theory
