= Jours-en-Vaux =

- Part of Val-Mont
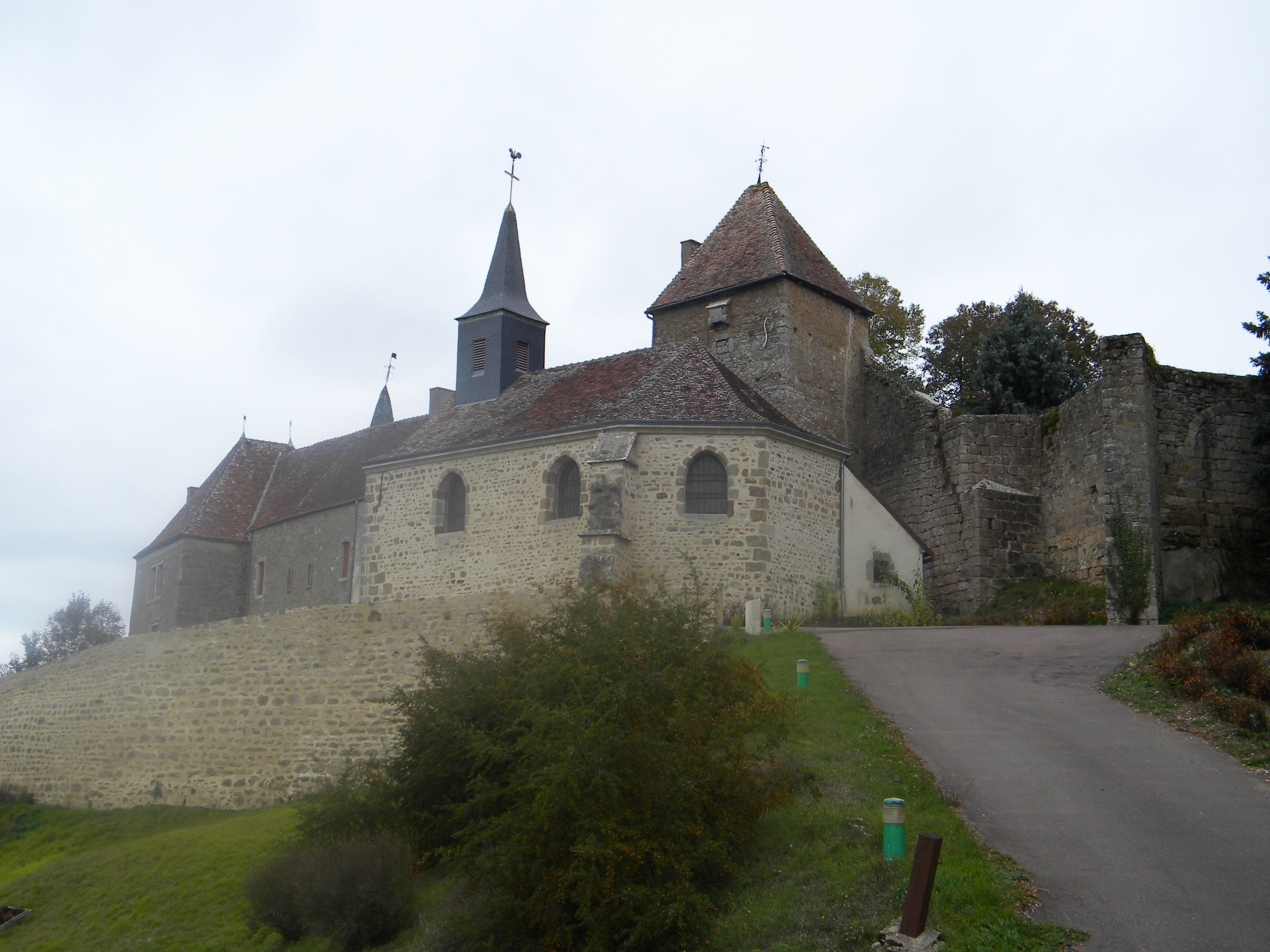
- Location of Jours-en-Vaux
- Location within France Location within Bourgogne-Franche-Comté
- Coordinates: 47°02′15″N 4°34′42″E
- Country: France
- Region: Bourgogne-Franche-Comté
- Department: Côte-d'Or
- Arrondissement: Beaune
- Canton: Arnay-le-Duc
- Commune: Val-Mont
- Area^{1}: 8.81 km^{2} (3.40 sq mi)
- Highest elevation: 476 m (1,562 ft)
- Lowest elevation: 357 m (1,171 ft)
- Population (2019): 94
  - Density: 11/km^{2} (28/sq mi)
- Time zone: UTC+01:00 (CET)
  - Summer (DST): UTC+02:00 (CEST)
- Postal code: 21340
- ^{1} French Land Register data, which excludes lakes, ponds, glaciers > 1 km^{2} (0.386 sq mi or 247 acres) and river estuaries.

Jours-en-Vaux (French pronunciation: [ʒuʁ ɑ̃ vo]) is a former commune in the Côte-d'Or department in eastern France. On 1 January 2016, it was merged into the new commune Val-Mont.

== Geography ==
Located in the Corcelle valley, Jours-en-Vaux was a rural commune in Côte-d'Or, in the Bourgogne-Franche-Comté region. The former commune of Jours-en-Vaux consisted of Jours-en-Vaux and the hamlets of Corcelles, La Chapelle and Rouvray.

== See also ==
- Communes of the Côte-d'Or department
