= Étangs de Vaux et de Baye =

Group of lakes in Nièvre, Burgundy, France

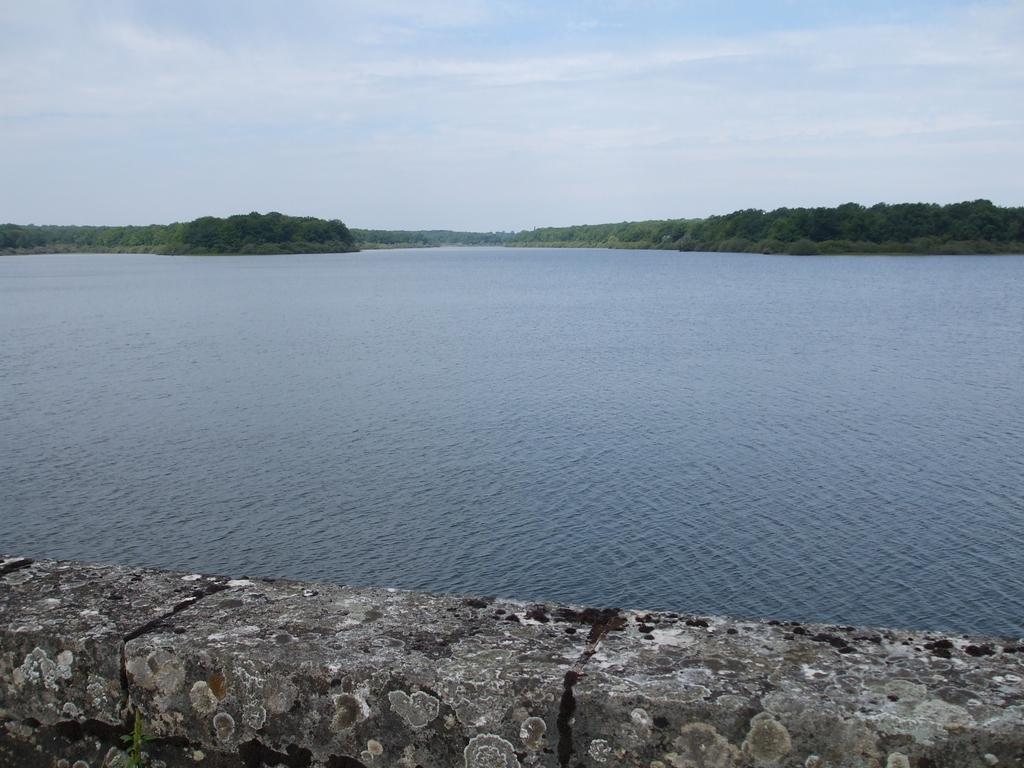

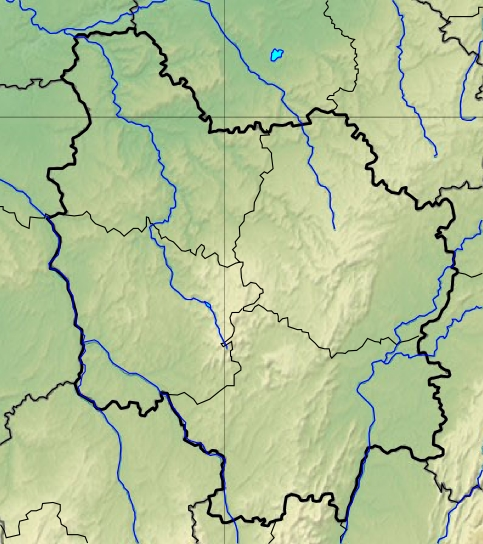
- Location within Burgundy
- Location: Nièvre, Bourgogne
- Coordinates: 47°10′51.05″N 3°36′46.03″E
- Type: artificial
- Primary outflows: Ruisseau de Venin
- Basin countries: France
- Max. length: 4 km (2.5 mi)
- Max. width: 0.7 km (0.43 mi)
- Surface area: 2.2 km^{2} (0.85 sq mi)
- Average depth: 3 m (9.8 ft)
- Max. depth: 4 m (13 ft)
- Water volume: 6,630,000 m^{3} (234,000,000 cu ft)
- Surface elevation: 235 m (771 ft)
- Sections/sub-basins: étang de Vaux, étang de Baye, étang de Perchette

Étangs de Vaux et de Baye is a group of lakes in Nièvre, Burgundy, France. At an elevation of 235 m, their surface area is 2.2 km^{2}.
