= Vaulx =

Vaulx may refer to:

== Places ==
- Vaulx, Chimay, Belgium, a district of the municipality of Chimay, Wallonia
- Vaulx, Tournai, Belgium, a district of the municipality of Tournai, Wallonia
- Vaulx, Haute-Savoie, France, a commune
- Vaulx, Pas-de-Calais, France, a commune

== People ==
- Charles de Vaulx (1961–2021), American asset manager
- Henry de La Vaulx (1870–1930), French balloonist, author and cofounder of major French and international aeronautical associations
- Vaulx Carter (1863–before 1930), American naval officer, football player and coach at the United States Naval Academy, nicknamed the ""father of Navy football"

== See also ==
- Vaulx-Milieu, Isère département, France, a commune
- Vaulx-Vraucourt, Pas-de-Calais département, France, a commune
- Vaulx-en-Velin, Rhône département, France, a commune
- Vaux (disambiguation)
