= Vaux-lès-Rubigny =

- Commune
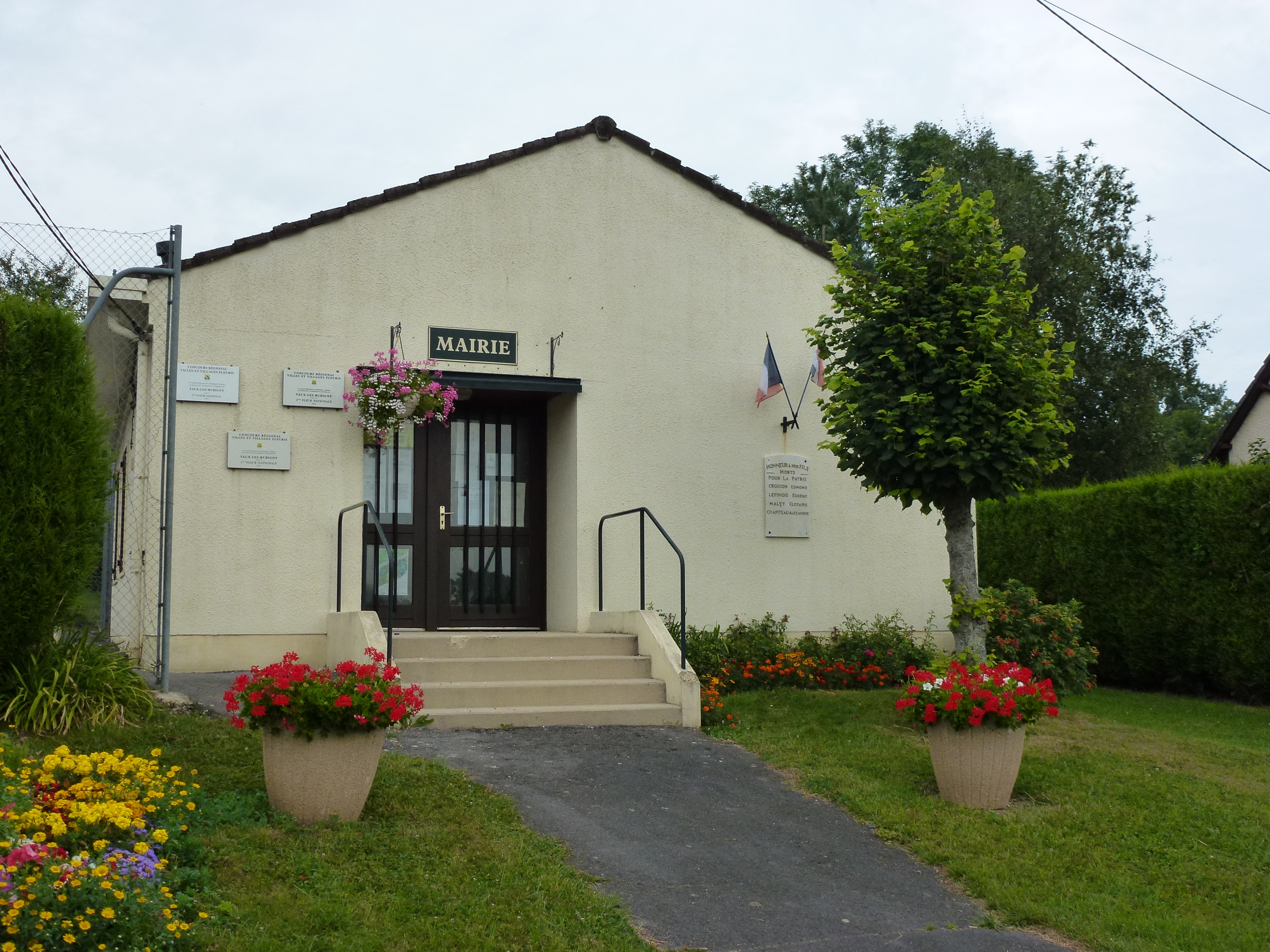
- Town hall
- Location of Vaux-lès-Rubigny
- Location within France Location within Grand Est
- Coordinates: 49°41′29″N 4°11′10″E
- Country: France
- Region: Grand Est
- Department: Ardennes
- Arrondissement: Rethel
- Canton: Signy-l'Abbaye
- Intercommunality: Crêtes Préardennaises

Government
  - Mayor (2020–2026): Marie-Véronique Racape
- Area^{1}: 3.92 km^{2} (1.51 sq mi)
- Elevation: 180 m (590 ft)
- Population (2023): 45
  - Density: 11/km^{2} (30/sq mi)
- Time zone: UTC+01:00 (CET)
  - Summer (DST): UTC+02:00 (CEST)
- INSEE/Postal code: 08465 /08220
- ^{1} French Land Register data, which excludes lakes, ponds, glaciers > 1 km^{2} (0.386 sq mi or 247 acres) and river estuaries.

Vaux-lès-Rubigny (French pronunciation: [vo lɛ ʁybiɲi], literally Vaux near Rubigny) is a commune in the Ardennes department in northern France.

== Population ==
Historical population
Year	Pop.	±% p.a.
1968	67	—
1975	45	−5.53%
1982	58	+3.69%
1990	54	−0.89%
1999	57	+0.60%
2007	49	−1.87%
2012	50	+0.40%
2017	47	−1.23%
2023	45	−0.72%
Source: INSEE

== See also ==
- Communes of the Ardennes department
