= Foulkes =

Foulkes, Ffoulkes or ffoulkes may refer to:

== People ==
- Angela Foulkes (born 1948), English-born New Zealand trade unionist
- Annie Foulkes (1877–1962), Welsh writer and teacher of French
- Bill Foulkes (1932–2013), English footballer
- Billy Foulkes (1926–1979), Welsh footballer
- Brian Foulkes (born 1957), South African cricketer
- Carly Foulkes (born 1988), Canadian model
- Charles ffoulkes (1868–1947), British historian
- Charles Foulkes (disambiguation)
- Constance Jocelyn Ffoulkes (1858–1950), British art historian
- Edmund Ffoulkes (1819–1894), British clergyman
- George Ernest Foulkes (1878–1960), American politician
- George Foulkes, Baron Foulkes of Cumnock (born 1942), Scottish politician
- Helena Foulkes (born 1963), American executive
- Isabelle Jane Foulkes (1970–2001), Anglo-Welsh artist, textile designer and disability campaigner
- John Foulkes (1861–1935), Australian politician
- Llyn Foulkes (1934–2025), American artist
- Mary Foulkes (1949–2025), American biostatistician
- Nick Foulkes (born c. 1963), British journalist
- Richard Foulkes (born 1902), English footballer
- Robert Foulkes (1634–1679), Church of England clergyman and murderer
- S. H. Foulkes (1898–1976), German-British psychiatrist and psychoanalyst

== Fictional characters ==
- Darren Foulkes, from the soap opera River City
- Tyler Foulkes, from the soap opera River City
