= Jean-Marie Eveillard =

Jean-Marie Eveillard (born 1940) is a French international investor who currently serves as the senior investment adviser to First Eagle Funds. Eveillard, who served more than a quarter century as a portfolio manager, was co-honored in 2001 by Morningstar, Inc. as "Stock Manager of the Year" and was a finalist for their 2009 "fund manager of the decade award for non-U.S. stocks". In 2003, the group gave him a "Fund Manager Lifetime Achievement" award.

== Biography ==
Eveillard was born in Poitiers in 1940 and attended the École des Hautes Études Commerciales before entering the world of finance in 1962 with a position at the Société Générale. In 1970, two years after he relocated to the United States, Eveillard took a position with SoGen International Fund as an analyst, becoming portfolio manager of the SoGen International Fund (as of 2000, First Eagle Global) in 1978 or 1979. He remained in the position, managing the First Eagle Global, Overseas, Gold, and U.S. Value Funds, until December 31, 2004, during which time he had become — according to Fortune magazine — "one of Wall Street's best value investors". In 2001, Eveillard was honored as Morningstar's International's "Stock Manager of the Year. In 2003, Morningstar bestowed on Eveillard a "Fund Manager Lifetime Achievement Award", created to recognize "mutual fund managers who throughout their careers have delivered outstanding long-term performance, aligned their interests with shareholders, demonstrated the courage to differ from consensus, and shown the ability to adapt to changes in the industry."

Eveillard transitioned to the role of Senior Adviser to First Eagle Funds in March 2009, a position he also held from January 2005 to March 2007. In 2009, Eveillard was a finalist for the Morningstar "fund manager of the decade award for non-U.S. stocks."

In addition to his role as senior adviser, Eveillard continues to be a member of First Eagle Funds' Board of Trustees and a Senior Vice President of First Eagle Investment Management, LLC. Eveillard is the William von Mueffling Professor of Professional Practice in the Finance and Economics division of Columbia Business School.
