= Vaux-le-Moncelot =

- Commune
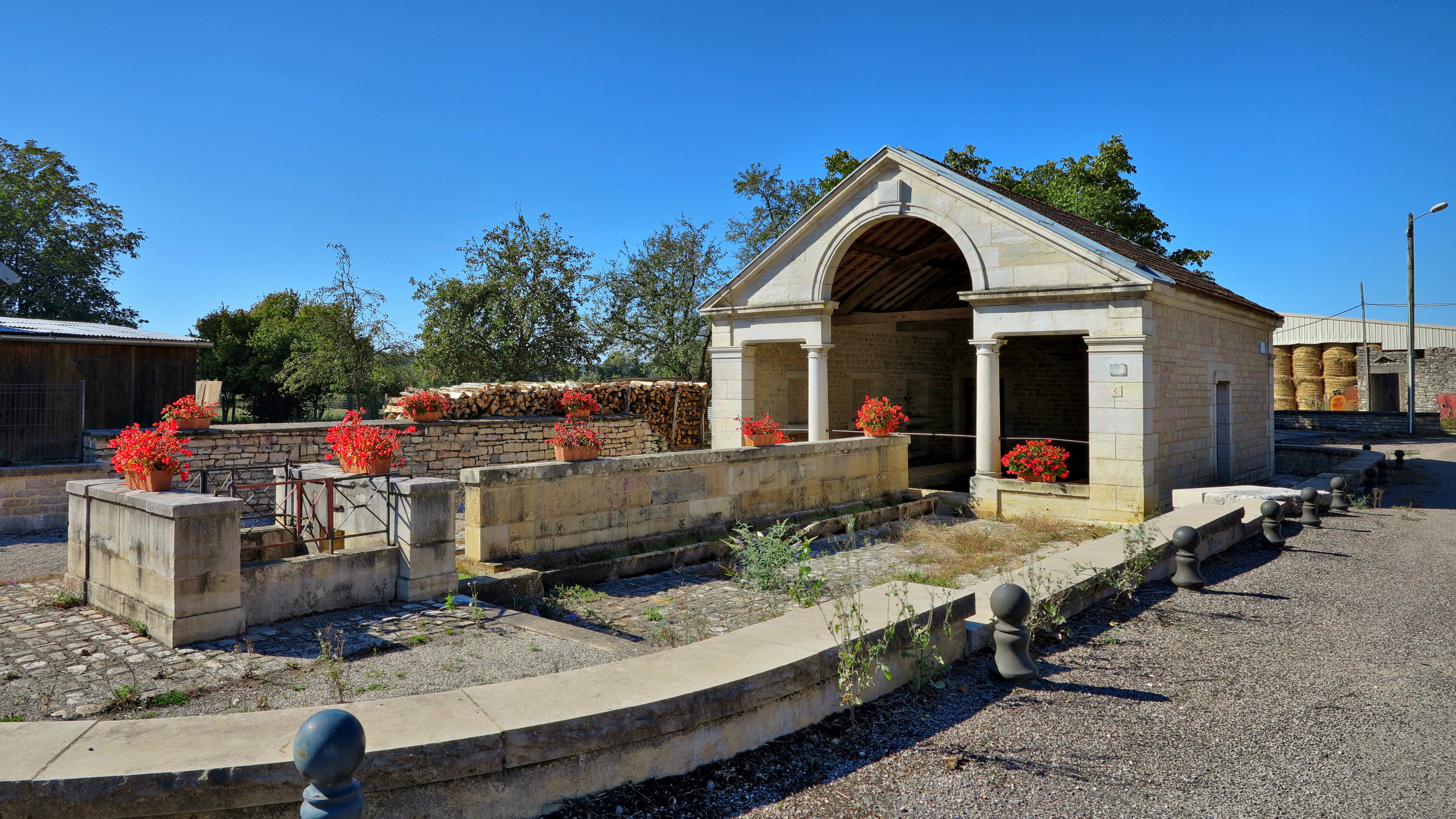
- The wash house and fountain in Vaux-le-Moncelot

- Coat of arms
- Location of Vaux-le-Moncelot
- Location within France Location within Bourgogne-Franche-Comté
- Coordinates: 47°28′24″N 5°54′08″E
- Country: France
- Region: Bourgogne-Franche-Comté
- Department: Haute-Saône
- Arrondissement: Vesoul
- Canton: Scey-sur-Saône-et-Saint-Albin
- Area^{1}: 7.04 km^{2} (2.72 sq mi)
- Highest elevation: 300 m (980 ft)
- Lowest elevation: 224 m (735 ft)
- Population (2023): 78
  - Density: 11/km^{2} (29/sq mi)
- Demonyms: Vauxlemonçois (male); Vauxlemonçoise (female)
- Time zone: UTC+01:00 (CET)
  - Summer (DST): UTC+02:00 (CEST)
- INSEE/Postal code: 70527 /70700
- ^{1} French Land Register data, which excludes lakes, ponds, glaciers > 1 km^{2} (0.386 sq mi or 247 acres) and river estuaries.

Vaux-le-Moncelot (French pronunciation: [vo lə mɔ̃slo]) is a commune in the Haute-Saône department in the region of Bourgogne-Franche-Comté in eastern France.

Its inhabitants are the Vauxlemonçois.

== Geography ==
Vaux-le-Moncelot includes a communal forest, with an area of 80 hectares, made up of 77% of pedunculate oaks, 14% of hornbeam, 7% of ash trees, less than 3% of other hardwoods and douglas. It is operated by the National Forestry Office. The town is crossed to the west by the Jouanne stream.

== Town planning ==
=== Typology ===
Vaux-le-Moncelot is a rural municipality, because it is part of the municipalities with little or very little density, within the meaning of the municipal density grid of INSEE.

In addition, the municipality is part of the attraction area of Besançon, which is a municipality in the crown. This area, which includes 310 municipalities, is categorized as areas having 200,000 to less than 700,000 inhabitants.

=== Land use ===
The zoning of the municipality, as reflected in the database European occupation biophysical soil Corine Land Cover (CLC), is marked by the importance of the agricultural land (77.3% in 2018), nevertheless down compared to 1990 (79.2%). The detailed breakdown in 2018 is as follows:

- arable land (38.7%)
- meadows (38.4%)
- forests (17.4%)
- areas with shrub and/or herbaceous vegetation (2.9%)
- areas urbanized (2.5%)
- heterogeneous agricultural areas (0.2%).

The IGN also provides an online tool to compare the evolution of land use over time in the municipality (or in territories at different scales). Several eras are accessible as aerial maps or photos: the Cassini map (18th century), the map of Staff (1820–1866) and the current period (1950 to present).

== Politics and administration ==
=== Administrative and electoral attachments ===
The town is part of the district of Vesoul in the department of Haute-Saône, in the Bourgogne-Franche-Comté region. For the election of deputies, it depends on the first constituency of Haute-Saône.

Since 1793 it was part of the canton of Gy. As part of the 2014 cantonal redistribution in France, the town is now integrated into the canton of Scey-sur-Saône-et-Saint-Albin

=== Intercommunality ===
Vaux-le-Moncelot has been a member since 2007 of the community of municipalities of Monts de Gy, a public establishment of inter-municipal cooperation (EPCI) with its own taxation created at the end of 1999 and to which the municipality has transferred a certain number of its powers, under the conditions determined by the general code of local authorities.

List of mayors
Elected in	Identity
2001	Jean-Marie Colin
2008	Claudine Narçon
2014	Roland Baulay

== Demography ==
Historical population
Year	Pop.	±% p.a.
1968	85	—
1975	74	−1.96%
1982	63	−2.27%
1990	66	+0.58%
1999	63	−0.52%
2007	77	+2.54%
2012	79	+0.51%
2017	70	−2.39%
2023	78	+1.82%
Source: INSEE

== Local culture and heritage ==
=== Places and monuments ===
Fontaine-lavoir built in 1861 to plans by the Grayl architect Christophe Colard.

=== Heraldry ===
Coat of arms	Cut Azure at the fountain of the place of silver accompanied by eight gold billets, four dextral and four sinister, ordered 2, 1 and 1, those in the middle rows in a dexter bar and in a sinister band with a of the leader and that of peak; and Or with a vaulted chevron Gules interlaced with a bent chevron reversed of the same, each charged with two ears of wheat stalked and curved Or, the rafters accompanied by three cakes Gules arranged in fess, that of the middle enclosed in the rafters.
Details	Coat of arms composed by Mr. Nicolas Vernot, adopted by the municipality on 29 July 2015.

== See also ==
- Communes of the Haute-Saône department
