= Vaux-sous-Aubigny =

- Part of Le Montsaugeonnais
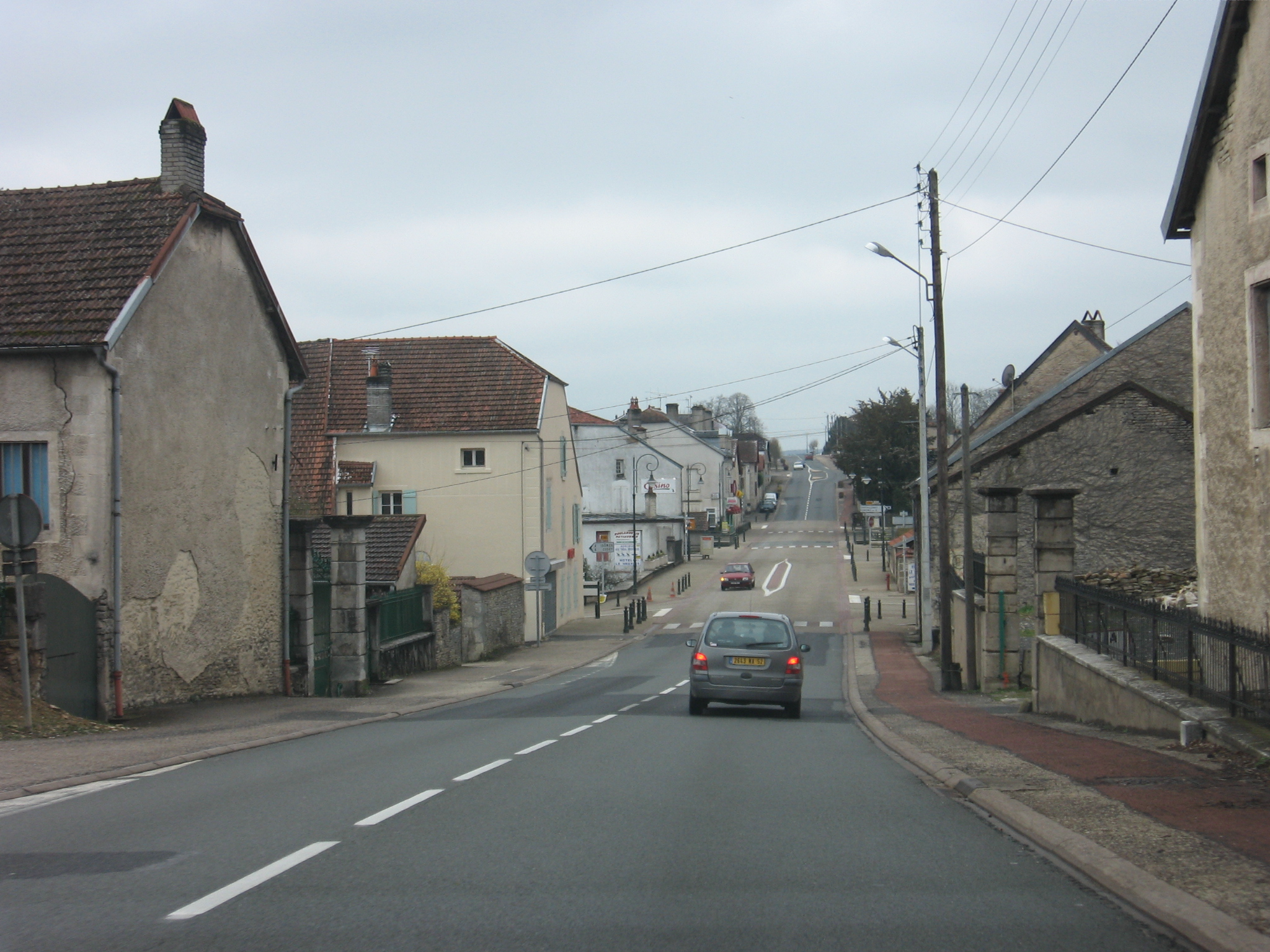
- Vaux-sous-Aubigny
- Location of Vaux-sous-Aubigny
- Location within France Location within Grand Est
- Coordinates: 47°39′30″N 5°17′18″E
- Country: France
- Region: Grand Est
- Department: Haute-Marne
- Arrondissement: Langres
- Canton: Villegusien-le-Lac
- Commune: Le Montsaugeonnais
- Area^{1}: 14.71 km^{2} (5.68 sq mi)
- Elevation: 275 m (902 ft)
- Population (2022): 677
  - Density: 46.0/km^{2} (119/sq mi)
- Demonym(s): Vauxois, Vauxoises
- Time zone: UTC+01:00 (CET)
  - Summer (DST): UTC+02:00 (CEST)
- Postal code: 52190
- ^{1} French Land Register data, which excludes lakes, ponds, glaciers > 1 km^{2} (0.386 sq mi or 247 acres) and river estuaries.

Vaux-sous-Aubigny (French pronunciation: [vo su.z‿obiɲi]) is a former commune in the Haute-Marne department in north-eastern France. In 1959, it absorbed the former commune Aubigny-sur-Badin. On 1 January 2016, it was merged into the new commune Le Montsaugeonnais. Its population was 677 in 2022. It is the natal village of beekeeper Charles Dadant.

== See also ==
- Communes of the Haute-Marne department
