= Madeleine Charlotte Fawkes =

English botanical illustrator

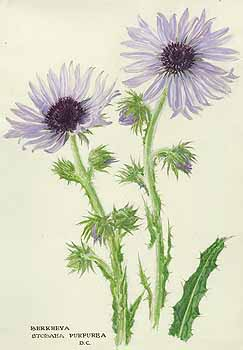
Berkheya purpurea (DC.) Benth. & Hook.f. ex Mast.

Madeleine Charlotte Fawkes ('Madge') (14 December 1880 Malta - 15 September 1954 Black Bourton) was an English botanical illustrator.

She studied at the Slade School of Fine Art. During visits to her brother Valentine Fawkes, who farmed near Ficksburg in South Africa, she painted the local flora, and was awarded the Grenfell Medal by the Royal Horticultural Society for her depictions of Lesotho wild flowers.

artist and collector; trained at the Slade School of Art, Paris, and in Cornwall. She visited her brother, Valentine Fawkes, who farmed near Ficksburg, in 1922-23, 1931-37 and in 1952, during which she painted wild flowers and took an active part in the local Horticultural Society. Some of her paintings, mainly of flower arrangements, were exhibited by the Royal Academy and, in 1939, the Grenfell Medal was awarded to her by the R.H.S. for her exhibition of paintings of Lesotho wild flowers. She also painted landscapes and portraits. She was a keen gardener and showed considerable skill in garden designing. Specimens and paintings in NBG. Ref.: letter from Mrs A. M. Tennent, Ficksburg, Aug. 1982; Codd & Gunn in Veld & Flora 68: 93-94 (1982).

— Bothalia
