= Vaux-sur-Poligny =

- Part of Poligny
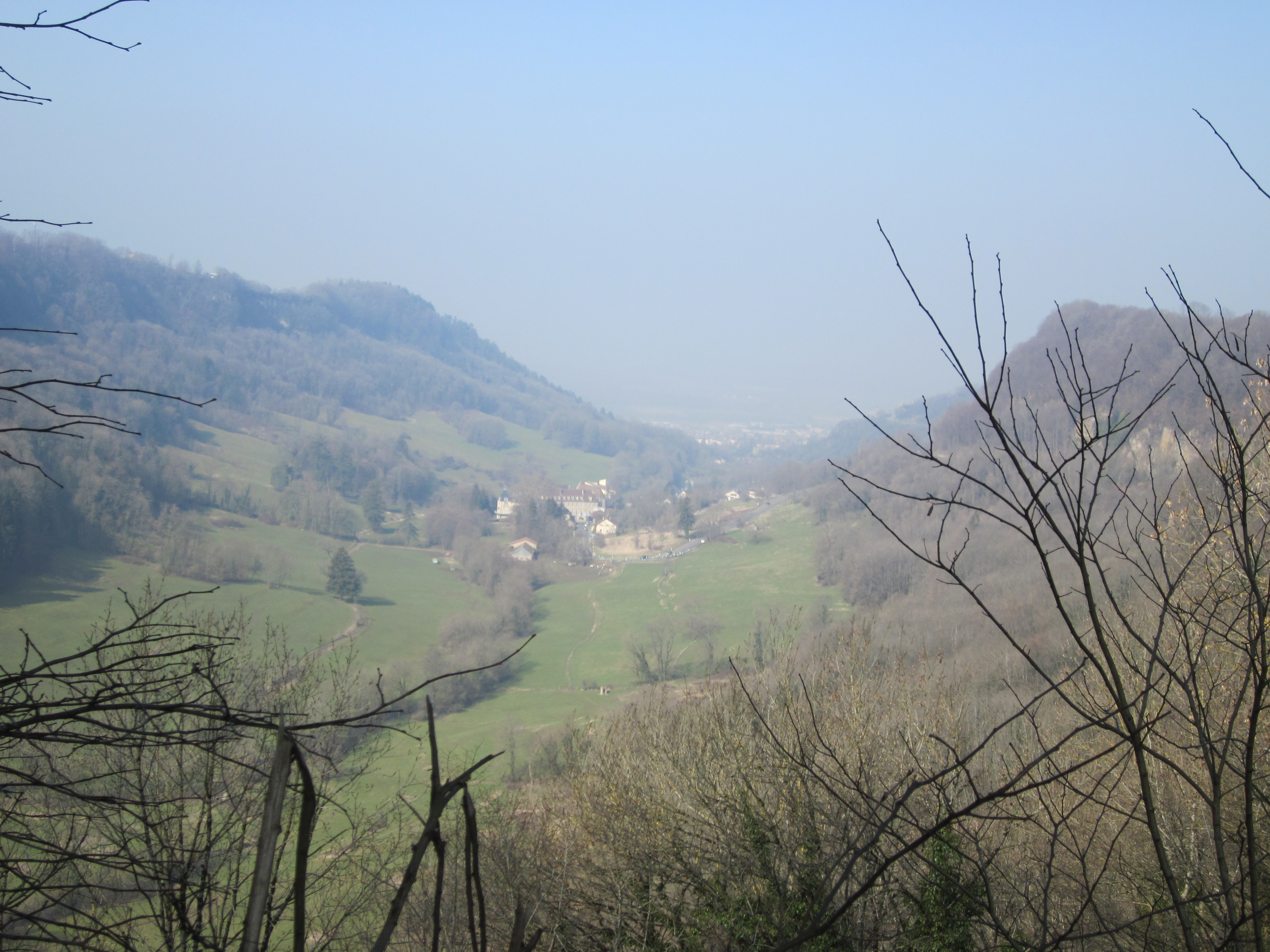
- A general view of Vaux-sur-Poligny

- Coat of arms
- Location of Vaux-sur-Poligny
- Location within France Location within Bourgogne-Franche-Comté
- Coordinates: 46°49′42″N 5°43′25″E
- Country: France
- Region: Bourgogne-Franche-Comté
- Department: Jura
- Arrondissement: Dole
- Canton: Poligny
- Commune: Poligny
- Area^{1}: 1.26 km^{2} (0.49 sq mi)
- Highest elevation: 577 m (1,893 ft)
- Lowest elevation: 377 m (1,237 ft)
- Population (2022): 82
  - Density: 65/km^{2} (170/sq mi)
- Time zone: UTC+01:00 (CET)
  - Summer (DST): UTC+02:00 (CEST)
- Postal code: 39800
- ^{1} French Land Register data, which excludes lakes, ponds, glaciers > 1 km^{2} (0.386 sq mi or 247 acres) and river estuaries.

Vaux-sur-Poligny (French pronunciation: [vo syʁ pɔliɲi], literally Vaux on Poligny) is a former commune in the Jura department in the Bourgogne-Franche-Comté region in eastern France. On 1 January 2025, it was merged into the commune of Poligny.

== Population ==
Historical population
Year	Pop.	±% p.a.
1968	118	—
1975	108	−1.26%
1982	112	+0.52%
1990	82	−3.82%
1999	112	+3.52%
2009	97	−1.43%
2014	96	−0.21%
2020	73	−4.46%
Source: INSEE

== See also ==
- Communes of the Jura department
