= List of tinclad warships of the Union Navy =

The tinclad warship was an informal class of light military steamboats used by the Union Navy during the American Civil War. Tinclads primarily consisted of converted civilian vessels, though some were purpose-built; some had formerly been in Confederate service. They lacked the heavy armor that distinguished ironclad warships but were made combat-worthy by adding lighter armament and a wooden casemate. Tinclads were cheaper, required smaller crews, and could enter shallower water than ironclads due to their light drafts. While tinclads were poorly suited to engage heavy artillery or other warships, they were better equipped to combat small groups of enemy soldiers. Tinclads were frequently used for escort and patrol duties, and sometimes provided naval support for other military actions. A total of 74 saw service during the war.

== Background ==
The tinclad Marmora

During the American Civil War, the control of the rivers of the United States of America and the Confederate States of America was strategically important. Both sides purchased civilian steamboats for conversion into warships. Both sides built ironclads, warships with heavy iron armor, and early in the war Union forces built several timberclads, vessels that used layers of wood as armor. A third type of vessel used by the Union Navy was the tinclad warship. Tinclads were generally converted civilian vessels, although several were purpose-built for the United States War Department late in the war. The process of converting a civilian steamer into a tinclad involved arming the ships (originally with either six or eight cannons, although it was eventually found advisable to add heavier cannon to the vessels), adding a casemate made of wood and at least partially covered with thin iron armor, replacing the existing pilothouse with a better-armored one, reinforcing decks and internal beams, and removing the texas.

Tinclads were cheaper than ironclads, easier to produce, and required smaller crews; their smaller drafts allowed them to enter shallower water than other warships could. Another drawback to the ironclads was that they were generally ineffective against small groups of enemy soldiers, while the tinclads were better suited to handle such threats. However, the tinclads were poorly suited for engaging heavy artillery or enemy warships. During the war, the tinclads performed patrols on the rivers, protected and escorted other vessels, and sometimes acted as naval support for military actions. Seventy-four tinclads entered service during the war.

== List of tinclads ==
Beginning on June 19, 1863, the tinclads were assigned identifying numbers, which were painted on each vessel's pilothouse.

Ship	Identifying number	Acquired	Commissioned	Summary of career	Disposition	Postwar fate
USS Alfred Robb (Note: Captured from Confederate forces)	21	April 19, or 21, 1862	June 2, 1862	Served with the Western Gunboat Flotilla and the Mississippi River Squadron. Was involved in actions at Fort Donelson, Tennessee, in February 1863; at Palmyra, Tennessee, in April 1863, and at Cerro Gordo, Tennessee, in June 1863.	Sold, August 17, 1865	Broken up, 1873
USS Little Rebel	16	June 6, 1862	August 21, 1862	Served with the Western Gunboat Flotilla, the Mississippi River Squadron, and the United States Ram Fleet. Participated in the capture of CSS Missouri in June 1865.	Sold, November 29, 1865	Ceased to appear in shipping records, 1874
USS General Pillow	20	June 9, 1862	August 23, 1862	Served on the Tennessee and Cumberland Rivers with the Western Gunboat Flotilla and the Mississippi River Squadron.	Sold, November 26, 1865	Unknown
USS Fairplay	17	August 18, 1862	September 6, 1862	Part of the Western Gunboat Flotilla. Defended Fort Donelson in February 1863, before serving on the Ohio River during Morgan's Raid in July of that year. Was present on the Cumberland River in December 1864.	Sold, August 17, 1865	Broken up, 1871
USS St. Clair	19	August 13, 1862	September 24, 1862	Served with the Mississippi River Squadron. Was engaged at Fort Donelson in February 1863, and at Palmyra, Tennessee in April 1863. In February 1864, sank another Union vessel in a collision, and took part in the Red River campaign later in 1864.	Sold, August 17, 1865	Ceased to appear in shipping records, 1869
USS Brilliant	18	August 13, 1862	October 1, 1862	Served with the Mississippi River Squadron in 1862. In February 1863, she was engaged at Fort Donelson in Tennessee, and in April 1863 burned Palmyra, Tennessee. In December 1864, she was involved in the Nashville campaign.	Sold, August 17, 1865	Burned, December 6, 1867
USS Marmora	2	September 17, 1862	October 21, 1862	Served with the Mississippi River Squadron. Was on the Yazoo River in November and December 1862, and was involved in the campaign related to the Battle of Arkansas Post in January 1863. In March 1863, was part of the Yazoo Pass Expedition, and served on the White and Little Red Rivers in August 1863. In early 1864, took part in a campaign on the Yazoo River.	Sold, August 17, 1865	Unknown
USS Signal	8	September 22, 1862	October 1862	Served with the Mississippi River Squadron. Was on the Yazoo River in December 1862, and took part in the campaign related to the Battle of Arkansas Post in January 1863. In March 1863 participated in the Yazoo Pass expedition, and was involved in the Battle of Snyder's Bluff in April and May of that year. Advanced up the Yazoo River in May 1863, and two months later destroyed Confederate ships at Yazoo City, Mississippi. Took part in the Red River campaign in 1864.	Burned to prevent capture after battle damage, May 5, 1864	N/A
USS Forest Rose	9	November 15, 1862	December 3, 1862	Served with the Mississippi River Squadron. Bombarded Drumgold's Bluff in December 1862, and in January 1863 was involved in the Battle of Arkansas Post. Participated in the Yazoo Pass Expedition in March 1863. In May 1863 served on the Yazoo River, and destroyed Confederate naval facilities at Yazoo City, Mississippi. Served on the Red River in July 1863, and took part in the Red River campaign in early 1864.	Sold, August 17, 1865	Destroyed by ice, February 4, 1868
USS Glide I	None	November 17, 1862	December 3, 1862	Served with the Mississippi River Squadron. Was involved in the Battle of Arkansas Post and an expedition up the White River in January 1863.	Burned in accident, February 7, 1863	N/A
USS Romeo	3	October 31, 1862	December 11, 1862	Served with the Mississippi River Squadron. Was on the Yazoo River in December 1862, and participated in the Battle of Arkansas Post in January 1863. In March 1863, was part of the Yazoo Pass Expedition, and took part in the Battle of Snyder's Bluff in April and May 1863. Served on the Yazoo River in early 1864.	Sold, August 17, 1865	Ceased to appear in shipping records, 1870
USS Juliet	4	November 1, 1862	December 14, 1862	Served with the Mississippi River Squadron. In December 1862, removed naval mines on the Yazoo River. In January 1863, was involved in the Battle of Arkansas Post, and in early 1864 was part of the Red River campaign.	Sold, August 17, 1865	Wrecked, December 31, 1865
USS New Era	7	October 27, 1862	December 1862	Served with the Mississippi River Squadron. Was involved with the Battle of Arkansas Post in January 1863 and the Battle of Fort Pillow in April 1864.	Sold, August 17, 1865	Burned, June 3, 1868
USS Rattler	1	November 11, 1862	December 19, 1862	Served with the Mississippi River Squadron. Was involved in the campaign related to the Battle of Arkansas Post in January 1863, and in the Yazoo Pass Expedition the following March. In July 1863, she served on the Red, Tensas, and Ouachita Rivers.	Wrecked, December 30, 1864	N/A
USS Silver Lake	23	November 15, 1862	December 24, 1862	Served with the Mississippi River Squadron. Was engaged at Fort Donelson in February 1863, and bombarded the towns of Florence, Alabama, and Palmyra, Tennessee, in late March and early April 1863. Was engaged on the Cumberland river in December 1864.	Sold, August 17, 1865	Burned, February 28, 1866
USS Linden	10	November 20, 1862	January 3, 1863	Served with the Mississippi River Squadron. In April and May 1863, participated in the Battle of Snyder's Bluff, and served on the Yazoo River in May 1863.	Wrecked, February 22, 1864	N/A
USS Springfield	22	November 20, 1862	January 12, 1863	Served with the Mississippi River Squadron. Burned Palmyra, Tennessee, in April 1863, and served on the Ohio River during Morgan's Raid in July 1863.	Sold, August 17, 1865	Ceased to appear in shipping records, 1875
USS Cricket	6	November 18, 1862	January 19, 1863	Was engaged in a skirmish near Greenville, Mississippi, in May 1863, and served on the White River in August of that year. Served on the Ouachita River in early March 1864, before participating in the Red River campaign, during which she was damaged.	Sold, August 17, 1865	Broken up, 1867
USS Prairie Bird	11	December 19, 1862	January 1863	Served with the Mississippi River Squadron. Participated in destruction of Eunice, Arkansas, in June 1863, was served on the Yazoo River in April 1864. Damaged in a skirmish at Gaines Landing, Arkansas, in August 1864.	Sold, August 17, 1865	Unknown
USS Curlew	12	December 17, 1862	February 16, 1863	Served on the Red, Tensas, and Ouachita Rivers in July 1863, and in May of the next year, skirmished with a shore battery at Gaines Landing, Arkansas.	Sold, August 17, 1865	Unknown
USS Covington	25	February 13, 1863	March 1863	Served on the Tennessee River in 1863 and in the Red River campaign the next year.	Burned after battle damage on Red River of the South, May 5, 1864	N/A
USS Argosy	27	March 24, 1863	March 29, 1863	Served with the Mississippi River Squadron.	Sold, August 17, 1865	Burned, March 7, 1872
USS Hastings	15	March 24, 1863	April 1863	Served on the Tennessee River and later the White River.	Sold, August 17, 1865	Ceased to appear in shipping records, 1872
USS Petrel	5	December 22, 1862	1863	Served with the Mississippi River Squadron. Participated in the Battle of Snyder's Bluff in April and May 1863, and then served on the Yazoo River in the latter month. Served on the Red River in July 1863, and was on the Yazoo River in early 1864.	Captured by Confederate forces on April 22, 1864, and later scuttled	N/A
USS Fort Hindman	13	March 14, 1863	April 1863	Served on the Red River of the South, Tensas River, Ouachita River, and Little Red River in 1863. In 1864 she served on the Ouachita and Red Rivers and was part of the Red River campaign.	Sold, August 17, 1865	Ceased to appear in shipping records, 1874
USS Queen City	26	February 13, 1863	April 1, 1863	Served in the regions of Helena, Arkansas, and Clarendon, Arkansas, as well as the Tennessee River.	Captured by Confederate forces on June 24, 1864, and scuttled at a later date.	N/A
USS Naumkeag	37	April 14, 1863	April 16, 1863	Served with the Mississippi River Squadron. Was on the Ohio River in July 1863, including during Morgan's Raid. Fought in a skirmish at Clarendon, Arkansas, in June 1864.	Sold, August 17, 1865	Burned, January 19, 1867
USS Champion	24	March 14, 1863	April 26, 1863	Served with the Mississippi River Squadron.	Sold, November 29, 1865	Ceased to appear in shipping records, 1868
USS Silver Cloud	28	April 1, 1863	May 4, 1863	Served with the Mississippi River Squadron. Was part of a movement towards Eastport, Mississippi in May 1863. During April of the next year, she was involved in the Battle of Fort Pillow, and in December 1864 was engaged on the Cumberland river.	Sold, August 15, 1865	Wrecked, October 2, 1866 or 1868
USS Fawn	30	May 13, 1863	May 11, 1863	Served on the White River, including in an action against a shore battery at Clarendon, Arkansas, in June 1864.	Sold, August 17, 1865	Wrecked, March 24, 1873
USS Kenwood	14	April 3, 1863	May 24, 1863	Served with the Mississippi River Squadron, sometimes on the Arkansas River. Was involved in an expedition to Yazoo City, Mississippi, in July 1863, and from 1863 to 1865, served in the Port Hudson, Louisiana, area. Participated in the capture of CSS Missouri in June 1865.	Sold, August 17, 1865	Exploded, August 14, 1868 or 1869
USS Key West	32	April 16, or May 16, 1863	May 26, 1863	Served with the Mississippi River Squadron, especially on the Tennessee River. Was involved in an expedition to Eastport, Mississippi, in October 1864, and was present at the Battle of Johnsonville the next month.	Burned to prevent capture, November 4, 1864	N/A
USS Exchange	38	April 6, 1863	June 1863	Served on the Tennessee River in 1863. Was part of an expedition on the Yazoo River in early 1864, and was damaged in at skirmish at Columbia, Arkansas, in June 1864.	Sold, August 17, 1865	Wrecked, April 25, 1869
USS Moose	34	May 20, 1863	June 15, 1863	Served with the Mississippi River Squadron. Was on the Ohio River in July 1863, including during Morgan's Raid. Fought at the Battle of Fort Pillow in April 1864, skirmished against Confederate forces on the Cumberland River in December 1864, and in a fight at Centre Furnace, Tennessee, in April 1865.	Sold, August 17, 1865	Burned, December 29, 1867
USS Tawah	29	June 19, 1863	June 21, or October 1863	Served on the Tennessee River, including in the Battle of Johnsonville.	Burned after battle damage, November 4, 1864	N/A
USS Victory	33	May 1863 (Note: The purchase of Victory was not formalized until after she was commissioned.)	July 8, 1863	Served with the Mississippi River Squadron. In July 1863, she served on the Ohio River during Morgan's Raid, and in November 1864 participated in a skirmish at Paducah, Kentucky.	Sold, August 17, 1865	Wrecked, February 8, 1866
USS Reindeer	35	May 25, or June 13, 1863	July 25, 1863	Served with the Mississippi River Squadron. Was on the Ohio River during July 1863, including during Morgan's Raid. Served on the Cumberland River in December 1864 and was a dispatch vessel in 1865.	Sold, August 17, 1865	Wrecked, May 9, 1867
USS Paw Paw	31	April 9, 1863	July 25, 1863	Served with the Mississippi River Squadron. Sank after hitting a snag in August 1863, but was later refloated. Acted in support of Union Army operations on the Tennessee River from October to December 1863, and in March of the following year took part in a skirmish at Paducah, Kentucky.	Sold, August 17, 1865	Broken up, 1865
USS Peosta	36	June 13, 1863	October 2, 1863	Served on the Tennessee River, including in an action at Paducah, Kentucky, in March 1864.	Sold, August 17, 1865	Burned, December 15, or 25, 1870
USS Wave	45	November 14, 1863	Unknown	Served with the West Gulf Blockading Squadron.	Captured by Confederate forces on May 6, 1864; further fate uncertain but probably scuttled by Confederate troops	N/A
USS Glide II	43	November 30, 1863	Unknown	Served with the West Gulf Blockading Squadron, particularly at Berwick Bay.	Sold, August 12, 1865	Exploded, January 13, 1869
USS Stockdale	42	November 13, 1863	December 26, 1863	Served with the West Gulf Blockading Squadron. Fought a minor action on the Tchefuncte River in May 1864, and was present at the Battle of Mobile Bay in August. In September 1864 was part of an expedition to the Bon Secour River.	Sold, August 24, 1865	Ceased to appear in shipping records, 1871
USS Nyanza	41	November 4, 1863	December 21, 1863	Served with the Mississippi River Squadron.	Sold, August 15, 1865	Ceased to appear in shipping records, 1873
USS Alexandria	40	July 13, 1863	December 12, 1863	Served with the Mississippi River Squadron.	Sold, August 17, 1865	Wrecked, October 5, 1867
USS Tensas	39	August 14, 1863	January 1, 1864	Served with the Mississippi River Squadron.	Sold, August 17, 1865	Wrecked, 1868
USS Gazelle	50	November 21, 1863	February 1864	Served in the Red River campaign.	Sold, August 17, 1865	Broken up, 1869
USS Elfin	52	February 23, 1864	March 1864	Served with the Mississippi River Squadron and fought at the Battle of Johnsonville.	Burned to prevent capture, November 4, 1864	N/A
USS Fairy	51	February 10, 1864	March 10, 1864	Served with the Mississippi River Squadron, including on the Tennessee River.	Sold, August 17, 1865	Unknown
USS Undine	55	March 7, 1864	April 1864	Served with the Mississippi River Squadron. Almost sank in July 1864 on the Tennessee River, and was part of a movement to Eastport, Mississippi, in October 1864. Took part in an engagement at Paris Landing, Tennessee, in October 1864, in which she was captured.	Captured by Confederate forces on October 30, 1864, and burned on November 4, 1864	N/A
USS Meteor	44	November or December 1863 (Note: The acquisition of Meteor was not formalized until January 23, 1864.)	March 8, 1864	Served with the West Gulf Blockading Squadron. Guarded the Head of Passes from March 1864 to February 1865. In March and April 1865, served in the Mobile, Alabama, area.	Sold, October 5, 1865	Ceased to appear in shipping records, 1869
USS Tallahatchie	46	January 23, 1864	April 19, 1864	Initially served with the Mississippi River Squadron. Participated with the Red River expedition in early 1864, before transferring to the West Gulf Blockading Squadron in June 1864.	Sold, August 12, 1865	Burned, September 7, 1869
USS Naiad	53	March 3, 1864	April 3, 1864	Served with the Mississippi River Squadron. Skirmished with Confederate batteries at multiple points in Louisiana in 1864.	Sold, August 17, 1865	Wrecked, June 1, 1868
USS Nymph	54	March 8, 1864	April 11, 1864	Served with the Mississippi River Squadron.	Sold, August 17, 1865	Unknown
USS Carrabasset	49	January 23, 1864	May 12, 1864	Served in the West Gulf Blockading Squadron, and participated in an expedition to Berwick Bay in March 1865.	Sold, August 12, 1865	Wrecked, May 1, 1870
USS Elk	47	December 8, 1863	May 6, 1864	Served with the West Gulf Blockading Squadron in 1863, and later on the Lower Mississippi River in 1864 and 1865, including an expedition to Lake Pontchartrain in October 1864.	Sold, August 24, 1865	Wrecked, 1868
USS Rodolph	48	December 31, 1863	May 18, 1864	Served with the West Gulf Blockading Squadron, including actions at Mobile Bay in August 1864, Bon Secour, Alabama, in September 1864, and the Blakely River in April 1865.	Sunk by naval mine, April 1, 1865	N/A
USS Huntress	58	May 1864	June 10, 1864	Served in the Mississippi River Squadron, patrolling between Memphis, Tennessee, and Columbus, Kentucky.	Sold, August 17, 1865	Wrecked, December 30, 1865
USS Peri	57	April 30, 1864	June 20, 1864	Served on the White River in July 1864.	Sold, August 17, 1865	Wrecked, January 8, 1868
USS Sibyl	59	April 27, 1864	June 16, or 26, 1864	Served as a dispatch boat with the Mississippi River Squadron.	Sold, August 17, 1865	Ceased to appear in shipping records, 1876
USS General Grant	62	1864	July 20, 1864	Served on the Tennessee River, including an action at Decatur, Alabama, in December 1864. Destroyed Guntersville, Alabama, in January 1865.	Returned to United States War Department, June 2, 1865	Unknown
USS General Sherman	60	1864	July 27, 1864	Served on the Tennessee River, including an action at Decatur, Alabama, in December 1864.	Returned to United States War Department, June 3, 1865	Unknown
USS General Burnside	63	1864	August 8, 1864	Served on the Tennessee River, including an action at Decatur, Alabama, in December 1864.	Returned to United States War Department, June 1, 1865	Unknown
USS General Thomas	61	1864	August 8, 1864	Served on the Tennessee River, participating in fighting at Whitesburg, Tennessee, in October 1864, and Decatur, Alabama, in December 1864.	Returned to United States War Department, June 3, 1865 and sold in 1866	Wrecked, December 31, 1868
USS Siren	56	March 11, 1864	August 30, 1864	Was a receiving ship at Mound City, Illinois, from March to August 1864, and then joined the Mississippi River Squadron.	Sold, August 17, 1865	Ceased to appear in shipping records, 1867
USS Grosbeak	8	December 3, 1864 or February 3, 1865	February 24, 1865	Served with the Mississippi River Squadron. Rescued survivors of the Sultana Disaster.	Sold, August 17, 1865	Wrecked, June 9, 1871
USS Colossus	25	December 6, or December 8, 1864	February 24, 1865	Served with the Mississippi River Squadron.	Sold, August 17, 1865	Wrecked, December 17, 1866
USS Mist	26	December 23, 1864	March 3, 1865	Served with the Mississippi River Squadron.	Sold, August 17, 1865	Ceased to appear in shipping records, 1874
USS Collier	29	December 7, 1864	March 18, 1865	Served with the Mississippi River Squadron. In June 1865, she participated in the capture of CSS Missouri.	Sold, August 17, 1865	Ceased to appear in shipping records, 1867
USS Oriole	52	December 7, 1864	March 22, 1865	Served with the Mississippi River Squadron.	Sold, August 17, 1865	Wrecked, March 3, 1869
USS Gamage	60	December 22, 1864	March 23, 1865	Served with the Mississippi River Squadron. Participated in the capture of CSS Missouri in June 1865.	Sold, August 17, 1865	Burned, October 11, 1876
USS Kate	55	December 23, 1864	April 2, 1865	Served with the Mississippi River Squadron.	Sold, March 29, 1866	Wrecked, June 21, 1867
USS Ibex	10	December 10, 1864	April 4, 1865	Served with the Mississippi River Squadron.	Sold, August 17, 1865	Exploded, January 3, 1868
USS Abeona	32	December 21, 1864	April 10, 1865	Served as a patrol and guard vessel with the Mississippi River Squadron	Sold, August 17, 1865	Burned, March 7, 1872
USS Tempest	1	December 30, 1864	April 26, 1865	Served on the western rivers and was the flagship for Samuel P. Lee through the demobilization of the Mississippi River Squadron.	Sold, November 29, 1865	Burned, December 27, 1869

== Sources ==
- Gudmestad, Robert (2021). "Elusive Victory: The Union Navy's War along the Western Waters". Civil War History. 67 (2): 79–109. doi:10.1353/cwh.2021.0016. S2CID 234772175.
- Palucka, Tim (2017). "Timberclads, Tinclads, and Cottonclads in the US Civil War". MRS Bulletin. 42 (1): 73. Bibcode:2017MRSBu..42...73P. doi:10.1557/mrs.2016.317. ISSN 1938-1425.
- Silverstone, Paul H. (1989). Warships of the Civil War Navies. Annapolis, Maryland: Naval Institute Press. ISBN 0-87021-783-6.
- Smith, Myron J. (2010). Tinclads in the Civil War: Union Light-Draught Gunboat Operations on Western Waters, 1862–1865. Jefferson, North Carolina: McFarland & Company. ISBN 978-0-7864-3579-1.
- Smith, Myron J. (2021). After Vicksburg: The Civil War on Western Waters, 1863–1865. Jefferson, North Carolina: McFarland & Company. ISBN 978-1-4766-4370-0.
