= USS Romeo =

1862 American steamship

History

United States
- Completed: August 1862
- Acquired: October 31, 1862
- Commissioned: December 11, 1862
- Decommissioned: June 30, 1865
- Fate: Sold, August 17, 1865

General characteristics
- Type: Sternwheel steamer
- Tonnage: 175 tons
- Length: 154 ft 2 in (47.0 m)
- Beam: 31 ft 2 in (9.50 m)
- Draft: 4 ft 6 in (1.37 m)
- Propulsion: 2 × steam engines
- Armament: 6 × 24-pounder howitzers

USS Romeo was a sternwheel steamer that saw service as a tinclad warship during the American Civil War. Completed in August 1862 as a civilian vessel to be used for trade on the Wabash River, she was instead purchased by the Union Navy for military service in the war's western theater in October. Commissioned in December, she cleared naval mines from the Yazoo River later that month before participating in operations against Confederate-held Fort Hindman in January 1863. After the fall of Fort Hindman, Romeo joined an expedition up the White River. In February and March 1863, she was part of the Yazoo Pass expedition, and later that year she fought Confederates at river landings to help isolate Vicksburg, Mississippi, during the Vicksburg campaign.

Later in 1863, Romeo served on the White River for part of the Little Rock campaign, but was in poor condition and required repairs. After these repairs, the vessel was transferred to the Tennessee River. During February 1864, she was part of an expedition up the Yazoo River to Yazoo City, Mississippi. She spent most of the rest of the war patrolling the Mississippi River, encountering Confederate land forces on several occasions. With the war drawing to a close in April and May 1865, Romeo was declared surplus on May 29. Decommissioned on June 30, she was sold on August 17 and was then used in the merchant trade. At some point in her civilian career, she was converted into a sidewheel steamer. Romeo ceased to appear in the shipping registers in 1870.

== Construction and characteristics ==
In mid-1862, with the Civil War ongoing, the Union Navy authorized Commodore Joseph B. Hull to purchase civilian vessels for conversion into warships. Some of these civilian ships were converted into tinclad warships, a process that involved removing the pilothouse and usually removing the texas (a structure used for crew housing not found on all steamboats). A wooden casemate (Note: A casemate in a naval context is an armored structure from within which cannons can be fired through openings.) was then added to the vessel, along with a new armored pilothouse. The ships were also partially covered with thin metal armor, certain internal structures were reinforced, and cannons were added as armament. The vessels were not actually armored with tin; rather it was a term used to distinguish the lighter-armored tinclads (Note: The word "tin" is here used in its sense as meaning "made of thin, flimsy metal".) from the more heavily armored ironclad warships. One of the vessels purchased by Hull was Romeo, which was bought at Cincinnati, Ohio, on October 31, 1862, at a cost of $17,459 (equivalent to $563,000 in 2025). Romeo had been completed in August at Brownsville, Pennsylvania, for John Rhoades, who was also the owner of the vessel that became USS Juliet. Romeo had been earmarked for trade use on the Wabash River when she was built. The process of preparing her for military service took place at Cairo, Illinois.

Romeo was 154 feet 2 inches (47.0 m) long, with a beam of 31 feet 2 inches (9.50 m), and a draft of 4 feet 6 inches (1.37 m). Her depth of hold was 4 feet (1.2 m), and her tonnage was 175 tons. A sternwheel steamer, power was provided by two steam engines fed by two boilers. The engines had a cylinder diameter of 1 foot (0.3 m) and a stroke of 4 feet (1.2 m). Romeo was reported to have a maximum speed of 5 miles per hour (8 km/h; 4 kn) when going upstream. Originally armed with six 24-pounder Dahlgren howitzers, by July 1864 she had two more 24-pounders, but by the end of September was back down to six.

== Service history ==
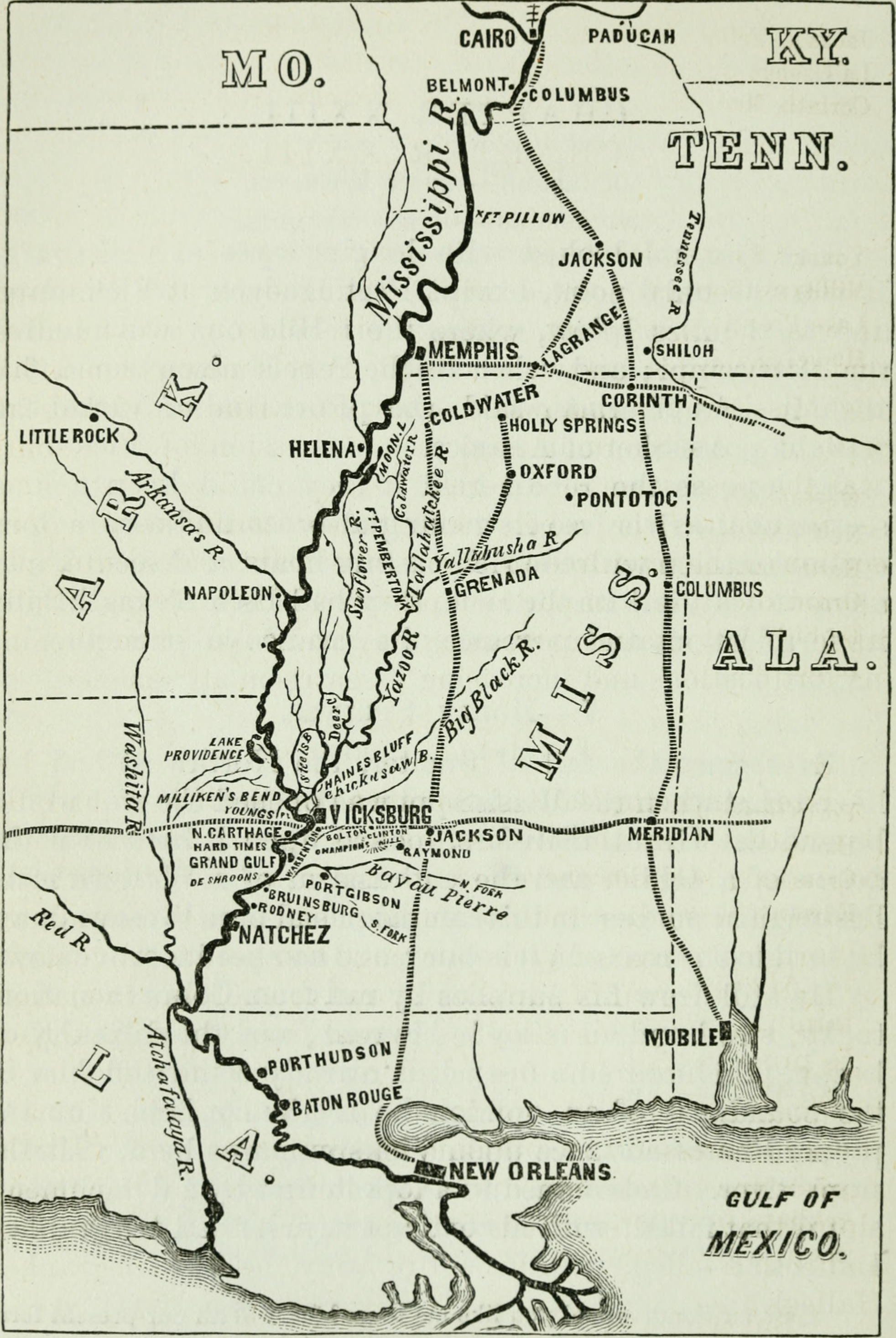
A map of the lower Mississippi Valley with geographic locations associated with the American Civil War

=== Fort Hindman ===
Romeo was commissioned on December 11, 1862, and was placed under the command of Acting Ensign Robert B. Smith. She soon (Note: The Dictionary of American Naval Fighting Ships (DANFS) states that Romeo left for Helena on December 12, but the historian Ed Bearss contends that Romeo was part of the group of warships that accompanied David Dixon Porter downriver from Cairo beginning on December 14.) moved downriver to Helena, Arkansas, to join the Mississippi River Squadron. On December 21, she left Helena, and then moved up the Yazoo River as part of a group of warships led by Lieutenant Commander William Gwin. This was in support of a Union Army attempt to capture Confederate-held Vicksburg, Mississippi. From December 23 until December 26, Romeo cleared naval mines from the Yazoo River. On December 29, 1862, Romeo joined the tinclad USS Marmora in moving up Old River (Note: Old River was a lake formed when the Mississippi River changed course; it was connected to the Yazoo River.) to shell Confederate positions near Vicksburg. The Union Army's campaign failed, leading to the vessels up the Yazoo River, including Romeo, being withdrawn to the mouth of the river on January 2. On January 4, almost all of the Union vessels that had been supporting the Yazoo River expedition moved upriver, as part of Union operations against Confederate Fort Hindman in Arkansas. For this campaign, Romeo was assigned to a naval force commanded by Lieutenant Commander Watson Smith.

After moving to the mouth of the White River, the Union flotilla, accompanied by troop transports, steamed up the White, and then took a cutoff into the Arkansas River. On January 9, army forces began to land for operations against the fort. Following fighting on January 10, the fort fell to an assault on January 11. Some of the Union vessels provided supporting fire during the operations. January 12 saw the ironclads USS Baron de Kalb and USS Cincinnati move up the White River, in conjunction with an army movement towards St. Charles, Arkansas. Romeo was sent upriver after the two ironclads, bearing supplies. When St. Charles was reached, it was found that the Confederates had abandoned it, taking two cannons with them on a transport vessel. Baron de Kalb and Romeo continued upriver with a loaded troop transport and the tinclad USS Forest Rose in pursuit of the Confederate transport. The expedition reached DeValls Bluff on January 17, where it captured two cannons, 200 small arms, and some prisoners. These were the same two cannons that the Confederates had taken upriver from St. Charles. Forest Rose, Romeo, and a troop transport continued to Des Arc the next day, where they took prisoners and captured corn and ammunition. Having determined that flooding would make an overland advance on Little Rock infeasible, the Union force then turned back downriver, destroying much of St. Charles on the way.

=== Vicksburg and Yazoo City ===
Marmora, which was also a sternwheel tinclad

Romeo returned to the Yazoo River on February 6, 1863, and afterwards participated in the Yazoo Pass expedition. Along with other vessels under the command of Watson Smith, Romeo arrived at Helena on February 12; at this time Union soldiers were still working on clearing obstructions from the Yazoo Pass. Once Smith received word that the removal of the obstructions was mostly complete, his vessels moved downriver from Helena to the Yazoo Pass area; by the afternoon of February 21, Romeo, five other warships, and several supply vessels had entered Moon Lake through a cut between the lake and the Mississippi River. Romeo and the other tinclads assigned to the operation were dispersed through the column of ships. This dispersion was done to guard the transports and assist the coal barges in traversing the pass. The path of the Union expedition ran from Moon Lake through Old Pass into the Coldwater River. Moving through the waterways was difficult. Some of the vessels were damaged by thick vegetation that lined the banks; Romeo had both of her chimneys knocked off. As part of the expedition, she was involved in the fighting around the Fort Pemberton area on the Tallahatchie River from March 11 through 23. Romeo and the other tinclads USS Petrel and USS Signal were loaded with troops, with plans of bringing the troops forward to storm Fort Pemberton if a Union effort on March 16 could knock out the Confederate guns, but the Confederate guns were not silenced and the landing did not occur.

Acting Volunteer Lieutenant John V. Johnston was ordered to take command of Romeo on April 18. On April 29 and 30, Romeo was part of a feint designed to draw Confederate attention from the primary Union movement further downstream. During the continuing operations against Vicksburg, Romeo provided naval support, engaging Confederate troops at river landings to help cut off the city. On May 19, once Union land forces had reached the vicinity of Vicksburg, Romeo was part of a Union naval force that ascended the Yazoo River to open up contact with the army positions. The next day, she returned to the Mississippi River. On the morning of June 7, the appearance of Romeo and Petrel played a role in causing Confederate forces to abandon a planned assault on Young's Point. (Note: Young's Point was a Union supply base on the Louisiana bank of the Mississippi River. The importance of the Young's Point supply center to Grant's campaign was greatly reduced after an alternate supply line was developed from the Yazoo River between May 19 and 21.) In mid-June, the tinclads were assigned identifying numbers to be painted on their pilothouses; Romeo was given the number 3. On June 29, she fired on Confederate raiding forces during part of the Battle of Goodrich's Landing. Late on July 2, Confederate forces in the Donaldsonville, Louisiana, area deployed an artillery battery to ambush Union shipping. Not long after deploying, the transport Iberville came past the ambush point. Confederate artillery fire disabled Iberville, but Romeo then passed through the area escorting another transport. The two transports were able to escape while Romeo engaged the battery.

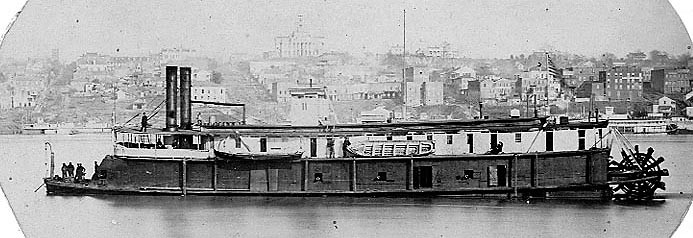
Prairie Bird, another tinclad that Romeo served with at times

In anticipation of the fall of Vicksburg (which occurred on July 4), the ships of the Mississippi River Squadron had been divided into sub-districts for administrative purposes. Following an August revision, Romeo was assigned to the Fifth District, which was commanded by Lieutenant Commander Elias K. Owen and encompassed the area from Vicksburg to the mouths of the Arkansas and White Rivers. In August, Romeo was part of a small naval force that operated on the White River in conjunction with Brigadier General John W. Davidson's cavalry command in the Little Rock campaign. Romeo was in poor condition, and did not participate in an operation up the Little Red River that resulted in the capture of two Confederate vessels. It was later determined that the repairs were extensive enough to require a dry dock. In October she was transferred to the Tennessee River, having been repaired. By November 12, Romeo was considered to be no longer needed for convoy duties on the Tennessee, and later that month she was sent back to Cairo before returning to the Tennessee River the next month. By January 1864, she was back on the Mississippi River, stationed near Bolivar, Mississippi, as of January 8, and on January 15 was reported to be commanded by Acting Master Thomas Baldwin.

On February 2, Romeo re-entered the Yazoo River, as part of a squadron commanded by Owen that also included the tinclads USS Exchange, Marmora, Prairie Bird, and Petrel. Owen's command was to cooperate with an army brigade commanded by Colonel James H. Coates. The expedition fought a minor skirmish with Confederate forces near Satartia, Mississippi, that day before facing heavier resistance near Liverpool the next day. In the action at Liverpool, Romeo passed the Confederate position before the Confederate artillery finished deploying, but the other vessels were halted when the artillery opened fire. Romeo moved back downriver to support the other vessels. A Union infantry landing and assault were unsuccessful. Romeo was struck by small-arms fire in the fighting at Liverpool, but suffered no significant damage. On February 4, the Union vessels successfully ran past the Confederate position at Liverpool, reaching a mill 6 miles (10 km) from Yazoo City. Most of the force remained in the area of the mill while Exchange and Marmora continued on to Yazoo City, which they found held by Confederate forces. The next day, the expedition withdrew to Satartia. After the Meridian campaign drew Confederate troops away from the Yazoo City area, the Union forces occupied it on February 9.

=== Later service ===
Romeo was assigned in May to the area between Vicksburg and Natchez, Mississippi, for patrol duties, although she also patrolled as far as the mouth of the Arkansas River. She continued in this duty for most of the rest of the war. On May 24, Confederate horse artillery under the command of Colonel Colton Greene opened fire on the tinclad USS Curlew from the banks of the Mississippi River in Arkansas. This was part of a multi-week campaign led by Greene against Union shipping; the Confederates had an advantage because the land-based artillery could move across the base curves in the river while the Union ships had to steam the long way around. The artillery left when the timberclad USS Tyler approached the area, and Curlew moved upriver to join Romeo. Together, the two tinclads escorted the transport Nicholas Longworth downriver. Curlew had a mechanical failure on the way downriver, and was left behind. Near Columbia, Arkansas, Romeo and Nicholas Longworth came under artillery fire from Greene's repositioned artillery. Romeo fought with the Confederates while Nicholas Longworth continued on downriver. However, the transport came under more Confederate fire. Romeo ran out of ammunition and had to return to where Curlew had been left behind to pick up more. Together, Romeo and the transport were able to make it downriver to Greenville, Mississippi, although both vessels had suffered damage to their hulls and upper structure. Two vessels from the Mississippi Marine Brigade escorted the transport downriver, while Romeo anchored off Columbia for repairs. Greene's mobile artillery also returned to Columbia, and further damaged Romeo. One sailor on Romeo was wounded; Greene reported that his artillery fire had struck Romeo 17 times.

On August 10, Romeo intervened when Confederate artillery and cavalry near Gaines Landing, Arkansas, badly damaged and almost captured the packet steamer Empress. Romeo fired her two bow guns at the Confederates, and used a hawser to tow Empress to safety. Romeo towed the steamer 5 miles (8 km) upriver to a landing where Empress' mechanical damage was repaired. The following morning, Romeo escorted the civilian vessel another 25 miles (40 km) to safety, and later in the day came to the assistance of Prairie Bird when that vessel was fired on by Confederate forces near where Empress had been fired on the day before. Aside from a short assignment to the Ohio River late in the war, Romeo operated in the region between Natchez and the mouth of the Arkansas. On September 30, Romeo was fired on by a group of Confederate guerrillas, who were driven off without the Union ship suffering any casualties. Romeo was one of the vessels earmarked in late April 1865 to patrol portions of the Mississippi River where fleeing Confederate president Jefferson Davis was expected to try to cross the river; Davis was eventually captured in Georgia in May. With the war winding down in April and May as a Confederate defeat, Romeo returned to Cairo in May, and was determined to be surplus on May 29 as part of the postwar reduction in the strength of the navy.

On June 30, she was decommissioned at Mound City, Illinois. Romeo and the other surplus tinclads had their armor and protective features, as well as their armaments, removed. Including vessels other than tinclads, sixty-three surplus vessels were anchored between Cairo and Mound City in preparation for sale. On August 17, she was sold at auction. (Note: According to the Official Records of the Union and Confederate Navies, this was in the amount of $7,100 to Nathaniel Williams. Mark K. Christ, writing for the Encyclopedia of Arkansas, provides Nathaniel Williams as the name of her purchaser. Way's Packet Directory names her purchaser as Edward Williams and gives a purchase price of $7,150. The naval historian Myron J. Smith states that Edward Williams paid $7,100 for the vessel.) After her sale, she was converted into a sidewheel steamer. Romeo was used in the merchant trade at Evansville, Indiana, captained by J. Ham Throop; George Throop was her clerk. In 1870, she ceased to appear in the shipping registers.

== Sources ==
- Bearss, Edwin C. (1985). The Campaign for Vicksburg. Vol. I: Vicksburg is the Key. Dayton, Ohio: Morningside House. ISBN 089029-312-0.
- Bearss, Edwin C. (1991) [1986]. The Campaign for Vicksburg. Vol. III: Unvexed to the Sea. Dayton, Ohio: Morningside Bookshop. ISBN 0-89029-516-6.
- Breese, K. R. (1911). "Order of Lieutenant-Commander Breese, U.S. Navy, to Acting Volunteer Lieutenant Johnston, U.S. Navy, to Assume Command of U.S.S. Romeo". In Stewart, Charles W. (ed.). Official Records of the Union and Confederate Navies in the War of the Rebellion. 1. Vol. 24. Washington, D.C.: Government Printing Office. p. 569. OCLC 427057.
- Christ, Mark K. (2010). Civil War Arkansas 1863: The Battle for a State. Norman, Oklahoma: University of Oklahoma Press. ISBN 978-0-8061-4433-7.
- Hearn, Chester G. (2000). Ellet's Brigade: The Strangest Outfit of All. Baton Rouge, Louisiana: Louisiana State University Press. ISBN 0-8071-2559-8.
- Kennedy, Frances H., ed. (1998). The Civil War Battlefield Guide (2nd ed.). Boston/New York: Houghton Mifflin. ISBN 978-0-395-74012-5.
- Official Records of the Union and Confederate Navies in the War of the Rebellion, Series 2. Vol. 1. Washington, D.C.: Government Printing Office. 1921.
- Owen, E. K. (1912). "Report of Lieutenant-Commander Owen, U.S. Navy, Giving Information of Confederate Force Approaching the Mississippi River from the Yazoo". In Stewart, Charles W. (ed.). Official Records of the Union and Confederate Navies in the War of the Rebellion. 1. Vol. 25. Washington, D.C.: Government Printing Office. pp. 678–679. OCLC 427057.
- Phelps, S. L. (1912). "Report of Lieutenant-Commander Phelps, U.S. Navy, Regarding Withdrawal of U.S.S. Romeo from Further Duty in the Tennessee River". In Stewart, Charles W. (ed.). Official Records of the Union and Confederate Navies in the War of the Rebellion. 1. Vol. 25. Washington, D.C.: Government Printing Office. p. 486. OCLC 427057.
- Porter, David D. (1912). "Report of Rear-Admiral Porter, U.S. Navy, Transmitting List of Vessels of His Command". In Stewart, Charles W. (ed.). Official Records of the Union and Confederate Navies in the War of the Rebellion. 1. Vol. 25. Washington, D.C.: Government Printing Office. pp. 691–692. OCLC 427057.
- Silverstone, Paul H. (1989). Warships of the Civil War Navies. Annapolis, Maryland: Naval Institute Press. ISBN 0-87021-783-6.
- Smith, Myron J. (2010). Tinclads in the Civil War: Union Light-Draught Gunboat Operations on Western Waters, 1862–1865. Jefferson, North Carolina: McFarland & Company. ISBN 978-0-7864-3579-1.
- Smith, Myron J. (2012). The Fight for the Yazoo, August 1862–July 1864: Swamps, Forts and Fleets on Vicksburg's Northern Flank. Jefferson, North Carolina: McFarland & Company. ISBN 978-0-7864-6281-0.
- Smith, Myron J. (2021). After Vicksburg: The Civil War on Western Waters, 1863–1865. Jefferson, North Carolina: McFarland & Company. ISBN 978-1-4766-4370-0.
- Tomblin, Barbara Brooks (2016). The Civil War on the Mississippi: Union Sailors, Gunboat Captains, and the Campaign to Control the River. Lexington, Kentucky: University Press of Kentucky. ISBN 978-0-8131-6704-6.
- Tucker, Spencer C., ed. (2011). The Civil War Naval Encyclopedia. Santa Barbara, California: ABC-CLIO. ISBN 978-1-59884-338-5.
- Way, Frederick (1994). Way's Packet Directory, 1848–1994: Passenger Steamboats of the Mississippi River System Since the Advent of Photography in Mid-Continent America. Athens, Ohio: Ohio University Press. ISBN 0821411063.
- Winschel, Terrence J. (2004) [1999]. Triumph and Defeat: The Vicksburg Campaign. Vol. I. New York, New York: Savas Beatie. ISBN 1-932714-04-9.
