= Richard M. Gaines =

Mississippi and Arkansas lawyer (1802–1871)

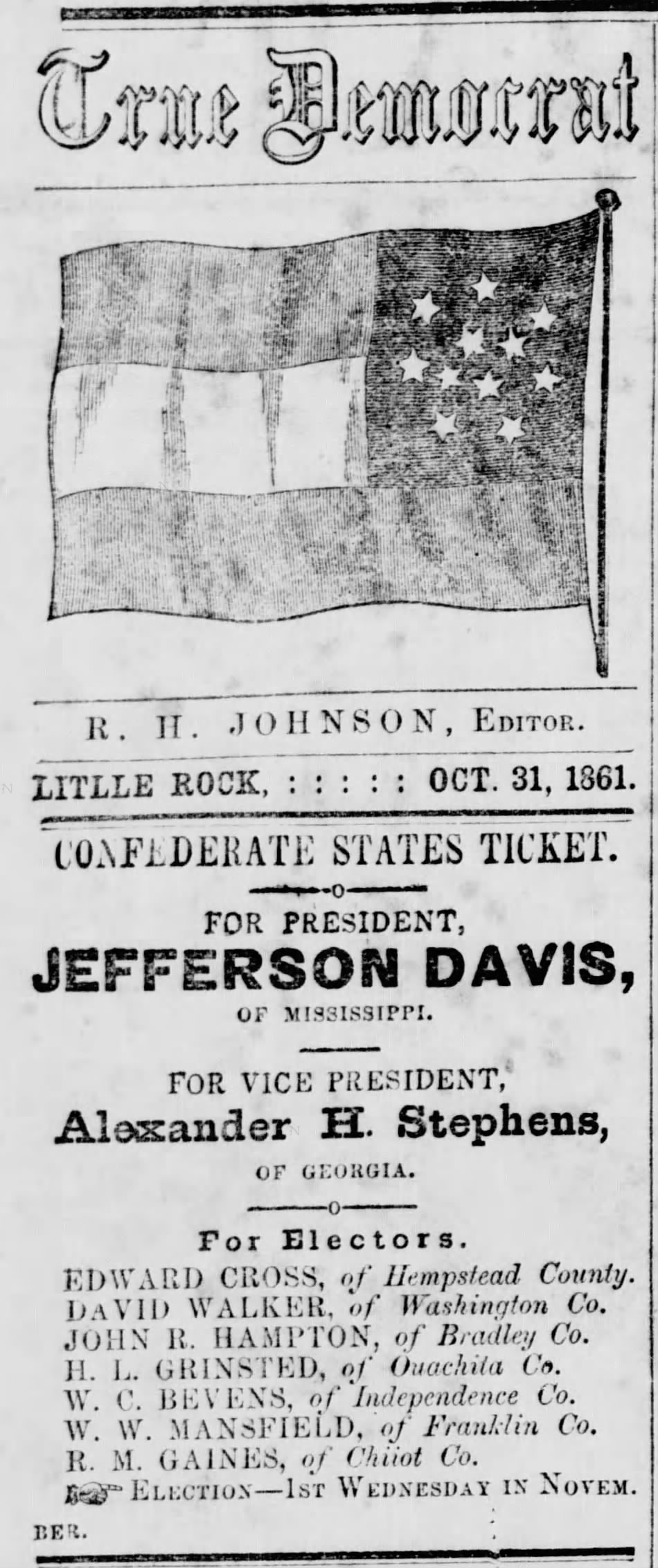
- Confederate States Ticket, True Democrat, Little Rock, Arkansas, October 31, 1861
- Born: February 28, 1802; Kentucky
- Died: August 2, 1871 (aged 69); Chicot County, Arkansas

Richard Mathews Gaines (February 28, 1802–August 2, 1871), often signing as R. M. Gaines, was a 19th-century American lawyer and politician. He served as the Mississippi state attorney general for four years in the 1830s. He was the United States federal district attorney in southern Mississippi for almost 15 years, originally appointed by Andrew Jackson. He moved to Arkansas around 1850 where he had a plantation and was elected to the Arkansas State Senate. He served as a Confederate presidential elector in 1861.

== Mississippi ==
Gaines was one of the sons of Abner LeGrand Gaines and Susan Mathews of Virginia and Kentucky. His older brother John Pollard Gaines was appointed governor of Oregon Territory in 1850. The several Gaines brothers are perhaps best known today as the enslavers of Margaret Garner, whose attempt to escape from slavery and murder of her children became the basis of Toni Morrison's novel Beloved.

Gaines moved to Mississippi in 1823. Gaines Landing, Arkansas, an extinct settlement in Chicot County, was named for his family; his brother Benjamin Gaines first settled land there in 1824. According to the Centennial History of Arkansas, "Most of the early settlers [of Chicot County] were 'squatters,' who did little in the way of permanent improvements. Those who came a little later located near the Mississippi and for several years the settlements did not extend far inland." According to his 1871 obit, written by a friend who had known him since the mid-1850s: "[Gaines] moved to the State of Mississippi when a young man, and engaged in the practice of law, carrying with him a commission from President Jackson, as district attorney of the United States for Mississippi. The stern old patriot who gave him this appointment, never had a truer political follower or a more devoted admirer than he had in General Gaines."

Gaines married Eliza B. Hutchins in Natchez in 1830; she was a relative of early Mississippi colonist Anthony Hutchins. Gaines was attorney general for the state of Mississippi from 1830 to 1834. In 1832 he wrote to the Governor of Mississippi discouraging the imposition of the death sentence of a convict named Stephen who had shot at his legal owner "to 'scare him to make him treat him better.'" Gaines told the governor, "I prosecuted him, and the defence was altogether inadequate to the importance of the case, as the defence of negroes always is." Despite Gaines' advocacy for rule of law and a fairer judicial system, "The governor nonetheless declined to prevent Stephen's hanging." In the 1830s, he was an officer of the Mississippi Colonization Society.

In 1834 he was on a committee working to organize a Natchez and Hamburg Railroad, intended to connect Natchez to the Pearl River; construction got as far as Franklin County, Mississippi before the Panic of 1837 halted progress. He was a candidate for the Mississippi state legislature from Adams County in 1835. In 1836 he was "among the first to practice law" in recently settled Chicot County, Arkansas. The same year he bought the Gostic Place Plantation on the Natchez–Woodville road. He was appointed to the office of the United States attorney for the District of Mississippi by Andrew Jackson and served from 1836 to 1838. In 1838 he observed the Choctaw Commission investigating the dispossession and expulsion of the Choctaw by the U.S. government.

Jackson's successor appointed him to be U.S. attorney for the Southern District of Mississippi in July 9, 1840, and he served in that office until 1850, with reappointments March 13, 1844, and also March 22, 1848. In January 1840 Gaines was one of the co-sponsors of a grand dinner at Natchez to celebrate guest of honor Andrew Jackson. Jackson, despite being quite ill and frail at this point in his life, had come to the lower Mississippi to celebrate the 25th anniversary of the Battle of New Orleans. Gaines' wife, Eliza Hutchins Gaines, died of a torn pericardium in November 1840. In 1842 he wrote Andrew Jackson about a debt of about US$2,400 (equivalent to $72,563 in 2025) that was owed by Andrew Jackson Jr. to Dr. Wm. M. Gwin. An 1843 newspaper article, possibly written by Thomas Fletcher, described Gaines as "energetic and rigidly conscientious in the discharge of his duties," which may account for the article's further description of him as "now scarce forty and...gray as a Norwegian rat." Also in 1843 he was named one of seven trustees of Jefferson College. He toasted to Jefferson Davis' Mississippi Rifles in 1847, "They have acted out the spirit of that mother who told her son to bring back his shield or be brought back upon it. Their fame is the property of their country, but especially of the state which sent them forth to battle. They are as 'a city set upon a hill which cannot be hid.'" The same year he was in a law partnership with a young attorney named William T. Martin.

== Arkansas ==
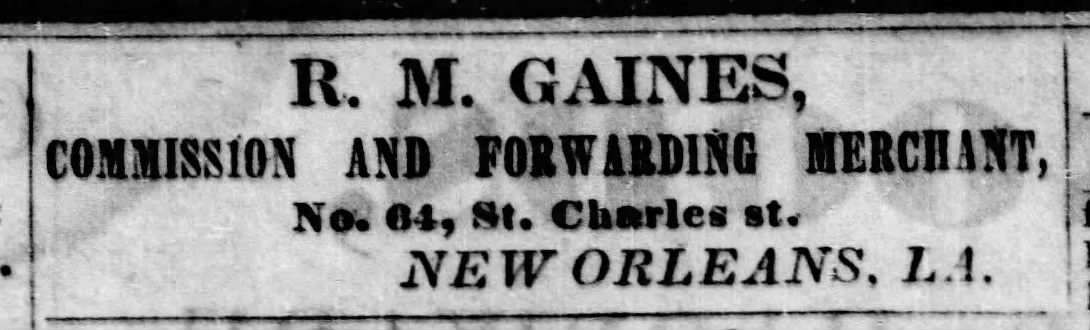
Fort Smith Weekly Herald, March 21, 1851

Sometime before 1851, "having a fine property, he moved to Chicot county and settled...devoting his time and attention mostly, after he same to this State, to planting, and in this he was successful as in the practice of law. " As executor of the estate of Samuel Hunter, Gaines became party to a notable court case regarding the inheritance of slaves attached to the estate; this went to the Mississippi Supreme Court in 1853. Gaines was also party to an 1873 Arkansas Supreme Court case involving a $7,000 loan made in 1855 by Gaines, his brother Benjamin Gaines, and a third brother Abner Gaines, who was the debtor's commission agent.

In 1856, Gaines, his brother Abner Gaines, and third man, James F. Robinson, were law partners working in Chicot County, Arkansas, based in the now-extinct county seat, Columbia, which was later destroyed by a combination of the Mississippi River and the U.S. Army during the American Civil War. Gaines became one of the first attorneys to work at the new Chicot County courthouse established at Lake Village in 1857. Gaines was elected in 1856 to represent the counties of Drew, Ashley, and Chicot in the Arkansas State Senate from 1857 to 1858. In 1859 he concluded an address with the statement, "I fear a crisis in this country in 1860, and when the battle comes between the democratic party and the black republicans, I shall be found willing (if alive) to fight in the ranks." The following year, Gaines of Macon Lake was one of the county's "more prominent planters" when he was sent as a representative to the Arkansas state Democratic Party convention.

Arkansas Confederate Harris Reynolds recorded in his civil war diary entry of August 24, 1861, "Gen. R. M. Gaines of Chicot reached camp today and we were all glad to see him as he has from the first taken a deep interest in our welfare and assisted us by means and by his presence. He brought news from home and none but those who have been absent for a long time can tell how to appreciate news from home." In early September, Harris recorded that they "Named camp 'Camp Gaines' in honor of Gen. R. M. Gaines." Around the same time, Gaines was selected to be a Confederate presidential elector and wrote to the newspaper, "None will deny my fidelity to the South. I can vote for Jeff. Davis, not only for the sake of the cause, but in accordance with my personal feelings, having known him many years." In December 1862 Gaines wrote a letter to the editor about the war effort, commenting on logistics and supply issues, and stated that (at age 60) he was physically unable to serve but supported the Confederate cause to the best of his ability.

In 1867, following the defeat of the Confederacy, Gaines was signatory to a petition complaining that freedmen were rustling livestock for food. It must have been a hard time for the Whites, as their old system had failed and in Chicot County, they protested, "The colored population is largely disproportional to the white population, constituting nine-tenths of the whole." The petition predicted that "a collision between races" was imminent, which came to pass in part in 1871 with the Chicot Massacre. (Three White men stabbed to death Walthal G. Wynn, "a black Howard University-educated lawyer," in a dispute over taxes. A Black mob pulled the Whites out of jail and lynched them.) Gaines was listed on the national bankruptcy register in 1869. Gaines died on his plantation in Arkansas in August 1871.

== Personal life ==
He was called General Gaines in part "as a courtesy" and in part as a joking reference to his last name and the association with General Edmund P. Gaines. They were in fact distant cousins descended from the same immigrant ancestor but Abner LeGrand Gaines's line is relatively poorly documented.

He was married to Eliza B. Hutchins in Mississippi in 1830. A son born in 1831, John H. Gaines, served as a surgeon in the Confederate States army and later worked as a physician in Hot Springs, Arkansas.

== See also ==
- Abner Gaines House
- Gaines' Landing, Arkansas
- Honorifics in the antebellum U.S. South

== Sources ==
- n.a. (April 1976). "Gaines Family" (PDF). The Arkansas Family Historian. 14 (2). Hot Springs, Arkansas: Arkansas Genealogical Society: 74–91. ISSN 0571-0472. OCLC 3734312.
- n.a. (1889). Biographical and historical memoirs of Pulaski, Jefferson, Lonoke, Faulkner, Grant, Saline, Perry, Garland and Hot Spring counties, Arkansas. Chicago: The Goodspeed Publishing Co.
- Bender, Robert Patrick, ed. (2011). Worthy of the Cause for Which They Fight: The Civil War Diary of Brigadier General Harris Reynolds, 1861–1865. Fayetteville, Arkansas: University of Arkansas Press. doi:10.1353/book13142. ISBN 978-1-61075-485-9. LCCN 2011027202. OCLC 787842843.
- Executive Office for United States Attorneys (1989). Bicentennial Celebration of United States Attorneys, 1789–1989 (PDF) (Report). Washington, D.C.: United States Department of Justice.
- Herndon, Dallas T. (1922). Centennial History of Arkansas. Chicago: The S. J. Clarke Publishing Co.
- James, D. Clayton (1993) [1968]. Antebellum Natchez. Baton Rouge, Louisiana: Louisiana State University Press. ISBN 978-0-8071-1860-3. LCCN 68028496. OCLC 28281641.
- Jones, J. Wayne (2000). "Seeding Chicot: The Isaac H. Hilliard Plantation and the Arkansas Delta". The Arkansas Historical Quarterly. 59 (2): 147–185. doi:10.2307/40025437. ISSN 0004-1823. JSTOR 40025437.
- Kaye, Anthony E. (2010). Joining Places: Slave Neighborhoods in the Old South. The John Hope Franklin Series in African American history and Culture. Chapel Hill, North Carolina: University of North Carolina Press. ISBN 978-1-4696-0614-9. LCCN 2007003201. OCLC 966767526. Project MUSE book 44109.
- Sutherd, Calvin E. (August 1972). A Compilation of Gaines Family Data, with Special Emphasis on the Lineage of William and Isabella (Pendleton) Gaines (Rev. ed.). Fort Lauderdale, Florida: Riverside Press. LCCN 72086413. OCLC 482743.
