= USS Prairie Bird =

Gunboat of the United States Navy

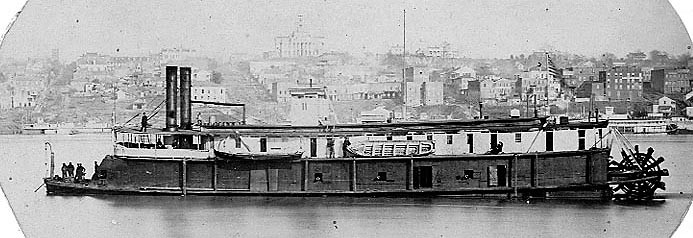
- Photographed off Vicksburg, Mississippi, circa 1864–65. Note Vicksburg courthouse on the hilltop in left center.

History

United States
- Acquired: 19 December 1862
- Commissioned: January 1863
- Decommissioned: July 1865
- Fate: Sold, 17 August 1865

General characteristics
- Displacement: 171 tons
- Length: 159 ft 10 in (48.72 m)
- Beam: 29 ft 3 in (8.92 m)
- Draft: 5 ft (1.5 m)
- Depth of hold: 4 ft 2 in (1.27 m)
- Propulsion: steam engine; stern wheel-propelled
- Speed: 6 knots (11 km/h; 6.9 mph)
- Armament: eight 24-pounder guns

USS Prairie Bird was a steamship commissioned by the Union Navy during the American Civil War.

She served the Union navy fleet as a gunboat during operations on Mississippi River and its tributaries.

== Service history ==
Prairie Bird, a "tinclad" wooden steamer purchased as Mary Miller at Cincinnati, Ohio, 19 December 1862, was fitted out at Cairo, Illinois, renamed Prairie Bird and commissioned in January 1863, Acting Master J. C. Moore in command. Prairie Bird steamed down the Mississippi River in mid-February 1863, to assist USS Juliet, grounded 20 miles below Island No. 10. She then continued on to Memphis, Tennessee, whence she escorted a provision ship to the Yazoo River, where she joined the Mississippi Squadron. At the end of the month she took up station above the White River to protect a coal depot. In mid-March she shifted to Greenville; in April, she operated at the mouth of the White River; and in May, she returned to Memphis.

Remaining in the Arkansas-White River area into the following spring, she reconnoitered the Sunflower River, as far as Lake George and Silver Creek, with USS Petrel in March 1864. In April she steamed with Petrel and Freestone up the Yazoo River to fire on and pass Yazoo City, Mississippi, in support of Union Army operation against that city. On the 22nd Prairie Bird, having received engine damage, rescued survivors from Petrel, then retired to Vicksburg for repairs. Assigned to the 6th District, Mississippi Squadron, for most of the remainder of the war, Prairie Bird operated between Vicksburg, Mississippi, and the Arkansas River. On 21 July she seized the steamer Union for violation of revenue laws and giving "aid and comfort to the enemy." On the 23rd she rescued 350 of 500 passengers aboard B. M. Runyan, sunk off Skipwith's Landing, and on 11 August she engaged the enemy battery at Gaines Landing, Arkansas, in support of operations there.

The following December she joined with other vessels and Union Army units to cut the rebel communications in Mississippi and on the 31st assisted blowing the railway bridge over the Big Black River. Prairie Bird remained in the 6th District until March 1865. Then sent to Mound City, Illinois, she remained a unit of the Mississippi Squadron until ordered decommissioned in July. On 17 August 1865 she was sold by public auction to Henry Morton.

== See also ==
- Anaconda Plan
