= Lake Whittington =

- Location within Arkansas Location within Mississippi Location within the United States
- Location: Bolivar County, Mississippi; Desha County, Arkansas; United States
- Coordinates: 33°39′44″N 91°04′13″W
- Type: Oxbow lake
- Basin countries: United States
- Max. length: 12 mi (19 km)
- Surface area: 2,300 acres (930 ha)
- Surface elevation: 118 ft (36 m) at normal pool

Lake Whittington is an oxbow lake located in Bolivar County, Mississippi, and Desha County, Arkansas, United States. The Arkansas-Mississippi border follows the center of the narrow, curving lake.

Prior to 1938, the north-south flowing Mississippi River curved east into Mississippi, flowed along Lake Whittington (then called "Bolivar Bend"), and then continued its north-south route.

== History ==
The town of Bolivar, Mississippi, located on the east shore of Bolivar Bend, was protected by a small levee prior to the Civil War. In 1863, the Union gunboat USS Conestoga cut the levee, causing significant flooding to the town and surrounding area.

Island No. 76 was located in Bolivar Bend, just north of Bolivar. During the Civil War, the island was used by the Union Army as a woodyard, and a group of freed slaves lived there, cutting and stacking wood. In 1865, the Union transport ship James Watson ran aground on the island and caught fire, killing 24. The island is now called "Goat Island".

In 1933, the United States Army Corps of Engineers began construction of 13 cutoffs along the lower Mississippi River. Previous cutoffs had been constructed along the river, and were of commercial benefit because they allowed ships to bypass lengthy U-shaped bends. Typically, cutoffs were created by digging a channel across a peninsula, leaving the bypassed bend to form an oxbow lake. Lake Whittington was created when the "Caulk Neck Cutoff" was constructed across "Caulk Island" peninsula in 1937–1938.

== Communities ==
There was once year-round high-water public access to Lake Whittington at Neblett's Landing, just north of Bolivar, Mississippi, the only community located on the lake, but that ramp has now been purchased by a private hunting club and is closed to the public. Public access is still possible through two chutes to the Mississippi River, accessible only when the river is at three to six feet on the Arkansas City gauge, and from Little Man's Landing, which is only open during the summer months depending on water level.

Cottages and hunting lodges dot the Mississippi side of the lake.

A private airport with a grass surface, Catfish Point Airport, is located at the south end of the lake.

== Largemouth bass virus ==
The Lake has been reported as infected with Largemouth Bass Virus (LMBV). Fish should not be transferred from this lake, and care should be taken to disinfect livewells with bleach after fishing this lake.

== Characteristics ==
A small channel on the south end of the lake connects to the Mississippi River. This channel permits spawning fish to enter Lake Whittington, and provides recreational boaters with access to the river. The channel also causes water levels in Lake Whittington to rise and fall along with the seasonal variations in water level in the Mississippi River. During the fall, when water levels in the Mississippi River are typically at their lowest, Lake Whittington may be completely cut off from the river, and water levels in the lake decrease to form three pools of water.

Fish species found in Lake Whittington include bream (bluegill), buffalo, channel catfish, common carp, crappie, drum, flathead catfish, gar, green sunfish, largemouth bass, minnows, silversides, sunfish, white bass, and yellow bass.

Duckweed is the major aquatic vegetation.

Although the lake can be legally fished with either an Arkansas or Mississippi fishing license, all vehicles and most recreational boats can only access the lake from Mississippi.
