= Battle of Snyder's Bluff =

Battle of the American Civil War

- Part of the American Civil War
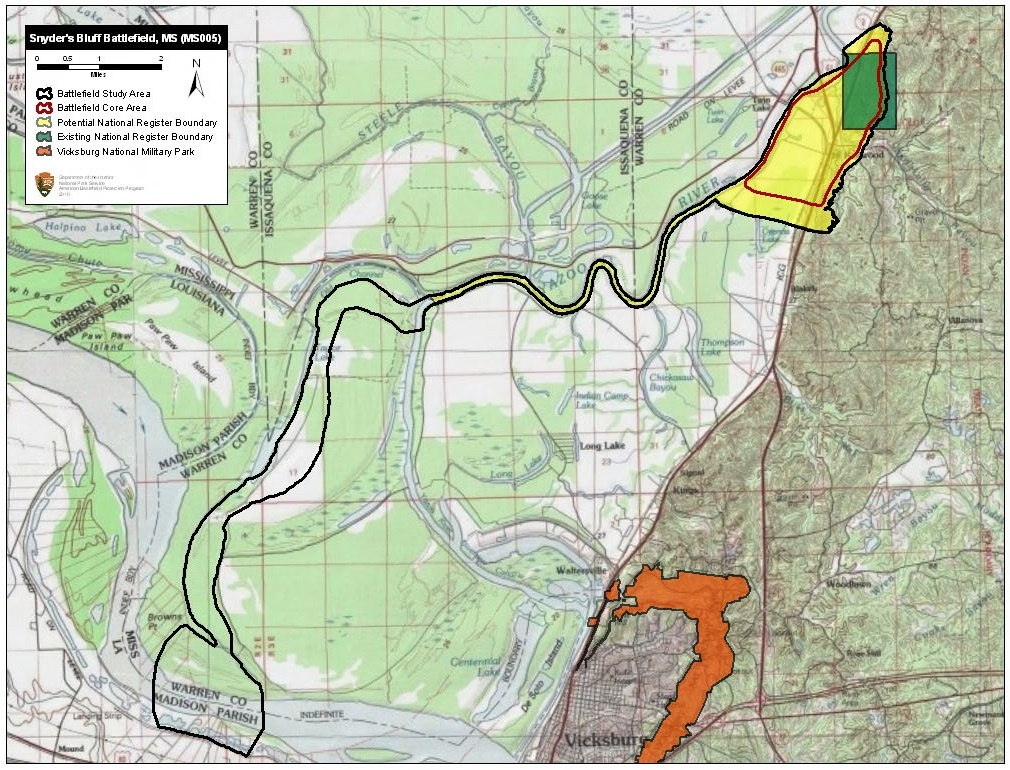
- Map of Snyder's Bluff Battlefield core and study areas by the American Battlefield Protection Program
Date	April 29 – May 1, 1863
Location	Warren County, Mississippi 32°29′47″N 90°48′00″W
Result	Confederate victory

Belligerents
United States (Federals)	(Confederate States of America) CSA (Confederacy)

Commanders and leaders
William T. Sherman	Louis Hébert

Units involved
Blair's Division, XV Corps; Mississippi River Squadron	Snyder's and Drumgould's Bluffs defenses

The Battle of Snyder's Bluff was fought from April 29 to May 1, 1863, during the Vicksburg Campaign of the American Civil War. Federal Major General Ulysses S. Grant had decided to move most of his army down the west bank of the Mississippi River and then cross south of Vicksburg, Mississippi, at Grand Gulf as part of his campaign against the city. To cover his planned crossing, Major General William T. Sherman took Francis P. Blair Jr.'s division of his XV Corps on a maneuver up the Yazoo River to feint at Confederate defenses at Snyder's Bluff and Drumgould's Bluff.

Along with a naval force commanded by Lieutenant Commander K. Randolph Breese, Sherman's men entered the Yazoo River on April 29, and the next day approached the Confederate defenses. Breese's ships bombarded the Confederate defenses in the morning, while in the afternoon, a land assault accomplished little and failed to convince the Confederates that the Yazoo River expedition was anything more than a distraction. On May 1, more infantry probes were made, but Sherman received orders from Grant to return to the main Federal force as a result of operations in the Grand Gulf area. A gunboat bombardment on the afternoon of May 1 caused more damage than the previous day's. The operation failed to convince the Confederates that it was anything more than a feint. While reinforcements to Grand Gulf were delayed, this was not caused by Sherman's operation. Federal naval element had been unable to silence Confederate defenses at Grand Gulf in the Battle of Grand Gulf on April 29, but Grant simply moved his crossing further downriver. The campaign ended in a Federal victory on July 4 and represented a major turning point in the war.

== Background ==
Grant's Operations against Vicksburg Confederate Federal

Early in the American Civil War, Federal military leadership developed the Anaconda Plan, which was a strategy to defeat the Confederate States of America. A significant component of this strategy was controlling the Mississippi River. Much of the Mississippi Valley fell under Federal control in early 1862 after the capture of New Orleans, Louisiana, and several land victories. The strategically important city of Vicksburg, Mississippi, was still in Confederate hands, serving as both a strong defensive position by commanding the river and as the linchpin between the two halves of the Confederacy. Federal Navy elements were sent upriver from New Orleans in May to try to take the city, a move that was ultimately unsuccessful. In late June, a joint army-navy expedition returned to make another campaign against Vicksburg. Federal Navy leadership decided that the city could not be taken without more infantrymen, who were not forthcoming. An attempt to cut a canal across a meander of the river, bypassing Vicksburg, failed.

In late November, about 40,000 Federal infantry commanded by Major General Ulysses S. Grant began moving south towards Vicksburg from a starting point in Tennessee. Grant ordered a retreat after a supply depot and part of his supply line were destroyed during the Holly Springs Raid and Forrest's West Tennessee Raid. Meanwhile, another arm of the expedition under the command of Major General William T. Sherman left Memphis, Tennessee, on the same day as the Holly Springs Raid and traveled down the Mississippi River. After diverting up the Yazoo River, Sherman's men began skirmishing with Confederate soldiers defending a line of hills above the Chickasaw Bayou. A Federal attack on December 29 was defeated decisively at the Battle of Chickasaw Bayou, and Sherman's men withdrew on January 1, 1863.

== Prelude ==
By late March, further attempts to bypass Vicksburg had failed. Grant then considered three plans: to withdraw to Memphis and retry the overland route through northern Mississippi; to move south along the west side of the Mississippi River, cross below Vicksburg, and then strike for the city; or to make an amphibious assault across the river against Vicksburg. An assault across the river risked heavy casualties, and a withdrawal to Memphis could be politically disastrous if the public perceived such a movement as a retreat. Grant then decided upon the downstream crossing. The advance along the west bank of the Mississippi began on March 29, and was spearheaded by Major General John A. McClernand's troops. The movement down the river was masked by decoy operations such as Steele's Greenville expedition, Streight's Raid, and Grierson's Raid. Confederate regional commander John C. Pemberton fell for the Federal decoys (especially Grierson's Raid), and lost touch with the true tactical situation, believing Grant was withdrawing.

By late April, McClernand's men had made the march downriver, and Major General James B. McPherson's men were on the way. Major General William T. Sherman's XV Corps was intended to follow later, but, on April 27, Grant changed his plan for Sherman's men. An attack at Grand Gulf, Mississippi, followed by an amphibious crossing by McClernand's corps, was planned for April 29, and Grant wanted to divert Confederate attention away from the crossing attempt. Sherman and a detachment from the XV Corps were to, if practical, approach Confederate defensive works 12 miles (19 km) northeast of Vicksburg at Snyder's Bluff and conduct a feint. Grant expressed some hesitancy about the feint, and left final judgment to Sherman; Grant feared that the failure of the mock attack would be viewed by the Northern public as another Chickasaw Bayou-style defeat. Unconcerned about the opinions of the press, Sherman decided to continue on. However, Sherman carried some doubts about Grant's overall plan, fearing that it might be necessary for Sherman to take his whole corps downriver and bail out Grant in case of failure.

== Battle ==
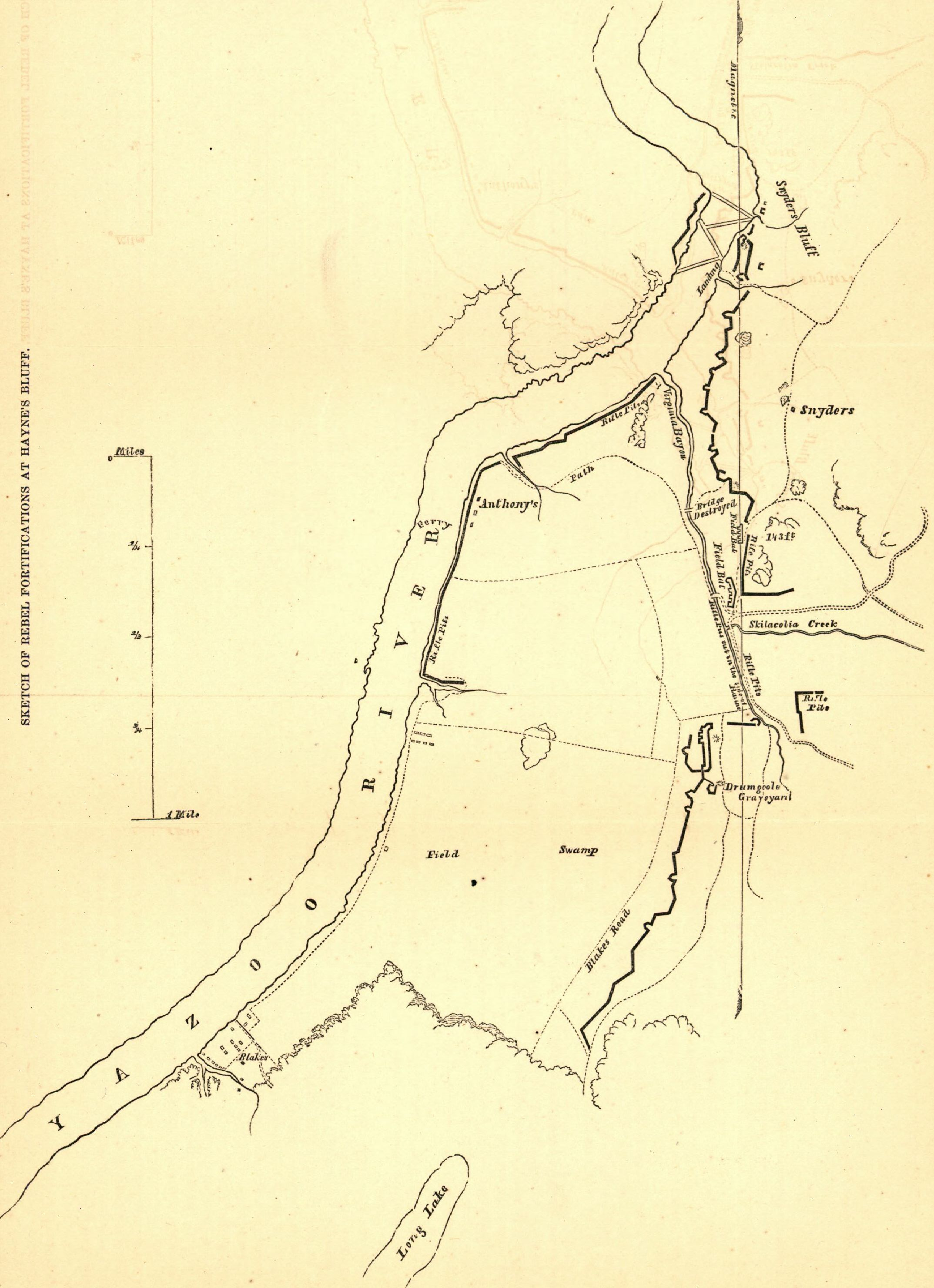
A sketch of the Confederate defenses at Snyder's Bluff and Drumgould's Bluff

Rear Admiral David Dixon Porter delegated responsibility for the naval portion of the operations to Lieutenant Commander K. Randolph Breese. Breese supported the operation, but wanted to wait for the arrival of the ironclad USS Choctaw. Waiting on April 28 for Choctaw to arrive, Major General Francis P. Blair Jr.'s division was issued three days' rations and 60 rounds of ammunition. At about 5:00 pm, Choctaw arrived, and the expedition set off the next morning. Transportation up the Yazoo River was provided by ten troops transports, six of whom had ersatz defensive works made of hay bales on their decks. Those six transports each mounted two cannon, drawn from Battery A, 1st Illinois Light Artillery Regiment and Battery B, 1st Illinois Light Artillery Regiment. The transports were escorted by a group of 11 naval ships: the flagship USS Black Hawk, Choctaw, the ironclad USS Baron DeKalb, the timberclad USS Tyler, the tinclads USS Romeo, USS Linden, USS Signal, and USS Petrel, and three mortar scows.

The vessels reached the junction of Chickasaw Bayou and the Yazoo River on the afternoon of April 29, and stopped for the night, in the vicinity of the old Chickasaw Bayou battlefield. The next morning, the convoy resumed its movement, although Petrel was left behind as a guard, to prevent Confederates from placing naval mines in the river. Firing began at about 10:00 am, when Baron DeKalb and Choctaw opened fire on Confederate positions at Drumgould's Bluff, a bluff located 1 mile (1.6 km) downriver from Snyder's Bluff. Black Hawk and Tyler also opened fire, and the mortar scows positioned themselves and opened fire. Linden guarded the mortar scows, while Romeo and Signal remained in the rear in a supporting position. The Confederate defenses in the area were commanded by Brigadier General Louis Hébert, and contained 16 heavy cannon. Defensive entrenchments were also present at the position. A raft had previously been constructed near Snyder's Bluff to block passage up the river, but it had washed out on April 26.

The Federal ironclads were at a disadvantage, as they could only fire their broadside guns due to ships' positioning. Hébert wanted to prevent the Federals from learning of his positions too quickly, and so he delayed ordering his guns to open fire. Once the Confederates opened fire, the largest guns could only target Choctaw, although some of the other cannon were able to fire at other targets. Tyler was damaged by a shot from a 12-pounder Whitworth rifle and had to withdraw, while Choctaw took 47 hits without serious damage. Some men from the 3rd Louisiana Infantry Regiment attempted to harass Baron DeKalb, but were driven off by a landing party from the vessel. During the artillery bombardment, Federal soldiers landed on shore and attempted to corral cattle, causing a stampede.

The Federal gunboats withdrew, and Hébert found that only two of his men had been wounded during the bombardment, and that the defenses had not suffered serious damage. During the afternoon, some of Blair's men landed. Due to flooding, the infantrymen were only able to advance over the path of a levee. The Federals came under fire from the 3rd Louisiana and Confederate artillery, and were prevented from further advancing. The Federal mock attack had not been convincing, and the Confederates suspected that it might be a demonstration.

On the morning of May 1, Sherman landed the 8th Missouri Infantry Regiment on the west side of the river, but a bayou and Confederate artillery fire from across the river forced them to withdraw. Two other Federal regiments scouted Drumgould's Bluff, and learned that the Confederates had strengthened their positions. Sherman and Breese held a conference, and decided to resume gunboat fire at 3:00 pm. However, Sherman received an urgent message that Grant had written on April 29. The note informed Sherman that the Federals had passed Grand Gulf, and that Sherman needed to put two of his divisions on the move for the campaign. Sherman responded by placing Blair in charge of the Snyder's Bluff operations, ordering one of his divisions to guard the Young's Point, Louisiana, to Richmond, Louisiana, corridor, and mobilizing the other two on the march south.

At around 3:00 pm, Breese had Tyler, Choctaw, and Black Hawk move upriver to shell the Confederate positions, while Baron DeKalb fired from further downstream. Two Confederate guns were knocked out of action, and the Federal fire was more effective. Around dark, the Federals broke off the engagement. Blair's men moved out of the area on transports at around 8:00 pm, and the gunboats followed. Hébert reported that he had suffered no casualties in the day's fighting, while Tyler was the only Federal ship to have been struck during the exchange.

== Aftermath ==
While Sherman later exaggerated the importance of the operation in his memoirs, Bearss writes that "Sherman's activities on the Yazoo made little impression on the Confederates who opposed them". While the Confederates delayed reinforcing Grand Gulf, this would have occurred even without Sherman's feint, largely due to poor performance by Confederate officers Pemberton and Carter L. Stevenson. Confederate officers at the bluff recognized the attack as a demonstration, although Miller writes that "Sherman's presence on the Yazoo did create further confusion about [Federal] intentions". The historians William L. Shea and Terrence J. Winschel write that the Snyder's Bluff demonstration is an example of Grant's commitment to actions designed to distract the Confederates during the campaigns against Vicksburg.

On April 29, Porter's gunboats had bombarded the Confederate positions at Grand Gulf in the Battle of Grand Gulf, but were unable to silence all of the Confederate guns. In response, Grant simply moved his crossing downriver from Grand Gulf to Bruinsburg, Mississippi. On May 1, Grant's lead elements defeated a Confederate force in the Battle of Port Gibson, opening the route to inland Mississippi. Grant changed his approach march to Vicksburg after the Battle of Raymond, moving towards Jackson, Mississippi, and then capturing the city. The defenders of Vicksburg fought Grant east of Vicksburg in the Battle of Champion Hill on May 16, but were defeated. Grant began the Siege of Vicksburg on May 18, and the Confederates surrendered the river town on July 4, marking a major turning point in the war.

== Sources ==
- Ballard, Michael B. (2004). Vicksburg, The Campaign that Opened the Mississippi. Chapel Hill: University of North Carolina Press. ISBN 0-8078-2893-9.
- Bearss, Edwin C. (1991) [1986]. The Campaign for Vicksburg. Vol. II: Grant Strikes a Fatal Blow. Dayton, Ohio: Morningside Bookshop. ISBN 0-89029-313-9.
- Bearss, Edwin C. (1998). "Port Gibson, Mississippi". In Kennedy, Frances H. (ed.). The Civil War Battlefield Guide (2nd ed.). Boston/New York: Houghton Mifflin. pp. 158–164. ISBN 978-0-395-74012-5.
- Bearss, Edwin C. (1998). "Champion Hill, Mississippi". In Kennedy, Frances H. (ed.). The Civil War Battlefield Guide (2nd ed.). Boston/New York: Houghton Mifflin. pp. 167–170. ISBN 978-0-395-74012-5.
- Bearss, Edwin C. (1998). "Battle and Siege of Vicksburg, Mississippi". In Kennedy, Frances H. (ed.). The Civil War Battlefield Guide (2nd ed.). Boston/New York: Houghton Mifflin. pp. 171–173. ISBN 978-0-395-74012-5.
- Kennedy, Frances H., ed. (1998). The Civil War Battlefield Guide (2nd ed.). Boston/New York: Houghton Mifflin. ISBN 978-0-395-74012-5.
- Miller, Donald L. (2019). Vicksburg: Grant's Campaign that Broke the Confederacy. New York, New York: Simon and Schuster. ISBN 978-1-4516-4139-4.
- Shea, William L.; Winschel, Terrence J. (2003). Vicksburg Is the Key: The Struggle for the Mississippi River. Lincoln, Nebraska: University of Nebraska Press. ISBN 978-0-8032-9344-1.
- Winschel, Terrence J. (1998). "Chickasaw Bayou, Mississippi". In Kennedy, Frances H. (ed.). The Civil War Battlefield Guide (2nd ed.). Boston/New York: Houghton Mifflin. pp. 154–156. ISBN 978-0-395-74012-5.
