= USS Abeona =

Gunboat of the United States Navy

History

United States
- Name: Abeona
- Namesake: Abeona
- Launched: 1831
- Acquired: by purchase, 21 December 1864
- Commissioned: 10 April 1865
- Decommissioned: 4 August 1865
- Fate: Sold, 11 August 1865; Burned, 7 March 1872

General characteristics
- Type: Steam gunboat
- Displacement: 206 long tons (209 t)
- Length: 157 ft (48 m)
- Beam: 31 ft (9.4 m)
- Depth of hold: 4 ft (1.2 m)
- Propulsion: Steam engine
- Speed: 8 kn (9.2 mph; 15 km/h)
- Armament: 2 × 30-pounder (4.2 in (107 mm)) Parrott rifles; 2 × 74-pounder smoothbore guns; 2 × 12-pounder rifled guns

USS Abeona was a mercantile stern wheel steamer that traded on the Mississippi between 1831 and her destruction by fire in 1872, except for two years, between 1863 and 1865, when she served the United States Navy as a gunboat.

== Construction and commissioning ==
Abeona was built in 1831, at Pittsburgh, Pennsylvania, and the US Navy purchased her on 21 December 1864, at Cincinnati, Ohio. The navy converted her to a "tinclad" gunboat at Mound City, Illinois, and commissioned her there on 10 April 1865, (one day after the surrender of General Robert E. Lee).

== Service history ==
Abeona performed patrol and guard duty on the Mississippi River, and its tributaries — primarily in the Mississippi River Squadron's 5th (the Mississippi, between Natchez and Vicksburg) and 10th (the Cumberland River and upper Ohio River) Districts. After all organized Confederate resistance ceased and the South had begun its painful and uncertain return to a peaceful way of life, Abeona was decommissioned at Mound City, 4 August 1865.

She was sold there on 11 August 1865, to J. A. Williamson, et al., and was registered under the same name on 17 October 1865. The veteran stern wheeler operated on the Mississippi, and its branches, until she caught fire at Cincinnati, 7 March 1872, and was destroyed.

As of 2004, no other ships in the United States Navy have borne this name.

== Bibliography ==
- Mooney, James L. (8 February 2016). "Abeona (Tinclad Gunboat) 1865". Dictionary of American Naval Fighting Ships. Naval History and Heritage Command. This article incorporates text from this source, which is in the public domain.
