= USS Ibex (1863) =

History

United States
- Name: USS Ibex
- Ordered: as Ohio Valley
- Laid down: date unknown
- Launched: 1863
- Acquired: 10 December 1864
- Commissioned: 4 April 1865
- Decommissioned: 5 August 1865
- Renamed: 5 October 1865
- Stricken: 1865 (est.)
- Fate: Sold, 17 August 1865

General characteristics
- Displacement: 235 tons
- Length: 157 ft (48 m)
- Beam: 33 ft (10 m)
- Draught: 4 ft 6 in (1.37 m)
- Propulsion: steam engine; side wheel-propelled
- Armament: two 30-pounder Parrott rifles; two 12-pounder rifles; four 24-pounder howitzers
- Armour: tinclad

USS Ibex was a steamer acquired by the Union Navy during the American Civil War. She was to be used as a gunboat by the Navy, although the war ended less than a week (9 April 1865) after she was commissioned.

Ibex, a tinclad, side-wheel gunboat formerly called Ohio Valley, was built at Harmar, Ohio, in 1863 and was purchased by the Navy at Cincinnati, Ohio, from Theodore Johnson on 10 December 1864. It was commissioned at Mound City, Illinois on 4 April 1865, Lt. Comdr. R. L. May in command.

After being fitted as a gunboat at Mound City, Ibex was ordered to Memphis, Tennessee, for duty with the Mississippi Squadron's 8th District on 29 April 1865. She served faithfully in the Mississippi River assisting Rear Admiral Samuel Phillips Lee in attending to many of the tasks entailed in closing the Mississippi Squadron.

Ibex was decommissioned at Mound City on 5 August, and was sold at public auction to Thompson Dean on 17 August 1865. She was redocumented as Harry Dean on 5 October 1865. The ship was lost when she exploded at Gallipolis, Ohio on 3 January 1868.
