= Bolivar, Mississippi =

- Census-designated place
- Location within the U.S. state of Mississippi
- Coordinates: 33°39′38″N 91°03′07″W
- Country: United States
- State: Mississippi
- County: Bolivar
- Founded: December 12, 1835 (190 years ago)
- Named for: Simón Bolívar

Area
  - Total: 0.25 sq mi (0.65 km^{2})
  - Land: 0.25 sq mi (0.65 km^{2})
  - Water: 0 sq mi (0.00 km^{2})
- Elevation: 141 ft (43 m)

Population (2020)
  - Total: 39
  - Density: 156.2/sq mi (60.32/km^{2})
- Time zone: UTC-6 (Central (CST))
  - Summer (DST): UTC-5 (CDT)
- ZIP code: 38725
- GNIS feature ID: 2812715

Bolivar is a census-designated place (CDP) and unincorporated community in Bolivar County, Mississippi, United States.

Bolivar was once the county seat, and Bolivar Landing was its port on the Mississippi River. Now permanently cut off from the river, Bolivar is a quiescent residential hamlet, while Bolivar Landing, immediately north and across the immense Mississippi Levee, is a cottage community on Lake Whittington. Per the 2020 Census, the population was 39.

== History ==
Founded on December 12, 1835, a U.S. post office operated under the name Bolivar until 1908.

When Bolivar County was established on December 12, 1835, the first county seat was located at Bolivar. William Vick sold 5 acres (2.0 ha) of land to the county for $800, and it was then named Bolivar. The land was surveyed by B.M. Hines, who laid out the courthouse square, with town lots around it which were advertised for sale. An order was passed by the Board of Police (later called "supervisors") in 1840 to build a one-room courthouse at a cost of $595.

In 1844, the Board of Police ordered that the county seat be moved to a location north of present-day Beulah. Soon after, the county seat was moved to Prentiss, where a courthouse was erected. After the near-destruction of Prentiss during the Civil War, the courthouse was placed on a flat-boat and carried down the river to Bolivar Landing.

Trusten Polk, a former U.S. Senator and Governor of Missouri, was captured by Union forces at Bolivar Landing in 1863, along with his wife and two daughters. In 1864, Union forces carried away cargo from Bolivar Landing, and set fire to several houses. Also in 1864, Confederate soldiers burned the USS Collier near Bolivar Landing, though the ship was not destroyed.

In 1874, high waters on the Mississippi River broke a levee at Bolivar Landing, forming a crevasse 1,900 ft (580 m) wide.

The U.S. Army Corps of Engineers completed the Caulk Island Cutoff in 1937, which diverted the course of the Mississippi River to enable a more direct route for shipping. This diversion removed Bolivar Landing from contiguous access to the Mississippi River (except for a small channel for recreational boats), and created Lake Whittington, an oxbow lake.

== Demographics ==
Historical population
Census	Pop.	Note	%±
2020	39		—
U.S. Decennial Census; 2020

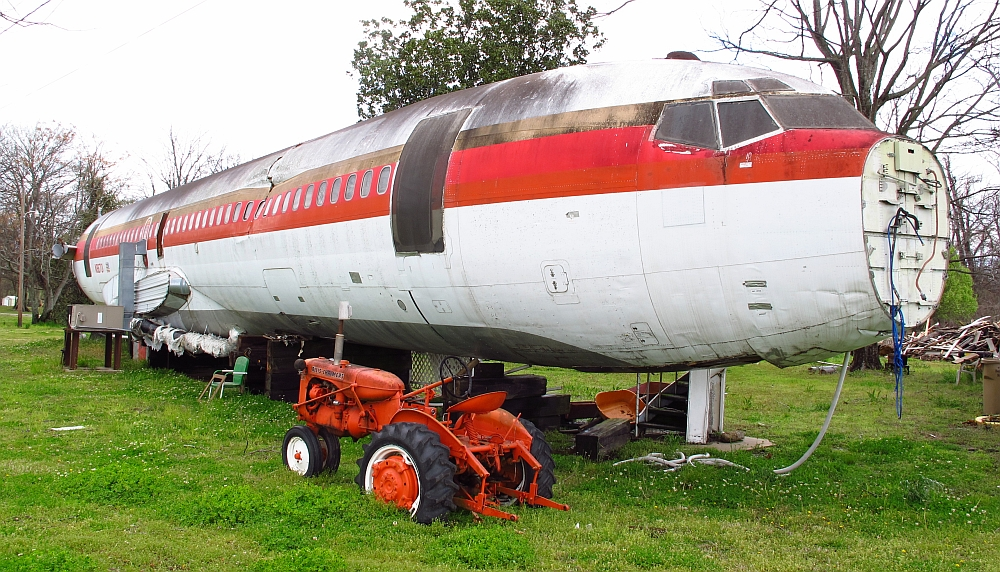
Airplane house in Bolivar.

Bolivar was first listed as a census designated place in the 2020 U.S. census.

=== 2020 census ===
Bolivar CDP, Mississippi – Racial and ethnic composition Note: the US Census treats Hispanic/Latino as an ethnic category. This table excludes Latinos from the racial categories and assigns them to a separate category. Hispanics/Latinos may be of any race.
Race / Ethnicity (NH = Non-Hispanic)	Pop 2020	% 2020
White alone (NH)	4	10.26%
Black or African American alone (NH)	28	71.79%
Native American or Alaska Native alone (NH)	0	0.00%
Asian alone (NH)	0	0.00%
Native Hawaiian or Pacific Islander alone (NH)	0	0.00%
Other race alone (NH)	0	0.00%
Mixed race or Multiracial (NH)	4	10.26%
Hispanic or Latino (any race)	3	7.69%
Total	39	100.00%

== In popular culture ==
Mark Twain mentioned Bolivar Landing in his parody "River Intelligence", published in the New Orleans Crescent in 1859. The fictional river captain Sergeant Fathom states: "When me and DeSoto discovered the Mississippi, I could stand at Bolivar Landing (several miles above "Roaring Waters Bar") and pitch a biscuit to the main shore on the other side."
