= Airplane house =

House built out of a retired airplane

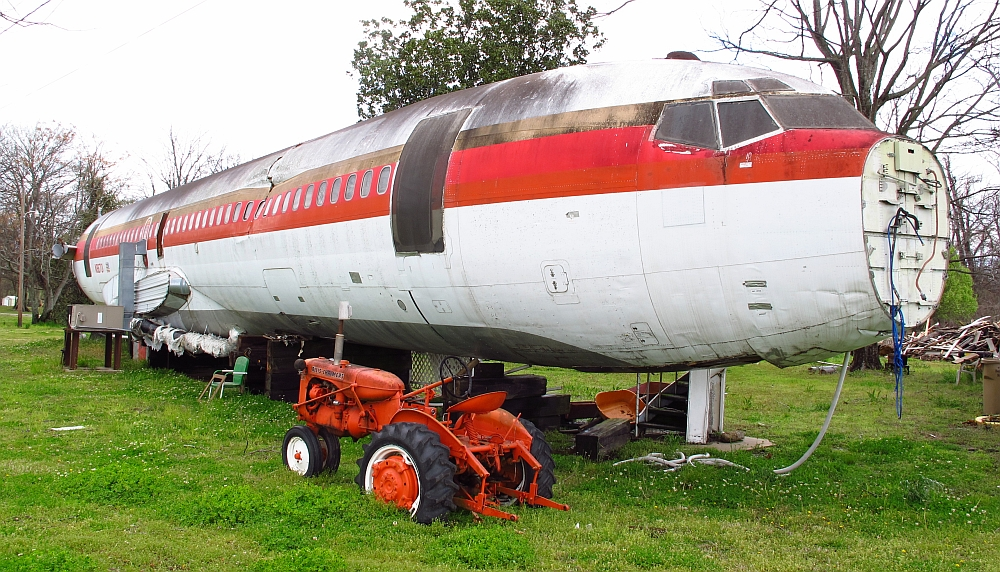
An airplane house in Bolivar, Mississippi

An airplane house or aeroplane house is a residential home made from a retired or scrapped aircraft. The houses are usually old airliners that once carried passengers, but have now been sent to a scrap yard because of age or because of cuts in the airline's fleet.

== Construction and use ==
People buy the airplane from the scrap yard and use the frame as a base for a house. Lighting, heating, air conditioning, and plumbing can be converted once the plane is transported to its final destination from the scrap yard. The plane houses often have the cockpit and back of the plane turned into either a bedroom or bathroom. There is usually a room in the middle which is another bedroom. The remaining area can be turned into a living room and kitchen. The cargo hold underneath, normally used to carry customer luggage, is available to use as an attic-type storage area.

== Houses ==
Airplane houses exist in Costa Rica, Indonesia, Cambodia, and the United States, among other places.

Beautician Jo Ann Ussery created her own airplane house in 1995, which she remained in until 1999. This has been cited as an inspiration for further airplane houses.

Notable airplane houses include the 747 Wing House, which is made only from the plane's wings.

In a 2005 episode of the television show Monster House, half of a Boeing 727 was placed in the backyard of a house in Southern California and converted to a recreation room.

== See also ==
- Aircraft boneyard — storage area for aircraft retired from service
- Airplane Bungalow — early 20th century house style in the United States
- Adaptive reuse — conversion of an existing building for a new purpose
- Converted barn and barndominium — farming barns converted to homes
