= USS Carrabasset (1864) =

Gunboat of the United States Navy

History

United States
- Acquired: 23 January 1864
- Commissioned: 12 May 1864
- Decommissioned: 25 July 1865
- Fate: Sold, 12 August 1865

General characteristics
- Displacement: 202 tons
- Length: 155 ft (47 m)
- Beam: 31 ft 7 in (9.63 m)
- Draft: 4 ft 7 in (1.40 m)
- Propulsion: steam engine; Side wheel-propelled
- Complement: 45
- Armament: two 32-pounder guns; four 24-pounder smoothbores

USS Carrabasset was a steamer acquired by the Union Navy during the American Civil War.

She supported the blockade of the Confederate States of America in a variety of ways: as a tugboat, a gunboat, and as a transport, depending on the need at the time.

== Service history ==
Carrabasset, a side-wheel steamer, was purchased at Cincinnati, Ohio, 23 January 1864; commissioned at New Orleans, Louisiana, 12 May 1864 and reported to the West Gulf Blockading Squadron. With the Squadron, Carrabasset operated as transport, picket boat, and tugboat at the mouth of the Mississippi River, in Berwick Bay and the Atchafalaya River, and in the neighboring lakes and bayous. On several occasions she landed Union Army forces or her own landing party to engage Confederate forces ashore, capturing men, horses, and bales of cotton. One such incident occurred 21 March 1865, when she landed 40 infantrymen, then was attacked herself by a party of Confederates. Putting a party of her own men ashore, Carrabasset succeeded in capturing the equipment of a Confederate picket and several pirogues.

On 17 June 1865, one of her landing party expeditions penetrated to St. Martinville, Louisiana, where the equipment of three lighthouses, stored there since the taking of the lighthouses by the Confederates early in the war, was recaptured. Carrabasset was decommissioned 25 July 1865 at New Orleans, and sold there 12 August 1865.
