= USS General Pillow =

Gunboat of the United States Navy

History

United States
- Commissioned: 23 August 1862
- Decommissioned: July 1865
- Captured: 9 June 1862
- Fate: Sold, 26 November 1865

General characteristics
- Displacement: 38 tons
- Length: 81 ft 5 in (24.82 m)
- Beam: 17 ft 1 in (5.21 m)
- Draft: 3 ft 8 in (1.12 m)
- Propulsion: steam engine; side-wheel propelled
- Armament: two 12-pounder howitzers

USS General Pillow was a gunboat captured by the Union Navy during the American Civil War and placed into service with the Union Navy. She served the Union cause from 1862 until the end of war in 1865. It was named for General Gideon Pillow.

== Service history ==
General Pillow (Gunboat No. 20) was originally Confederate steamer B. M. Moore and served the South as a gunboat until she was captured on the Hatchee River, Tennessee, by USS Pittsburgh 9 June 1862. She was transferred to the Union Navy by the War Department; and after outfitting and repairs at Cairo, Illinois., General Pillow departed Cairo 23 August for duty with the Mississippi Squadron, Lt. LeRoy Fitch in command. General Pillow became part of the light draft squadron on the Tennessee River and the Cumberland River, and for the next several months convoyed troop transports and fought guerrillas on the riverbanks. February 1863 saw her again at Cairo guarding mortar ships and ammunition barges, in addition to making occasional visits to Mound City, Illinois, and the mouth of the Tennessee River. She continued this duty until July 1865 when she was turned over to the Commandant of the Naval Station, Mound City, for disposal. General Pillow was sold at Mound City 26 November 1865 to Wetzel and Hallerburg.
