= USS Oriole (1864) =

Gunboat of the United States Navy

History

United States
- Name: USS Oriole
- Acquired: 7 December 1864
- Commissioned: 22 March 1865
- Decommissioned: 4 August 1865
- Fate: Sold, 17 August 1865

General characteristics
- Type: Gunboat
- Displacement: 137 long tons (139 t)
- Length: 125 ft (38 m)
- Beam: 26 ft 5 in (8.05 m)
- Draft: 6 ft 3 in (1.91 m)
- Depth of hold: 7 ft 7 in (2.31 m)
- Propulsion: Steam engine, stern wheel
- Armament: 2 × 30-pounder Parrott rifles; 1 × 12-pounder rifle; 6 × 24-pounder guns

The first USS Oriole was a sternwheel river steamship in the Union Navy. She was named after the bird, the oriole.

Oriole was acquired as the Florence Miller from John Swassey & Co. at Cincinnati, Ohio on 7 December 1864; converted to a sternwheel gunboat by Mr. Joseph Brown at Mound City, Illinois; and commissioned as Oriole on 22 March 1865, Acting Master Edward Alford in command.

Assigned to the Mississippi River Squadron on 3 February 1865 while still named Florence Miller, Oriole departed Mound City on 22 March for service in the 5th Naval District under Lt. Comdr. E. Y. McCauley.

She performed blockade duties on the Mississippi River from Natchez to Vicksburg, until General Robert E. Lee's surrender to General Ulysses S. Grant at Appomattox, Virginia on 9 April. The gunboat was retained in the Mississippi Squadron for towing and patrol duties through July 1865.

On 4 August Oriole decommissioned at Mound City and was later sold there to Mr. Thomas Scott on 17 August 1865.

== See also ==
- Anaconda Plan
