= USS Collier =

Gunboat of the United States Navy

History

United States
- Name: USS Collier
- Launched: 1864
- Acquired: by purchase, 7 December 1864
- Commissioned: 18 March 1865
- Decommissioned: 29 July 1865
- Fate: Sold, 1865

General characteristics
- Type: Gunboat
- Tonnage: 177 long tons (180 t)
- Length: 158 ft (48 m)
- Beam: 30 ft (9.1 m)
- Propulsion: Steam engine; Stern-wheel
- Armament: 1 × 12-pounder (5 kg) gun; 2 × 20-pounder (9 kg) guns; 6 × 24-pounder (11 kg) howitzers

USS Collier was a stern wheel steamer built at Cincinnati, Ohio, in 1864 as the Allen Collier and purchased by the United States Navy on 7 December of that year.

The ship was commissioned as the USS Allen Collier on 18 March 1865 and renamed to be USS Collier soon thereafter. Navy records occasionally continued to refer to the ship by her original name, Allen Collier and more frequently by a name which she never carried officially: A. Collier.

Collier patrolled the Mississippi River until the end of the American Civil War. She was decommissioned on 29 July 1865 and sold into civilian service later that year.
