= USS Exchange =

Gunboat of the United States Navy

History

United States
- Laid down: date unknown
- Launched: 1862
- Acquired: 6 April 1863
- Commissioned: circa May 1863
- Decommissioned: 6 August 1865
- Stricken: 1865 (est.)
- Fate: Sold, 17 August 1865

General characteristics
- Displacement: 211 tons
- Length: 155 ft 3 in (47.32 m)
- Beam: 33 ft 5 in (10.19 m)
- Draught: 6 ft (1.8 m)
- Propulsion: steam engine; stern wheel-propelled
- Speed: 6 mph
- Complement: 81
- Armament: two 32-pounder guns; four 24-pounder howitzers; one 12-pounder gun

USS Exchange was a steamer acquired by the Union Navy during the American Civil War.

She was used by the Union Navy as a gunboat in support of the Union Navy blockade of Confederate waterways. After the war's end, she was assigned as an ammunition ship, to carry ordnance where needed.

== Built in Pennsylvania in 1862 ==
Exchange, a stern wheel gunboat, was built in 1862 at Brownsville, Pennsylvania; purchased by the Navy on 6 April 1863; and early in June 1863 joined the Mississippi Squadron, Acting Volunteer Lieutenant J. S. Kurd in command.

== Civil War service ==
=== Patrolling the Tennessee and Mississippi Rivers ===
Through the summer of 1863, Exchange patrolled the Tennessee River, harassing the enemy by destroying boats and sending landing parties ashore, frequently taking prisoners. Early in September, she stood down the Mississippi River to Memphis, Tennessee, and through the remainder of the war, patrolled the Mississippi River and its tributaries, convoying Union Army transports, shelling enemy shore batteries, and bringing her firepower to bear in repelling guerrilla attacks on Union camps.

=== Commended by Admiral Porter for gallant conduct in battle ===
Exchange joined in the expedition up the Yazoo River in February 1864 to facilitate the march on Meridian, Mississippi, and captured 632 bales of cotton belonging to the Confederate Army. On 1 June, during a 45-minute engagement with a masked battery at Columbia, Arkansas, the gunboat was struck 35 times, with 8 shots piercing her hull. One man was killed, and her commanding officer wounded. The gallant conduct of her crew in this action won commendation from Rear Admiral David Dixon Porter.

== Post-war service and disposal ==
Exchange towed and carried ordnance stores to Jefferson Barracks, Missouri, after the war, until decommissioned at Mound City, Illinois, on 6 August 1865. She was sold on 17 August 1865.
