= Columbia, Arkansas =

Former populated place, Chicot County seat (1833–1855)

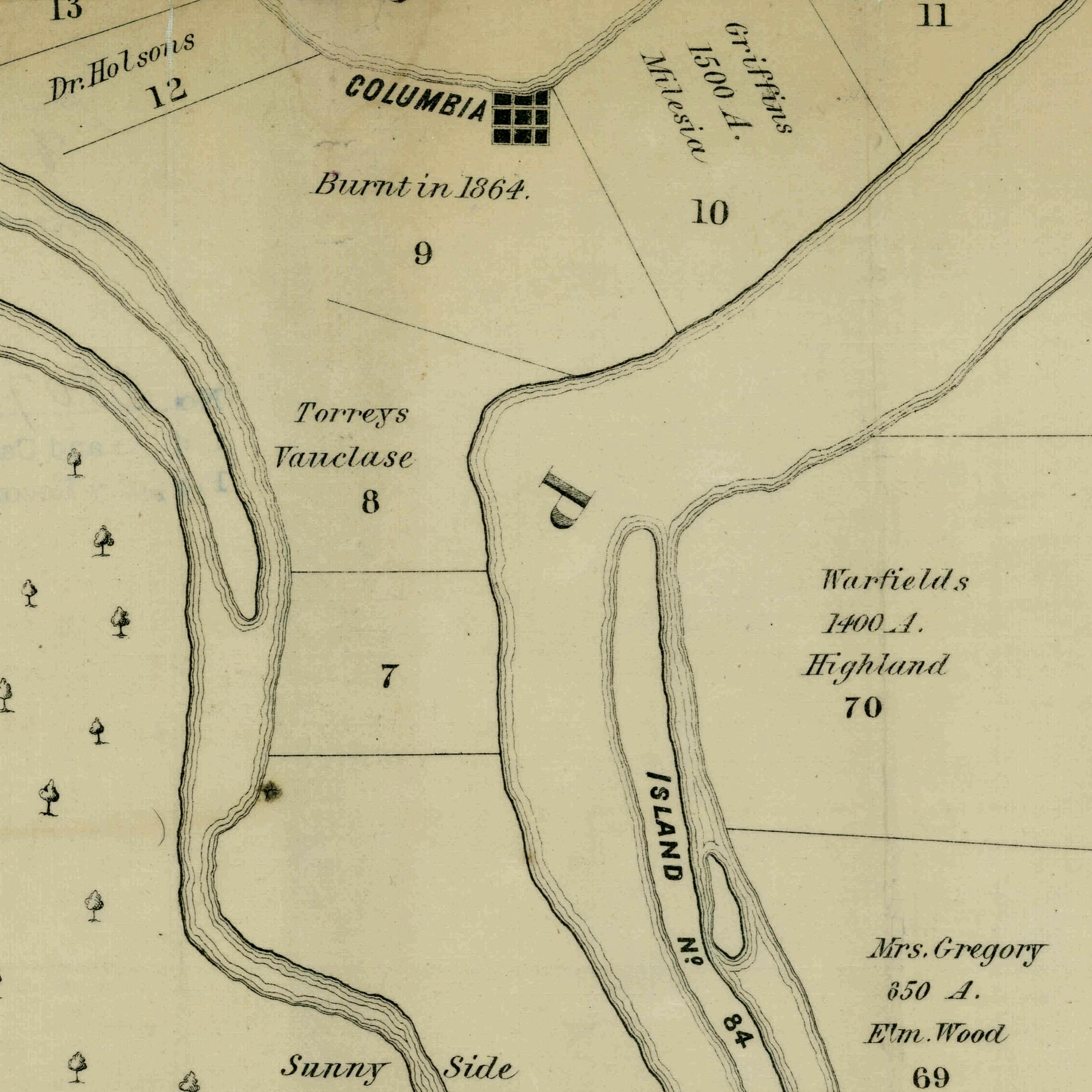
Excerpt of map showing former location of Columbia, Arkansas, with note "burned in 1864"

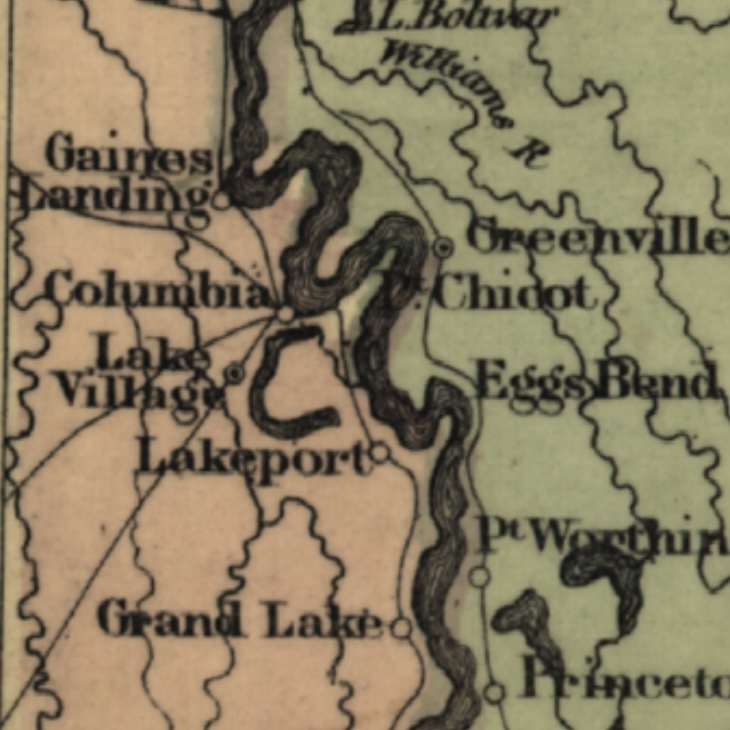
Columbia, Arkansas, and environs, 1862

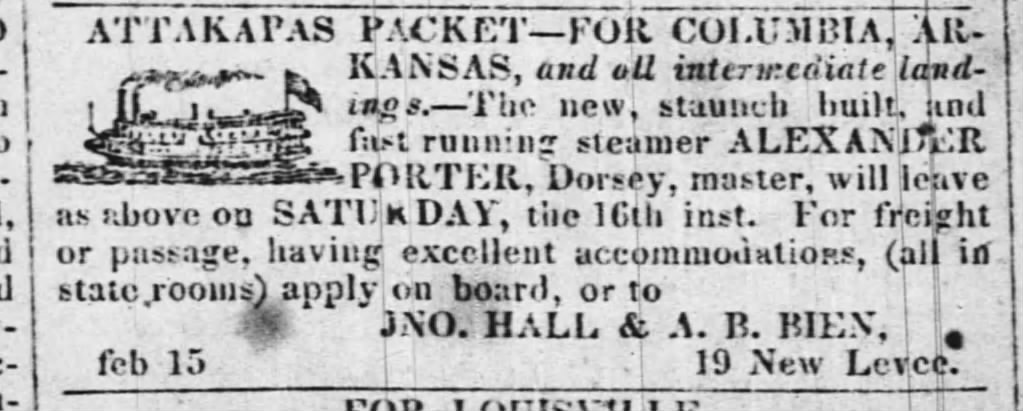
"Attapakas Packet" New Orleans Times-Picayune, February 16, 1839

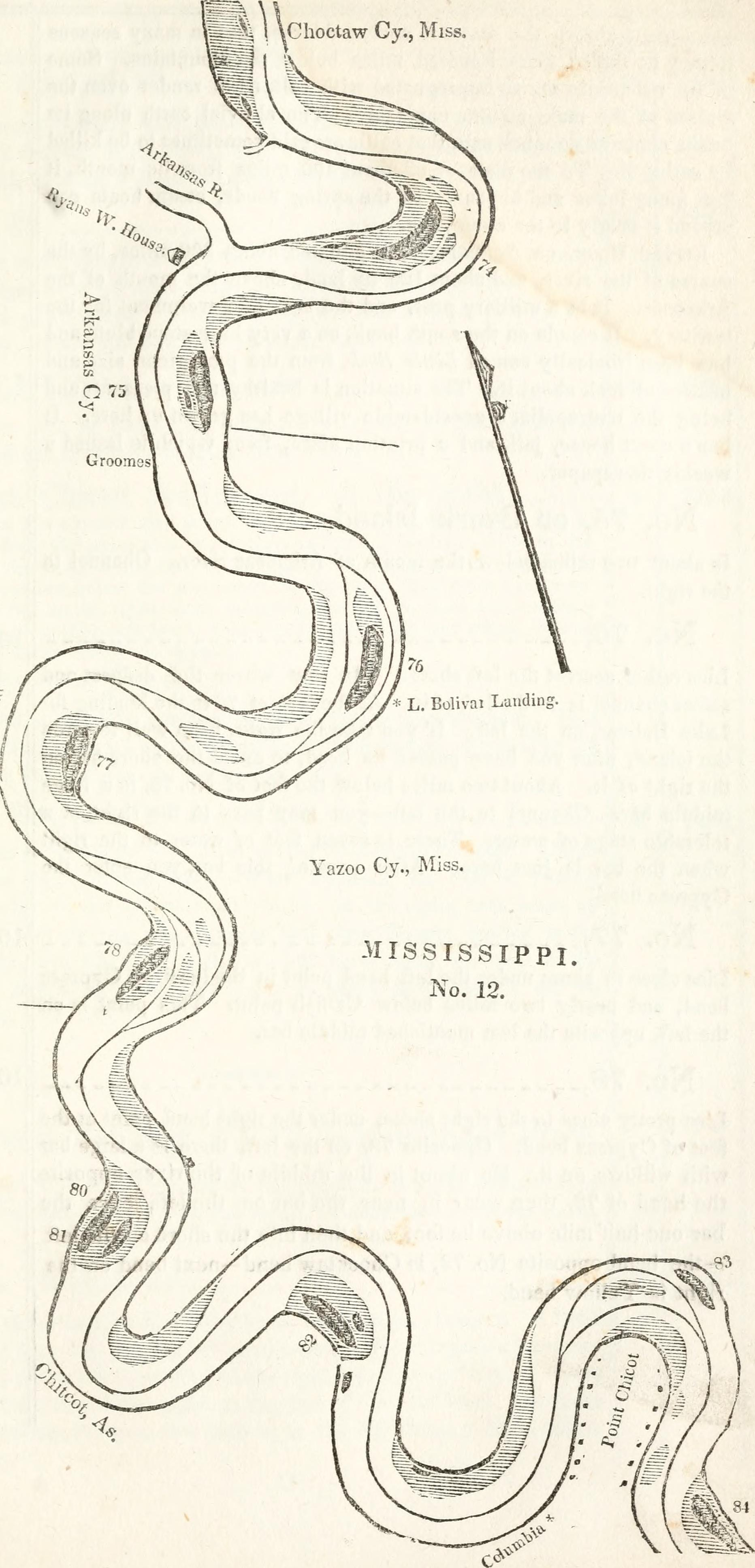
Columbia, as mapped in The Western Pilot (1848)

Columbia, Arkansas was a 19th-century boat landing and human settlement along the Mississippi River located in Chicot County near Helena, Arkansas. Columbia stood on what was called Spanish Moss Bend, in a section of the River known as the Greenville Bends, between Gaines' Landing and Island 82. Columbia, which lay roughly opposite Greenville, Mississippi, was the county seat of Chicot from 1833 until 1855.

The population was 400 in 1860. Cotton from nearby plantations was shipped from the river landing. The Columbia and Bartholomew Railroad Company was incorporated in 1838, but only parts of the railroad would be completed. Also in 1838, one of four branch offices of Arkansas Real Estate Bank was established in Columbia. After accumulating over a million dollars in investments, the bank failed in 1842, created widespread financial difficulties.

The outlaw band of John Murrell was said to spend time in the settlement, helping earn the port a rough reputation. On July 4, 1846, an enslaved man known only as William was lynched at Columbia.

Three major steamboat disasters occurred near Columbia. On June 9, 1836, the Rob Roy suffered a fatal boiler explosion that killed at least 17 people. On January 6, 1853, the J. Wilson exploded shortly after departing Columbia, resulting in dozens of deaths. And on May 19, 1861, a boiler explosion on Kentucky killed 19.

USS Exchange was damaged by Confederate artillery near Columbia in June 1864. The settlement was "burned in retaliation" for attacks on U.S. Navy gunboats during the American Civil War. It is believed that the remains of the town site were eventually eroded into the Mississippi. Nothing remains of the settlement today.

== See also ==
- Gaines Landing, Arkansas
- Skipwith's Landing, Mississippi
- Mississippi River in the American Civil War
