= USS Juliet =

Gunboat of the United States Navy

History

United States
- Launched: 1862
- Acquired: 1 November 1862
- Commissioned: 14 December 1862
- Decommissioned: 30 June 1865
- Fate: Sold, 17 August 1865

General characteristics
- Tonnage: 157
- Length: 155 ft 6 in (47.40 m)
- Beam: 30 ft 2 in (9.19 m)
- Draft: 5 ft (1.5 m)
- Propulsion: steam engine; stern wheel-propelled
- Speed: 4 knots (7.4 km/h; 4.6 mph)
- Armament: six 24-pounder howitzers

USS Juliet was a steamer acquired by the Union Navy during the American Civil War. She was used by the Union Navy as a gunboat in support of the Union Navy blockade of Confederate waterways.

== Service history ==
Juliet was built at Brownsville, Pennsylvania, in 1862 and purchased by the Navy at Cincinnati, Ohio, 1 November 1862. After receiving armorplate protection, she commissioned 14 December, Acting Volunteer Lieutenant Edward Shaw in command. Assigned to the Mississippi Squadron and ordered to the vicinity of Vicksburg, Mississippi, Juliet helped clear the Yazoo River of torpedoes (mines) 23 December in preparation for General William Tecumseh Sherman's valiant but unsuccessful attack on the Chickasaw Bluffs, which protected Vicksburg. She remained in the Yazoo River until 2 January 1863 when she followed the transports and other gunboats downstream, covering their withdrawal to the Mississippi River.

On 6 January Rear Admiral David Dixon Porter assigned Juliet to 1st Division of Light Draft Gunboats where she served the Mississippi Squadron as an escort vessel maintaining communications along the river and protecting the vital flow of shipping which sustained military and naval strength throughout the campaigns and cut the Confederacy in two with the fall of Vicksburg and Port Hudson.

The most dangerous service during the faithful tinclads’ career came during the Red River Expedition. Admiral Porter's gunboats, in cooperation with General Banks, had ascended the Red River in an effort to replant the United States flag on Texas soil as a check against French interference in Mexico and to encourage the re-establishment of loyal state governments in Louisiana and Arkansas. While the Union ships were at Springfield Landing making preparations to clear away the sunken hulk of an old steamer which had stopped their progress toward Shreveport, Louisiana, a messenger arrived with word that General Banks had suffered a severe defeat near Mansfield and was falling back to Grand Ecore. Reluctantly Porter ordered the gunboats to reverse course.

During the passage down, the Northern gunboats were severely punished by fire from Confederate shore batteries. On 26 and 27 April Juliet again and again fought off cannon and musketry, suffering 16 casualties including 2 killed and heavy damage to the ship. Skillful repair work under the most trying conditions kept the vessel afloat and finally enabled her to pass the batteries. After repairs at Cairo, Illinois, Juliet recommissioned 6 September and returned to duty with the Mississippi squadron, serving as an escort and patrol vessel.

After the end of the war, Juliet decommissioned at Mound City, Illinois, 30 June 1865, and was sold at public auction there to Philip Wallach 17 August 1865. Redocumented Goldina (or Goldena) that day, she was stranded 31 December 1865 on the White River Cutoff between the Arkansas River and the White River in Arkansas and abandoned.
