= Gaines Landing, Arkansas =

Extinct settlement, Chicot County

Gaines Landing (also Gaines' Landing and Gaines's Landing) is an extinct settlement in Chicot County, Arkansas, United States that once hosted a boat landing along the Mississippi River. The location played a role in the story of fugitive slave Margaret Garner (whose life was the basis of Toni Morrison's Beloved), and was used for troop movements during the American Civil War.

== History ==
Gaines Landing was named for the Gaines family of Kentucky, specifically brothers William H. Gaines, Richard M. Gaines, and Benjamin P. Gaines. Benjamin Gaines, and his wife Matilda Fox first settled there in August 1824, the same year they got married. The first Episcopal Mission service west of the Mississippi was reportedly held at Gaines Landing. Chicot County's major product was cotton. A settler who arrived and built a cabin at the place in 1834 later told, "He was almost as far (seemingly) from civilization as Robinson Crusoe, for there were no roads at all, only an occasional trail made by the cattle wandering through the woods. In 1838 he sold cord-wood to the steamboats, and carried on a general merchandise business." The landing ultimately became one of the major Mississippi River ports between Helena, Arkansas and Vicksburg, Mississippi, where local planters could debark new slaves and supplies for their farms, and send cotton bales out for export to mills in New England and Great Britain.

In the 1850s Gaines Landing received regular mail from the packet boats and was the starting point of a mail route to inland Arkansas. Circa 1852 there was a plank road from Gaines Landing to Bradley County, Arkansas. The first toll gate was four miles west of Gaines Landing. There were plans for a Gaines Landing Railroad in 1853; Lloyd Tilghman was hired to be the chief engineer for the survey. The steamboat E. Howard sank near Gaines Landing in 1858. William Gaines transported an enslaved man named R. D. Green, a native of Caroline County, Virginia, to Gaines' Landing in 1858 after purchasing him from Richmond slave trader Solomon Davis.

During the 1850s, according to a planter named Charles McDermott, "Chicot County...had quite a number of Murrellites—men who lived by plunder, murder, gambling, and theft. About eight of them lived near old man Fulton's house above Gaines' Landing. They would steal a horse or a Negro. Once they got into a quarrel with one of their own members, a man named McReynolds. Seven of them came to his place and killed him with a gun. The name of this band were Fulton, Cooper, Johns, and James Forsythe." The next settlement after Gaines Landing was at Dermott, "named for members of the McDermott family who settled here in 1832. Charles McDermott's house was an overnight stopping point for westward travelers who crossed the Mississippi at Gaines' Landing. Slaves brought water in cedar tubs for the guests."

In 1856, some 30 years after the first Gaines settled at Gaines Landing, recaptured fugitive slave Margaret Garner was being shipped from Kentucky to Gaines' Landing by her legal owner Archibald K. Gaines (brother to the brothers above) when a boat collision killed her baby. She was later returned to Kentucky and then shipped south a second time, where she was kept for a time at Benjamin Gaines' plantation and then shipped further south to still another brother, Abner LeGrand Gaines, a cotton broker and planter who had property in Issaquena County and near Natchez, Mississippi.

According to the Encyclopedia of Arkansas, "During the American Civil War, Gaines' Landing was one of many points along the river used by Confederate troops to harass Federal steamboats. Long bends of the river were ideal for the Confederates' hit-and-run tactics: they could attack a boat as it entered the bend and then race across the narrow neck of land to attack it again as it came out of the bend; this was particularly effective when boats were moving slowly upstream." Samuel Curtis wrote to Henry Halleck in July 1862 that Gaines Landing was used for shipping arms and artillery to Confederate guerrillas harassing Union boats in the Greenville Bends and beyond. There were skirmishes at Gaines Landing in June 1862; on July 20, 1862; on December 23, 1862; on June 15–16, 1863; on June 27–28, 1863; and in May 1864. William T. Sherman landed a division at Gaines Landing on December 24, 1862, and burned and pillaged the surrounding area in retaliation. When Tennessee's Confederate Governor Isham G. Harris fled west at the end of the war, he crossed the Mississippi near Gaines Landing.

There was still a post office at Gaines Landing in 1923. The post office was discontinued in 1932, and services moved to the post office of Lake Village, Arkansas. The settlement lost river access with the creation of the Ashbrook Cutoff of Rowdy Bend in 1935 and nothing remains of it today.

== Geography ==
The elevation of Gaines Landing was 130 ft (40 m) above sea level.

== See also ==
- Columbia, Arkansas
- Milliken's Bend, Louisiana
- Mississippi River in the American Civil War
- Abner Gaines House (Kentucky)

== Gallery ==
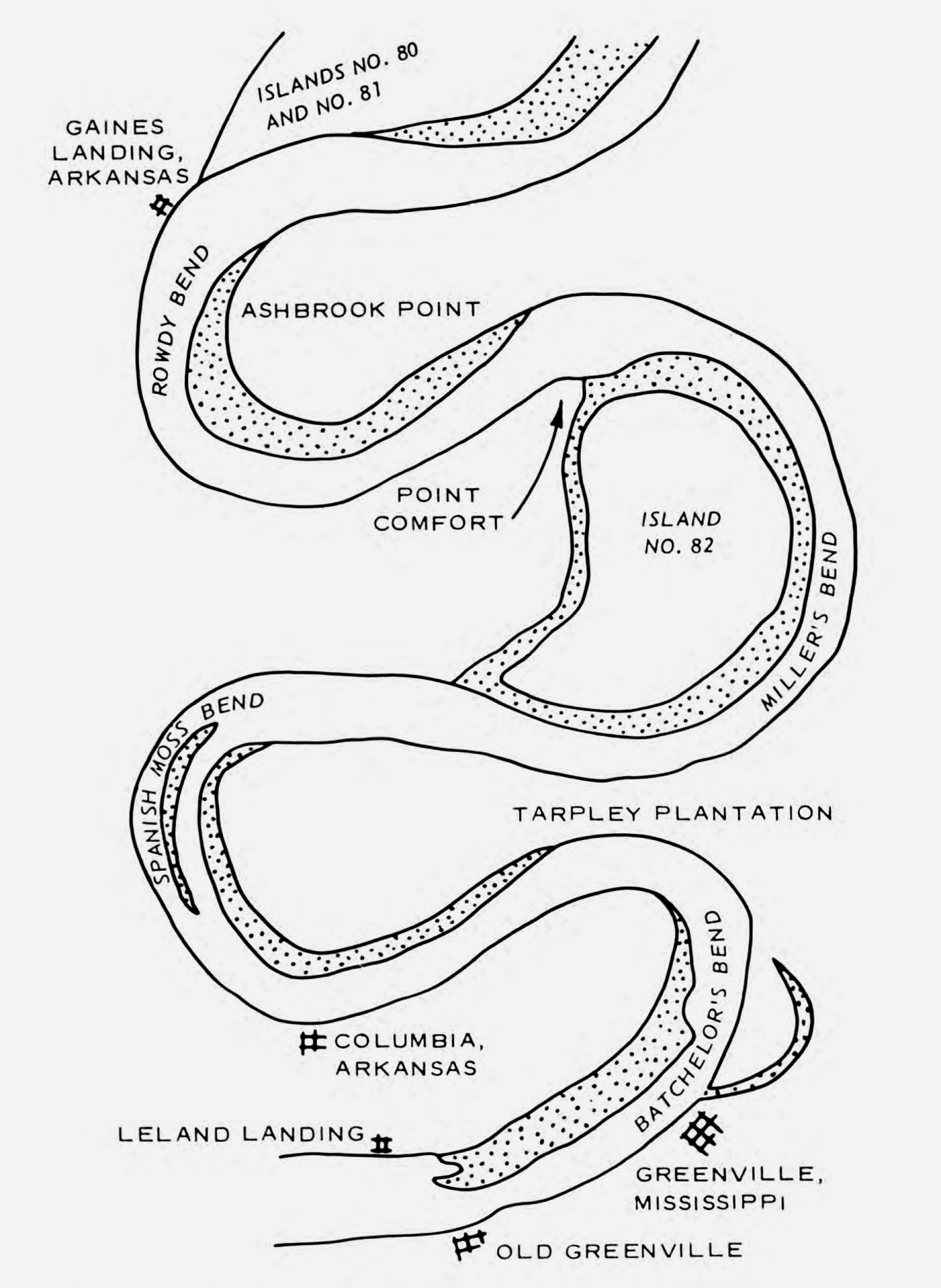
Gaines Landing was on a stretch of the Mississippi River known as the Greenville Bends

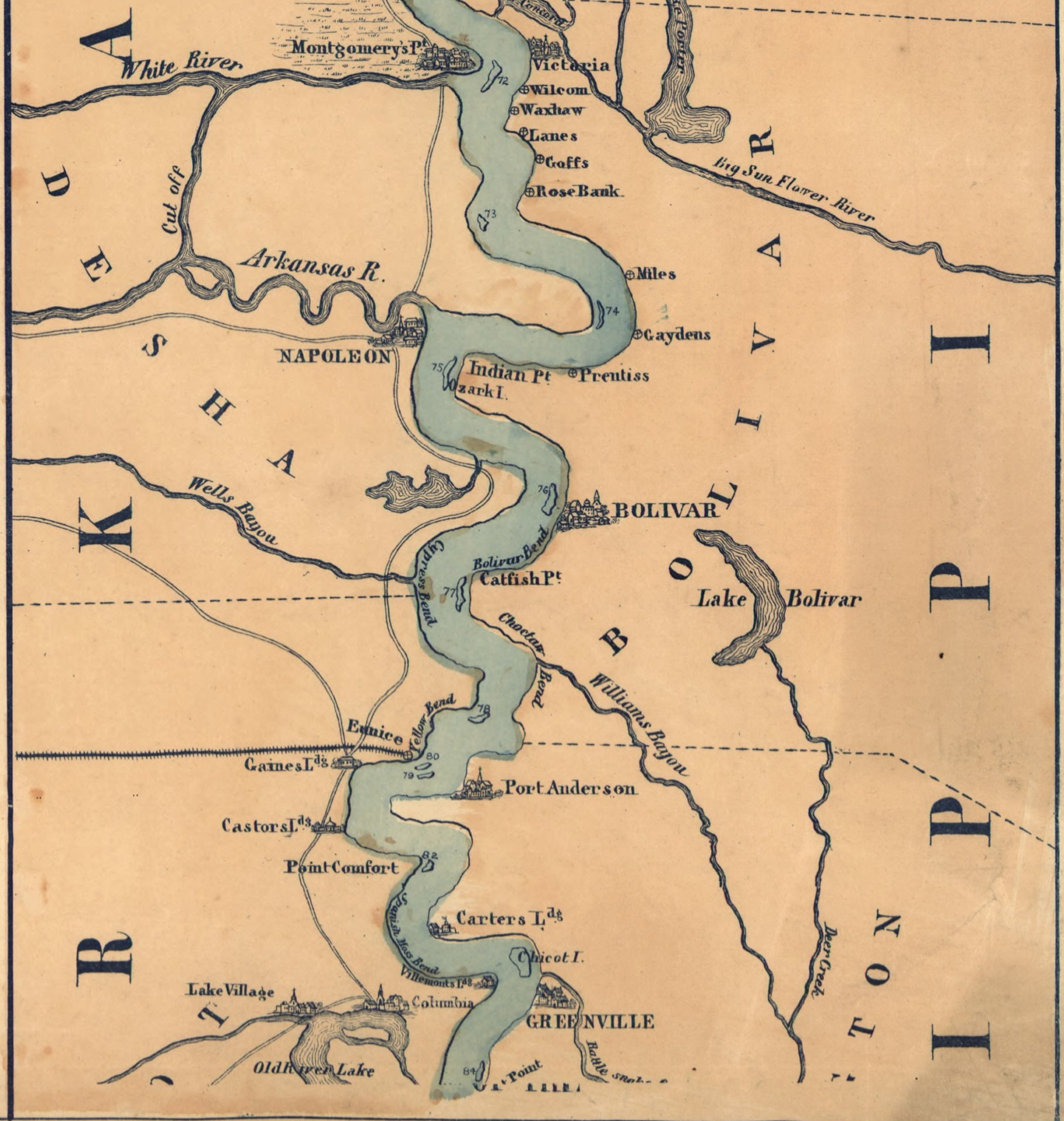
Landmarks near the confluence of the Mississippi and Arkansas Rivers, showing roads to and from Gaines Landing

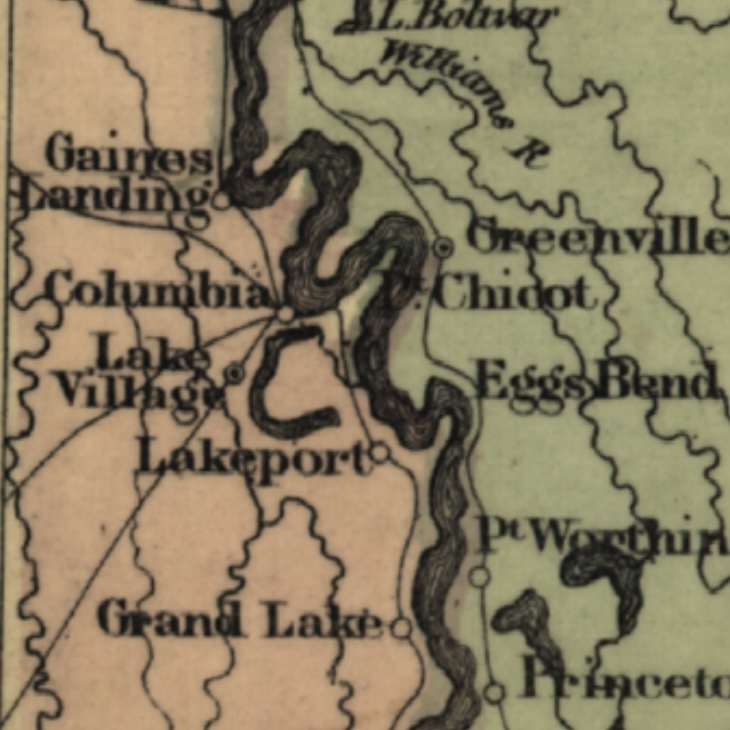
Gaines Landing, Arkansas, and environs, mapped 1862

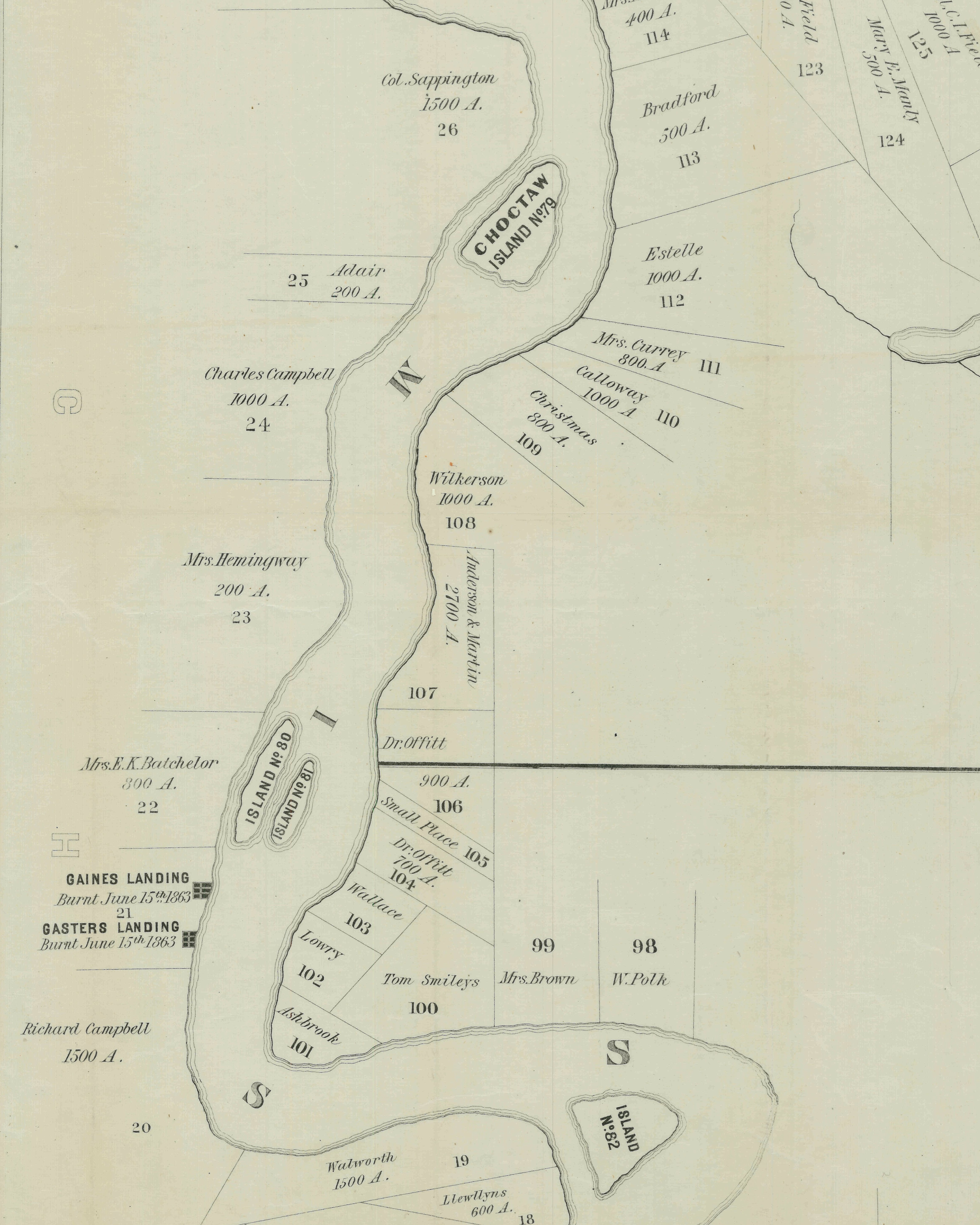
Gaines Landing and Gasters Landing, both "burned June 15, 1863," as mapped during Reconstruction in Arkansas

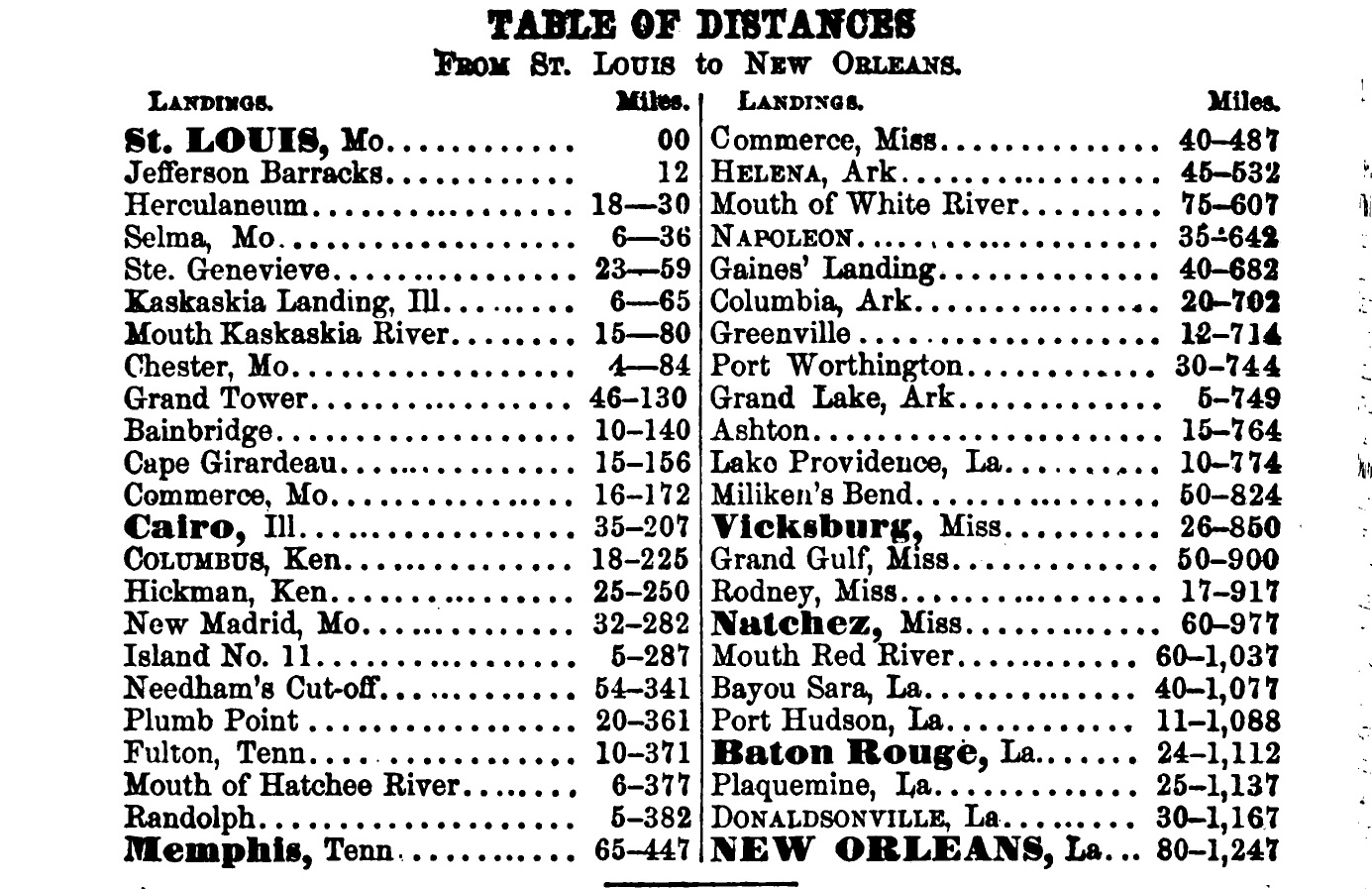
1866 table of distances between landings along the Mississippi River between St. Louis and New Orleans

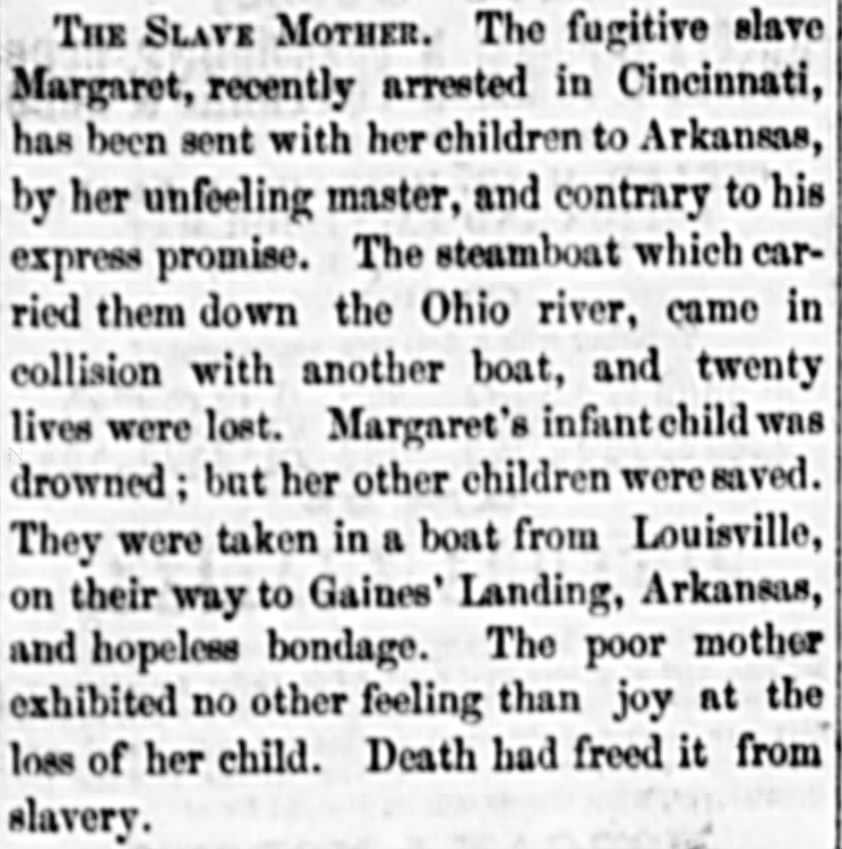
Margaret Garner was en route to Gaines Landing when a boat collision killed her baby ("The Slave Mother" The Union and Journal, Biddeford, Maine, March 28, 1856)

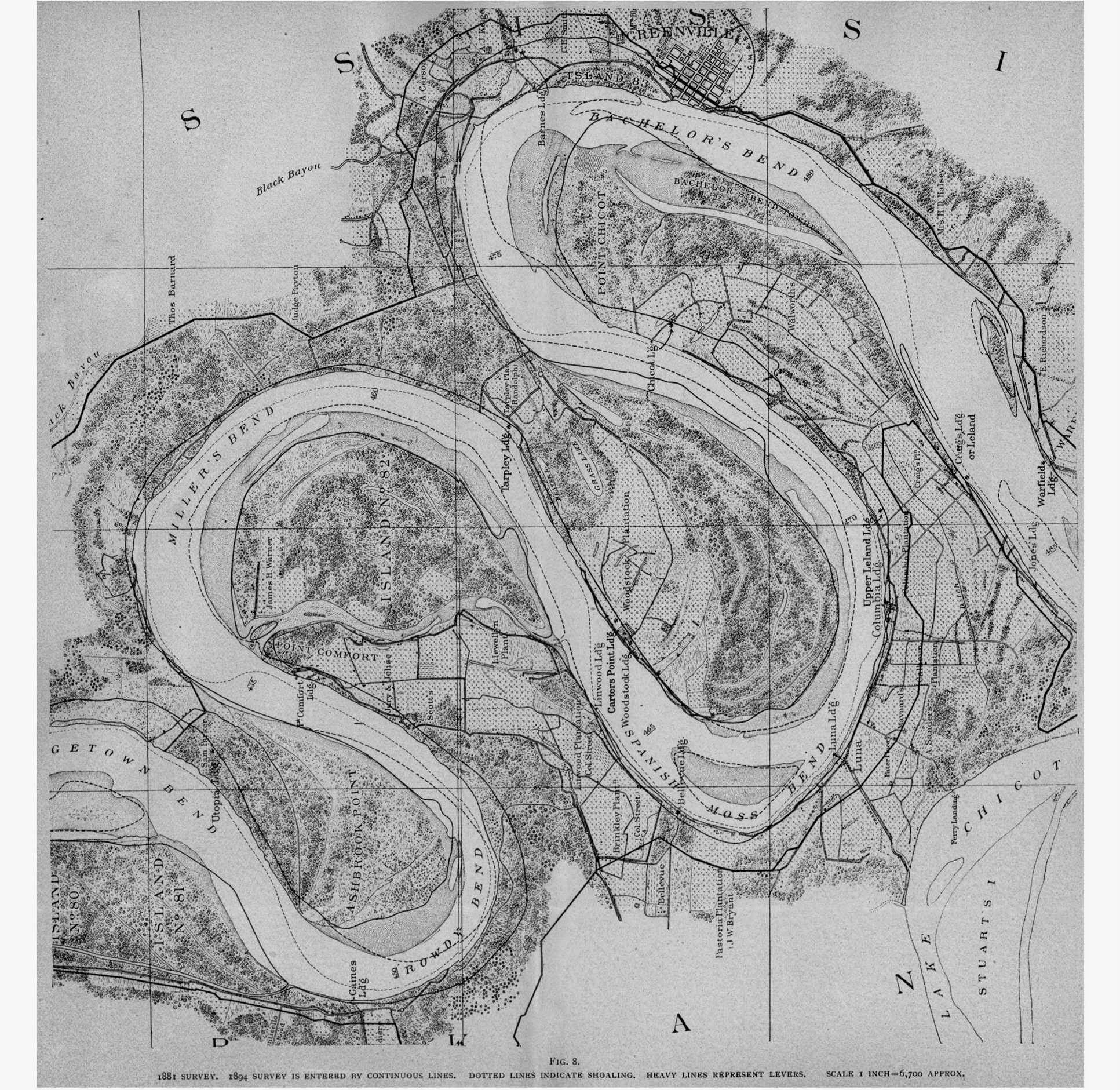
Map of the Greenville Bends of the Mississippi, as surveyed 1894
