= List of ship launches in 1862 =

The list of ship launches in 1862 includes a chronological list of some ships launched in 1862.

| Date | Ship | Class | Builder | Location | State | Notes |
|---|---|---|---|---|---|---|
| 1 January | G. C. Love | Schooner | W. Read | Ipswich | United Kingdom | For private owner. |
| 1 January | James Riddell | Snow | Taylor & Scouler | Sunderland | United Kingdom | For Mr. Riddell. |
| 1 January | Lord Royston | Steamship | W. Pile Jr. | Sunderland | United Kingdom | For R. Young. |
| 2 January | City of Aberdeen | Clipper | Messrs. John Duthie & Sons | Aberdeen | United Kingdom | For Mr. Tulloch. |
| 17 January | Helenslee | Clipper | Messrs. A. M'Millan & Son | Dumbarton | United Kingdom | For Messrs. Patrick Henderson & Co. |
| 17 January | Port Royal | Gunboat | Thomas Stack | New York Navy Yard | United States | For United States Navy. |
| 17 January | No. 22 | Hopper barge | River Tyne Commissioners | Howdon | United Kingdom | For River Tyne Commissioners. |
| 18 January | Emily | Brig | Messrs. Hall | Aberdeen | United Kingdom | For Messrs. Ingham, Stephens & Co. |
| 18 January | Pasithea | Barque | Messrs. Thomas Vernon & Sons | Liverpool | United Kingdom | For E. Preston. |
| 25 January | Carondelet | Paddle steamer | John Hughes & S. D. Porter | Bayou St. John, Louisiana | Confederate States of America | For Confederate States Navy. |
| 30 January | Caledonia | Steamship | Messrs. Tod & MacGregor | Partick | United Kingdom | For Anchor Line. |
| 30 January | Ericsson | Floating battery | | Greenpoint, New York | United States | For United States Navy. |
| 30 January | Leith | Steamship | Messrs. S. & H. Morton & Co. | Leith | United Kingdom | For Messrs. James Miller & Sons. |
| 30 January | Monitor | Ironclad warship | Continental Iron Works | Brooklyn, New York | United States | For United States Navy. |
| 30 January | Paul Jones | Gunboat | J. J. Abrahams | Baltimore, Maryland | United States | For United States Navy. |
| January | Eleanor Isabella | Merchantman | W. Barclay | Sunderland | United Kingdom | For Dodds & Co. |
| January | John and Elizabeth | Snow | John Lister | Sunderland | United Kingdom | For J. Elliott. |
| January | Prince Impérial | Merchantman | | | United States | For A. Belloc. |
| January | Saint Thomas Packet | Brig | D. A. Douglas | Southwick | United Kingdom | For Longton & Co. |
| 6 February | Louisiana | Ironclad | E. C. Murray | New Orleans, Louisiana | Confederate States of America | For Confederate States Navy. |
| 13 February | Lizzie Annie | Snow | G. & J. Mills | Sunderland | United Kingdom | For W. Tulloch. |
| 14 February | Africa | Rosario-class sloop | | Devonport Dockyard | United Kingdom | For Royal Navy. |
| 14 February | Bellissima | Clipper | Messrs. Edward Lawrence & Co. | Toxteth | United Kingdom | For Messrs. D. Whittle & Co. |
| 14 February | Galena | Broadside ironclad | H.L and C.S. Bushnell | Mystic, Connecticut | United States | For United States Navy. |
| 15 February | Ann Shepherd | Schooner | T. Smith | Preston | United Kingdom | For James Bradley, John Bradley, R. Bradley, James Bradshaw, John Bradshaw, T. Corless, T. Dickenson, Miss Eborall, Daniel Fare and Messrs. W. Shepherd. |
| 15 February | Warden Law | Barque | J. Haswell | Sunderland | United Kingdom | For Robert H. Gayner. |
| 17 February | Mary Fanny | Coaster | W. E. Paynter | Amlwch | United Kingdom | For private owner. |
| 17 February | Nan Zing | Paddle steamer | Messrs. Tod & MacGregor | Partick | United Kingdom | For B. Harkost. |
| 17 February | Portland | East Indiaman | Messrs. John Reid & Co. | Greenock | United Kingdom | For Messrs. Temperley, Carter, Darke, & Co. |
| 17 February | Selim | Clipper | Messrs. J. T. Rose & Co. | Leith | United Kingdom | For Thomas Robertson. |
| 18 February | John George | Brig | Messrs. David Burns & Co | Aberdeen | United Kingdom | For Mr. M'Lauchlan. |
| 19 February | Reliance | Fishing smack | E. Hunt | Aldeburgh | United Kingdom | For Messrs. Fisher & Reade. |
| 19 February | Volga | Steamship | Messrs. Charles & William Earle | Hull | United Kingdom | For Messrs. C. M. Norwood & Co. |
| 22 February | Adirondack | Sloop-of-war | | New York Navy Yard | United States | For United States Navy. |
| February | Chance | Merchantman | Messrs. Denny & Rankine | Dumbarton | United Kingdom | For Walter Grieve. |
| February | Haitienne | West Indiaman | Messrs. Denny & Rankine | Dumbarton | United Kingdom | For Messrs. W. D. Roberts & Co. |
| February | Isabella Atkinson | Barque | Rawson & Watson | Sunderland | United Kingdom | For Mr. Atkinson. |
| February | Naiad | Steamship | Woolwich Steam-Packet Company | Woolwich | United Kingdom | For Woolwich Steam-Packet Company. |
| February | Rebecca | Schooner | Joseph & Nicholas Butson | Bodinnick or Polruan | United Kingdom | For Clements & Co. |
| February | Yeo | Smack | Mr. Bevans | Llanelly | United Kingdom | For private owner. |
| 3 March | City of Bombay | Merchantman | Messrs. Alexander Stephen & Sons | Kelvinhaugh | United Kingdom | For Messrs. George Smith & Sons. |
| 5 March | Jessie Stewart | Steamship | Joseph Russell | Ardrossan | United Kingdom | For private owner. |
| 5 March | Keangsoo | Despatch vessel | J. Samuel White | Cowes | United Kingdom | For Imperial Chinese Navy. |
| 8 March | Virginia | Ironclad warship | | Portsmouth, Virginia | Confederate States | Rebuilt from the wreck of the USS Merrimack |
| 14 March | Olympia | Clipper | Adamson | Alloa | United Kingdom | For private owner. |
| 15 March | Artemisia | Barque | Todd & Brown | Sunderland | United Kingdom | For J. Patton. |
| 15 March | Claude Hamilton | Steamship | Messrs. C. Mitchell & Co. | Low Walker | United Kingdom | For Intercolonial Royal Mail Steam Packet Company. |
| 15 March | Trafalgar | Barque | William Briggs & Son | Sunderland | United Kingdom | For Mr. Collingwood. |
| 16 March | Cimarron | Gunboat | D. S. Merschon | Bordentown, New Jersey | United Kingdom | For United States Navy. |
| 18 March | Rattler | Camelion-class sloop | | Deptford Dockyard | United Kingdom | For Royal Navy. |
| 20 March | Juniata | Sloop-of-war | Philadelphia Navy Yard | Philadelphia, Pennsylvania | United States | For United States Navy. |
| 26 March | Emerald Isle | Paddle steamer | Messrs. J. & G. Thompson | Govan | United Kingdom | For Dundalk Steam Packet Company. |
| 28 March | Canandaigua | Sloop-of-war | | Boston Navy Yard | United States | For United States Navy. |
| 29 March | Psyche | Psyche-class despatch vessel | | Pembroke Dockyard | United Kingdom | For Royal Navy. |
| 31 March | Lee Min | Steamship | Thomas B. Sneath | Rutherglen | United Kingdom | For private owner. |
| March | Claudine | Full-rigged ship | James Laing | Sunderland | United Kingdom | For Ord & Co. |
| March | Emerald Isle | Paddle steamer | Messrs. J. & G. Thomson | Govan | United Kingdom | For Dundalk Steam Packet Company. |
| March | Lee Min | Steamship | T. B. Seath | Rutherglen | United Kingdom | For private owner. |
| March | Shamrock | Brig | J. & R. Bailey | Shoreham-by-Sea | United Kingdom | For Thomas Gates & Co. |
| March | No. 21 | Hopper barge | River Tyne Commissioners | Howdon | United Kingdom | For River Tyne Commissioners. |
| 1 April | Nelson | Merchantman | Messrs. Laurence Hill & Co. | Port Glasgow | United Kingdom | For Messrs. Potter, Wilson, & Co. |
| 2 April | Genesee | Paddle steamer | | Boston Navy Yard | United States | For United States Navy. |
| 2 April | Colleen Bawn | Paddle steamer | Messrs. Randolph, Elder & Co. | Govan | United Kingdom | For Drogheda Steam Packet Co. |
| 2 April | Columbine | Rosario-class sloop | | Deptford Dockyard | United Kingdom | For Royal Navy. |
| 3 April | Belhaven | Schooner | Bowman and Drummond | Blyth | United Kingdom | For W. Brodie. |
| 3 April | Lotus | Steamship | Messrs. Henderson, Coulborn & Co. | Renfrew | United Kingdom | For private owner. |
| 3 April | Memphis | Cargo ship | William Denny and Brothers | Dumbarton | United Kingdom | For Peter Denny & Tomas Begbie. |
| 5 April | Maggie | Schooner | | Liverpool | United Kingdom | For James Taylor. |
| 15 April | Arabian | Cargo ship | E. J. Harland | Belfast | United Kingdom | For J. Bibby & Son. |
| 15 April | Medusa | Barque | William Briggs & So | Sunderland | United Kingdom | For Allan & Sons. |
| 15 April | Sonoma | Gunboat | | Portsmouth Navy Yard | United States | For United States Navy |
| 16 April | Circe | Schooner | Messrs. Robert Steele & Co. | Greenock | United Kingdom | For David Richardson. |
| 16 April | Eure | Ardèche-class horse transport | Moulinié & Labat | Bordeaux | France | For French Navy. |
| 16 April | Deerfoot | Barque | W. Pile | Sunderland | United Kingdom | For Mr. Hewson. |
| 16 April | Luchana | Steamship | Messrs. W. Simons & Co | Renfrew | United Kingdom | For private owner. |
| 18 April | Tioga | Gunboat | | Boston Navy Yard | United Kingdom | For United States Navy. |
| 24 April | Arkansas | Ironclad warship | J. T. Shirley | Memphis, Tennessee | Confederate States of America | For Confederate States Navy. |
| 24 April | Mississippi | Ironclad | Nelson Tift & Asa F. Tift | New Orleans, Louisiana | Confederate States of America | For Confederate States Navy. |
| 28 April | Sacramento | Sloop-of-war | Portsmouth Navy Yard | Kittery, Maine | United States | For United States Navy. |
| 29 April | Thémis | Magicienne-class frigate | | Toulon | France | For French Navy. |
| 30 April | Janie | Yacht | Messrs. Wingate | Whiteinch | United Kingdom | For Thomas A. Lane. |
| April | Anonyma | Steamship | Messrs. Richardson & Duck | Stockton-on-Tees | United Kingdom | For private owner. |
| April | Arkansas | Arkansas-class ironclad | John T. Shirley | Memphis, Tennessee | Confederate States of America | For Confederate States Navy. |
| April | Brisbane | Steamship | Messrs. C. Connell & Co. | Scotstoun | United Kingdom | For Queensland Government. |
| April | Clydesdale | Steamship | Messrs. J. & G. Thompson | Govan | United Kingdom | For Messrs. David Hutcheson & Co. |
| April | Iolanthe | Schooner | Messrs. Cowie & Archibald | Douglas | Isle of Man | For Harry Bridson. |
| April | Isabella Hunter | Brigantine | Messrs. A. M'Millan & Son | Dumbarton | United Kingdom | For Walter Grieve. |
| April | Janet Fraser | Schooner | Messrs. A. M'Millan & Son | Dumbarton | United Kingdom | For Messrs. M'Innis & Niven. |
| April | Memphis | Steamship | Messrs. William Denny & Bros. | Dumbarton | United Kingdom | For Messrs. Begbie & Co. |
| April | Prince Consort | Steamship | Messrs. Caird & Co. | Glasgow | United Kingdom | For Loch Lomond Steamboat Company. |
| April | Tynemouth | Steamship | | Hartlepool | United Kingdom | For Messrs. W. S Lindsay & Co. |
| 1 May | Alligator | Submarine | Neafie & Levy | Kensington, Philadelphia | United States | First submarine of the United States Navy. |
| 1 May | Conemaugh | Paddle steamer | Portsmouth Navy Yard | Kittery, Maine | United States | For United States Navy. |
| 3 May | Smith-Briggs | Tug | | East Albany, New York | United States | For Schuyler Steam Towing Company. |
| 6 May | Richmond | Richmond-class ironclad | Gosport Navy Yard | Portsmouth, Virginia | Confederate States | For Confederate States Navy. |
| 10 May | Castilian | Cargo ship | Harland & Wolff | Belfast | United Kingdom | For J. Bibby & Sons. |
| 10 May | New Ironsides | Ironclad | William Cramp & Sons | Philadelphia, Pennsylvania | United States | For United States Navy |
| 12 May | Ann Mitchell | Brig | John Smith | Aberdeen | United Kingdom | For D.Mitchell. |
| 14 May | Dinorwic | Schooner | Rees Jones | Port Dinorwic | United Kingdom | For Messrs. Millington, Buckingham & Jones. |
| 14 May | Kaiser Max | Kaiser Max-class ironclad | Stabilimento Tecnico Triestino | Trieste | Austria | For Austrian Navy. |
| 14 May | May Flower | Ferry | Messrs. H. M. Lawrence & Co. | Liverpool | United Kingdom | For private owner. |
| 14 May | Scotia's Queen | Barque | J. H. Watson | Sunderland | United Kingdom | For George Watson. |
| 14 May | The Stranger | Sloop | John Goss | Pottington | United Kingdom | For private owner. |
| 15 May | Asphodel | Barque | James Hardie | Sunderland | United Kingdom | For T. Walker. |
| 15 May | Weeky | Schooner | W. Camper | Gosport | United Kingdom | For Prince Wittgenstein. |
| 16 May | Alliance | Tug | Messrs. M. Samuelson & Co. | Hull | United Kingdom | For New Steam-tug Company. |
| 16 May | Constance | Schooner | Messrs. Pearce and Ebenezer Roberts | Port Madoc | United Kingdom | For private owner. |
| 17 May | Neptune | Steamship | Messrs. M. Samuelson & Co | Hull | United Kingdom | For Messrs. Z. C. Pearson & Co. |
| 17 May | Viking | Brig | David Burns | Aberdeen | United Kingdom | For J. B. Adam. |
| 27 May | Heroine | Paddle steamer | Messrs. T. Wingate & Co. | Whiteinch | United Kingdom | For Messrs. Brown. |
| 28 May | Ouse | Steamship | Messrs. Charles & William Earle | Hull | United Kingdom | For Messrs. Thomas Wilson & Co. |
| 31 May | Adela | Merchantman | Cobbold | Ipswich | United Kingdom | For private owner. |
| 31 May | Liguria | Steamship | Messrs C. Mitchell & Co. | Low Walker | United Kingdom | For private owner. |
| 31 May | Shannon | East Indiaman | Messrs. R. & H. Green | Blackwall | United Kingdom | For private owner. |
| 31 May | Star of Australia | Steamship | Messrs. J. Wigham Richardson & Co. | Low Walker | United Kingdom | For private owner. |
| 31 May | Zara | Cargo steamer | Palmer Bros & Co | Jarrow | United Kingdom | For A. G. Robinson. |
| May | Queen of the Orwell | Steamship | Messrs. Napier | Glasgow | United Kingdom | For private owner. |
| May | Schwarzenberg | Screw frigate | | Pola | Austrian Empire | For Austrian Navy, conversion of the sail frigate originally launched in 1854. |
| Mau | Somersetshire | Full-rigged ship | | Medford, Massachusetts | United States | For private owner. |
| 2 June | Briton | Paddle steamer | Messrs. Tod & MacGregor | Partick | United Kingdom | For private owner. |
| 3 June | Oder | Steamship | Messrs. Barclay, Curle, & Co. | Glasgow | United Kingdom | For Leith, Hull, and Hamburg Steam Packet Company. |
| 6 June | Janet Houston | Schooner | Messrs. J. & R. Swan | Maryhill | United Kingdom | For Messrs. Burrell & Son. |
| 12 June | Carnatic | Steamship | Samuda Brothers | Cubitt Town | United Kingdom | For Peninsular and Oriental Steam Navigation Company. |
| 12 June | Cornwallis | Full-rigged ship | Messrs. Thomas Vernon & Son | Liverpool | United Kingdom | For Messrs. Liston, Young, & Co. |
| 14 June | Ocean Child | Brigantine | John Barter | Brixham | United Kingdom | For William R. Pierce, William Varwell and others. |
| 14 June | Prinz Eugen | Kaiser Max-class ironclad | Stabilimento Tecnico Triestino | Trieste | Austria | For Austrian Navy. |
| 26 June | Guadaira | Steamship | Messrs. Henderson, Coulborn & Co. | Renfrew | United Kingdom | For private owner. |
| 26 June | Prince Consort | Prince Consort-class ironclad | | | United Kingdom | For Royal Navy. |
| 27 June | Syracuse | Steamship | Messrs. W. Denny & Bros. | Dumbarton | United Kingdom | For Messrs. W. Denny & Bros. |
| June | Briton | Paddle steamer | Tod & MacGregor | Glasgow | United Kingdom | For Glasgow & Stranraer Steam Packet Co. |
| June | Flying Meteor | Tug | Messrs. Blackwood & Gordon | Port Glasgow | United Kingdom | For Clyde Navigation Company. |
| June | Oder | Steamship | Messrs. Barclay, Curle, & Co. | Stobcross | United Kingdom | For Leith, Hull & Hamburg Steam Packet Company. |
| June | Trent | Steamship | | Kingston upon Hull | United Kingdom | For Messrs, Thomas Wilsons, Sons, & Co. |
| June | William Connall | Steamship | Messrs. W. Simons & Co. | Renfrew | United Kingdom | For H. L. Saligman. |
| 1 July | Acapulco | Barque | T. R. Oswald | Sunderland | United Kingdom | For Shallcross & Higham. |
| 1 July | Fylla | Gunboat | Orlogsværftet | Copenhagen | Denmark | For Royal Danish Navy. |
| 1 July | United States | Steamship | C. & R. Poillon | Brooklyn, New York | United States | For Wakeman, Dimon & Co. |
| 1 July | Viking | Barque | Robert Thompson | Sunderland | United Kingdom | For Joseph Potts and others. |
| 3 July | Humility | Barque | John Lister | South Hylton | United Kingdom | For J. Heatley. |
| 3 July | John Reay | Barque | W. Chilton | South Hylton | United Kingdom | For private owner. |
| 3 July | Lord Clyde | Paddle steamer | Caird and Co. | Greenock | United Kingdom | For Dublin & Glasgow Sailing and Steam Packet Company. |
| 3 July | Margaret | Barque or Snow | Messrs. Gibbon & Nicol. | Hylton | United Kingdom | For H. Robson. |
| 10 July | Monongahela | Sloop-of-war | | Philadelphia Navy Yard | United States | For United States Navy |
| 12 July | Golondrina | Barque | Robert Thompson & Sons | Sunderland | United Kingdom | For William Nicholson & Sons. |
| 12 July | Merchant | Steamship | David Bell | Buffalo, New York | United States | For James C. Evans & Edwin T. Evans. |
| 16 July | Dwina | Steamship | T. R. Oswald | Sunderland | United Kingdom | For George Fleming. |
| 18 July | Magenta | Corvette | Medici Arsenal | Livorno | Italy | For Regia Marina. |
| 21 July | Catalonian | Cargo ship | Harland & Wolff | Belfast | United Kingdom | For J. Bibby & Sons. |
| 24 July | Vityaz | Bogatyr-class corvette | | Pori | (Russian Empire) Grand Duchy of Finland | For Imperial Russian Navy. |
| 26 July | Don Juan d'Austria | Kaiser Max-class | Stabilimento Tecnico Triestino | Trieste | Austria | For Austrian Navy. |
| 29 July | Alabama | Sloop-of-war | John Laird, Sons, and Company | Birkenhead | Confederate States | For Confederate States Navy. |
| 31 July | Bellona | Steamship | Messrs. Smith & Rodger | Govan | United Kingdom | For Malcolmson Bros. |
| July | Aries | Steamship | James Laing | Deptford | United Kingdom | For Frederic Peter Obicini. |
| July | Athenian | Barque | Haswell | Sunderland | United Kingdom | For Mr. Wrighson. |
| July | Bertha | Brig | J. Robinson | Deptford | United Kingdom | For Mr. Tongs. |
| July | Craig Ellachie | Brig | John Blumer | Sunderland | United Kingdom | For Marshall Twedell. |
| July | Eliza Laing | Barque | D. A. Douglas | Southwick | United Kingdom | For Mr. Laing. |
| July | Emma Davison | Brig | Robinson | Sunderland | United Kingdom | For James Davison. |
| July | Ever Green | Brig | J. Robinson | Pallion | United Kingdom | For Messrs. Crawford & Giles. |
| July | Flimby | Brigantine | Messrs. John Wood & Co. | Maryport | United Kingdom | For private owner. |
| July | Helen Richards | Brig | Messrs. Todd & Brown | Hylton | United Kingdom | For Mr. Henderson. |
| July | Kingstown | Paddle steamer | Messrs. T. Wingate & Co. | Whiteinch | United Kingdom | For Dublin and Kingstown Steam Packet Company (limited). |
| July | Mary Ann | Barque | R. H. Potts & Bros. | Sunderland | United Kingdom | For Potts Bros. |
| July | Medusa | Steamship | James Laing | Deptford | United Kingdom | For William Schaw Lindsay. |
| July | Princess Alice | Brig | J. Smurthwaite | Sunderland | United Kingdom | For Black Ball Line. |
| July | Robert Stephenson | Brig or Snow | Barkley & Co. | Sunderland | United Kingdom | For private owner. |
| July | Unnamed | Steamship | James Laing | Deptford | United Kingdom | For private owner. |
| 9 August | Lackawanna | Sloop-of-war | | New York Navy Yard | United States | For United States Navy |
| 9 August | Lucerne | Steamship | James Laing | Sunderland | United Kingdom | For E. T. Gourley & Co. |
| 11 August | John Hunter | Barque | J. Barkes | Sunderland | United Kingdom | For Watson & Co. |
| 20 August | Basilisk | Camäleon-class gunboat | Königliche Werf | Danzig | Prussia | For Prussian Navy. |
| 22 August | Blitz | Camäleon-class gunboat | Königliche Werf | Danzig | Prussia | For Prussian Navy. |
| 25 August | Ann Mills | Barque | B. & J. Gardner | Sunderland | United Kingdom | For W. Mills. |
| 26 August | Herrendera | Barque | W. Pile | Sunderland | United Kingdom | For Mr. Madge. |
| 30 August | Passaic | Passaic-class monitor | Continental Iron Works | Greenport, New York | United States | For United States Navy. |
| August | Burdwan | Barque | T. & J. Brocklebank | Whitehaven | United Kingdom | For Thomad & Ralph Brocklebank. |
| August | Romeo | Sternwheeler | | Brownsville, Pennsylvania | United Kingdom | For John I. Rhoades. |
| 4 September | Indianola | Ironclad | Joseph Brown | Cincinnati, Ohio | United States | For United States Navy. |
| 9 September | Neva | Brig | Ferguson, Rankin & Co | Bathurst | (United Kingdom of Great Britain and Ireland) Colony of New Brunswick | For private owner. |
| 9 September | Paixhans | Floating battery | | Bordeaux | France | For French Navy. |
| 9 September | Palestro | Floating battery | | Bordeaux | France | For French Navy. |
| 10 September | Hauch | Gunboat | Orlogsværftet | Copenhagen | Denmark | For Royal Danish Navy. |
| 10 September | Royal Oak | Prince Consort-class ironclad | Chatham Dockyard | Chatham | United Kingdom | For Royal Navy. |
| 20 September | Labourdonnais | Steamship | | Toulon | France | For private owner |
| 25 September | Chanticleer | Barque | James Laing | Sunderland | United Kingdom | For John R. Kelso. |
| 26 September | Coldstream | Barque | James Laing | Sunderland | United Kingdom | For Johnstone, Sons & Co. |
| 26 September | George Avery | Barque | Robert Thompson Jr. | Sunderland | United Kingdom | For J. Avery. |
| 26 September | Hector | Hector-class ironclad | | Portsmouth Dockyard | United Kingdom | For Royal Navy. |
| 26 September | Orne | Ardèche-class horse transport | Bichon freres | Lormont | France | For French Navy. |
| 26 September | Rosalie | Snow | William Briggs & Son | Sunderland | United Kingdom | For J. Wood. |
| 27 September | Patapsco | Passaic-class monitor | Harlan and Hollingsworth | Wilmington, Delaware | United States | For United States Navy. |
| September | Palmetto State | Richmond-class ironclad | Cameron & Co. | Charleston, South Carolina | Confederate States | For Confederate States Navy. |
| September | Whiteadder | Barque | Thomas Bilbe & Co. | Rotherhithe | United Kingdom | For John Willis & Son. |
| 5 October | Villa de Madrid | Screw frigate | Arsenal de la Carraca | San Fernando | Spain | For Spanish Navy. |
| 6 October | Dido | Steamship | Messrs. C. & W. Earle | Hull | United Kingdom | For Messrs. Wilson, Sons, & Co. |
| 7 October | Nahant | Passaic-class monitor | Harrison Loring, City Point Works | Boston, Massachusetts | United States | For United States Navy. |
| 9 October | D. Cornwell | Barquentine | | Port Burwell | (United Kingdom of Great Britain and Ireland) Province of Canada | For private owner. |
| 9 October | Montauk | Passaic-class Monitor | Continental Iron Works | Greenpoint, New York | United States | For United States Navy. |
| 9 October | Star of Erin | Sailing ship | Harland & Wolff | Belfast | United Kingdom | For J. P. Corry & Co. |
| 16 October | Pique | Gunboat | | Toulon | France | For French Navy. |
| 16 October | Ticonderoga | Lackawanna-class sloop | | New York Navy Yard | United States | For United States Navy. |
| 21 October | Recife | Sailing ship | Harland & Wolff | Belfast | United Kingdom | For James Napier. |
| 23 October | Regard | Snow | G. Bartram | Sunderland | United Kingdom | For Robert Cropton. |
| 24 October | Caledonia | Prince Consort-class ironclad | Woolwich Dockyard | Woolwich | United Kingdom | For Royal Navy. |
| 24 October | Macedon | Barque | William Briggs & Son | Sunderland | United Kingdom | For William Brass. |
| 25 October | Drôme | Ardèche-class horse transport | Chantiers Arman | Bordeaux | France | For French Navy. |
| 25 October | Aunt Lizzie | Barque | w. Pile | Sunderland | United Kingdom | For Thomas Scott. |
| 27 October | Sangamon | Passaic-class monitor | Reaney, Son & Archbold | Chester, Pennsylvania | United States | For United States Navy. |
| 30 October | Union | Paddle steamer | Jeremiah Simoson | Greenpoint, New York | United Kingdom | For Cornelius Vanderbilt. |
| October | Montego | Merchantman | James Hardie | Sunderland | United Kingdom | For M'Inroy & Co. |
| 5 November | Weehawken | Passaic-class monitor | Zeno Secor & Company | Jersey City, New Jersey | United States | For United States Navy. |
| 8 November | John C. Munro | Full-rigged ship | James Laing | Sunderland | United Kingdom | For George Lawson Munro & Co. |
| 8 November | Poonah | Steamship | Thames Ironworks and Shipbuilding Company | Blackwall | United Kingdom | For Peninsular and Oriental Steam Navigation Company. |
| 13 November | Granite City | Paddle steamer | Messrs. Denny & Rankin | Dumbarton | United Kingdom | For Messrs. Patrick Henderson & Co. |
| 22 November | Orontes | Troopship | Cammell Laird | Birkenhead | United Kingdom | For Royal Navy. |
| 22 November | Saxon | Steamship | Messrs. C. A. Day & Co. | Northam | United Kingdom | For Union Steamship Company of New Zealand. |
| 24 November | Emma | Steamship | Barclay, Curle & Co. | Stobcross | United Kingdom | For Thomas S. Begbie. |
| 24 November | Fahkee | Steamship | Edward F. Williams | Greenpoint, New York | United States | For Wetmore & Cryder. |
| 25 November | Gertrude | Steamship | Barclay, Curle & Co. | Stobcross | United Kingdom | For Thomas. S. Begbie. |
| 25 November | Sarthe | Sarthe-class horse transport | Arsenal de Cherbourg | Cherbourg | France | For French Navy. |
| November | America | Steamship | Messrs. Caird & Co. | Greenock | United Kingdom | For Norddeutscher Lloyd. |
| Unknown date | Ariel | Brigantine | T. & J. Brocklebank | Whitehaven | United Kingdom | For Thomas Kelly. |
| November | Bussorah | Steamship | Messrs. L. Hill & Co. | Greenock | United Kingdom | For Calcutta & Burmah Steam Navigation Company. |
| November | Fanny Slater | Schooner | G. Bartram | Sunderland | United Kingdom | For Mr. Jarvis. |
| November | Flora | Steamship | Messrs. Dudgeon Bros. | Limehouse | United Kingdom | For private owner. |
| November | Vanda | Barque | Messrs. Hall & Co. | Aberdeen | United Kingdom | For private owner. |
| November | Wolf | Steamship | Messrs. Napier | Glasgow | United Kingdom | For Messrs. Burns. |
| 2 December | Tuscumbia | Gunboat | Joseph Brown | Cincinnati, Ohio | United Kingdom | For United States Navy. |
| 6 December | Keokuk | Ironclad | Charles W. Whitney | New York | United States | For United States Navy. |
| 6 December | Nantucket | Passaic-class | Atlantic Iron Works | Boston, Massachusetts | United States | For United States Navy |
| 6 December | Catskill | Passaic-class monitor | Continental Iron Works | Greenport, New York | United States | For United States Navy. |
| 8 December | Shenandoah | Sloop-of-war | | Philadelphia Navy Yard | United States | For United States Navy. |
| 16 December | Catskill | Passaic-class | Continental Iron Works | Greenpoint, New York | United States | For United States Navy. |
| 23 December | Sassacus | Sassacus-class gunboat | | Portsmouth Navy Yard | United States | For United States Navy |
| 27 December | Bloodhound | Steamship | Messrs. R. Steele & Co. | Greenock | United Kingdom | For Messrs. Baine & Johnston. |
| December | Blackwood | Merchantman | Benjamin Hodgson | Sunderland | United Kingdom | For John Blackwood. |
| December | Rosario | Brig | John Batchelor, or Batchelor Bros. | Cardiff | United Kingdom | For John M. Hamilton. |
| December | Worrall | Barque | Harland & Wolff | Belfast | United Kingdom | For James Worrall. |
| Unknown date | Agenoria | Barque | John T. Alcock | Sunderland | United Kingdom | For Storey & Co. |
| Unknown date | Agnes Holt | Barque | G. S. Moore | Sunderland | United Kingdom | For Mr. McDonald. |
| Unknown date | Agnes Irving | Paddle steamer | Charles Lungley | Deptford | United Kingdom | For Clarence and Richmond River Steam Navigation Company. |
| Unknown date | Alecia Annie | Merchantman | John Blumer | Sunderland | United Kingdom | For R. Kirby. |
| Unknown date | Alexandra | Barque | Todd & Brown | Sunderland | United Kingdom | For Beckwith & Co. |
| Unknown date | Alice Richardson | Merchantman | G. & J. Mills | Sunderland | United Kingdom | For Richardson & Co. |
| Unknown date | Alice Ritson | Merchantman | G. & J. Mills | Sunderland | United Kingdom | For Ritson & Co. |
| Unknown date | Alma | Schooner | | Long Island, New York | United States | For private owner. |
| Unknown date | Anne | Merchantman | W. Pickersgill | Sunderland | United Kingdom | For G. Lawson. |
| Unknown date | Anne Jane | Merchantman | J. Errington | Sunderland | United Kingdom | For Mr. Watkins. |
| Unknown date | Ann Potts | Merchantman | J. M. Reed | Sunderland | United Kingdom | For J. Potts. |
| Unknown date | Antietam | Tug | Winson & Co. | Philadelphia, Pennsylvania | United States | For private owner. |
| Unknown date | Ariadne | Merchantman | S. Metcalf | Sunderland | United Kingdom | For J. Long. |
| Unknown date | Banshee | Paddle steamer | | Liverpool | United Kingdom | For private owner. |
| Unknown date | Barbara | Merchantman | A. Simey | Sunderland | United Kingdom | For D. Sharer. |
| Unknown date | Barlochan | Barque | John Anderton | Runcorn | United Kingdom | For Samuel Wylde. |
| Unknown date | Belgravia | Merchantman | William Doxford | Sunderland | United Kingdom | For Joseph Somes & Co. |
| Unknown date | Bertis | Merchantman | L. Wheatley | North Hylton | United Kingdom | For Evansa & Co. |
| Unknown date | Bienville | Steamship | John Hughes & S. D. Porter | Bayou St. John, Louisiana | Confederate States of America | For Confederate States Navy. |
| Unknown date | Blanche | Steamship | A. & J. Inglis Ltd. | Glasgow | United Kingdom | For private owner. |
| Unknown date | Brilliant | Sternwheeler | | Brownsville, Pennsylvania | United States | For private owner. |
| Unknown date | Britannia | Paddle steamer | Barclay, Curle & Co. Ltd. | Glasgow | United Kingdom | For Leith, Hull & Hamburg Shipping Co. |
| Unknown date | Brothers | Merchantman | William Doxford | Sunderland | United Kingdom | For W. & J. Kish. |
| Unknown date | Camillus | Merchantman | J. Denniston | Sunderland | United Kingdom | For W. Holm's. |
| Unknown date | Carisbrooke | Merchantman | J. Davison | Sunderland | United Kingdom | For P. Dale. |
| Unknown date | Catherine | Merchantman | W. Naizby | Sunderland | United Kingdom | For N. Cook. |
| Unknown date | Chanaral | Merchantman | T. R. Oswald | Sunderland | United Kingdom | For Shallcross & Co. |
| Unknown date | Charente | Steamship | James Laing | Sunderland | United Kingdom | For T. & J. Harrison. |
| Unknown date | Charente | Steamship | William Pile | Sunderland | United Kingdom | For Napoleon III. |
| Unknown date | Chicora | Ironclad | James M. Eason | Charleston, South Carolina | Confederate States of America | For Confederate States Navy. |
| Unknown date | Chillicothe | River gunboat | | Cincinnati, Ohio | United States | For United States Navy. |
| Unknown date | City of Dunedin | Paddle steamer | A. Denny | Dumbart | United Kingdom | For private owner. |
| Unknown date | City of Melbourne | Paddle steamer | Messrs. J. & G. Thompson | Govan | United Kingdom | For Australasian Steam Navigation Company. |
| Unknown date | Clanalpine | Merchantman | builder | Sunderland | United Kingdom | For Williamson & Co. |
| Unknown date | Claro Babuyan | Barque | W. Adamson | Sunderland | United Kingdom | For W. Adamson. |
| Unknown date | Clifton | Ferry | | Greenpoint, New York | United States | For private owner. |
| Unknown date | Colorado II | Sternwheeler | John Gunder North | Arizona City, Arizona | Confederate States of America | For George A. Johnson & Company. |
| Unknown date | Commerce | Brig | J. & R. Bailey | Shoreham-by-Sea | United Kingdom | For Thomas Gates. |
| Unknown date | Commodore Morris | Paddle steamer | | New York | United Kingdom | For private owner. |
| Unknown date | Cruiser | Merchantman | James Robinson | Sunderland | United Kingdom | For Shotton & Co. |
| Unknown date | Cubana | Barque | W. Pile | Sunderland | United Kingdom | For James Hay. |
| Unknown date | Cupid | Steamboat | | Blackwall, London | United Kingdom | For private woner |
| Unknown date | Daisy | Snow | J. & J. Brown | Sunderland | United Kingdom | For Potts & Co. |
| Unknown date | Diligent | Merchantman | W. Barclay | Sunderland | United Kingdom | For T. Knight. |
| Unknown date | Dorothea | Barque | W. Naizby | Hylton | United Kingdom | For Chatt & Co. |
| Unknown date | Edith Mary | Merchantman | Glaholm & Robson | Sunderland | United Kingdom | For Mr. Glaholm. |
| Unknown date | Elizabeth Ferguson | Merchantman | G. Short | Sunderland | United Kingdom | For Mr. Ferguson. |
| Unknown date | Emperor | Barque | W. Adamson | Sunderland | United Kingdom | For W. Adamson. |
| Unknown date | Energy | Merchantman | Rutter & Cummings | Sunderland | United Kingdom | For Hedley & Co. |
| Unknown date | Erebus | Tug | | St. Louis, Missouri | United States | For United States Navy. |
| Unknown date | Esmerelda | Sternwheeler | Patrick Henry Tiernan | San Francisco, California | United States | For Washington Pitts. |
| Unknown date | Etna | Corvette | Regio Cantiere di Castellammare di Stabia | Castellammare di Stabia | Italy | For Regia Marina. |
| Unknown date | Eugenie | Paddle steamer | Messrs. Samuelson & Co. | Hull | United Kingdom | For private owner. |
| Unknown date | Exchange | Sternwheeler | | Brownsville, Pennsylvania | United States | For private owner. |
| Unknown date | Fawn | Clipper | Messrs. Walter Hood & Co | Aberdeen | United Kingdom | For Tasmanian Line. |
| Unknown date | Findon | Merchantman | | Sunderland | United Kingdom | For private owner. |
| Unknown date | Flora | Paddle steamer | R. S. Abbott & Co. | Hull | United Kingdom | For Stephen Gray. |
| Unknown date | Firefly | Tug | | St. Louis, Missouri | United States | For United States Army. |
| Unknown date | Florence | Sternwheeler | | Elizabeth, Pennsylvania, or Pittsburgh, Pennsylvania | United States | For private owner. |
| Unknown date | Florence Miller | Sternwheeler | | Cincinnati, Ohio | United States | For private owner. |
| Unknown date | Forest Rose | Sternwheeler | | Pittsburgh, Pennsylvania | United States | For private owner. |
| Unknown date | Fort Henry | Ferry | | Brooklyn, New York | United States | For Union Ferry Company. |
| Unknown date | Frederick Bassil | Merchantman | Taylor & Scourer | Sunderland | United Kingdom | For F. Bassil. |
| Unknown date | Gaines | Gunboat | | Mobile, Alabama | Confederate States of America | For Confederate States Navy. |
| Unknown date | Gaeta | Frigate | | Castellamare di Stabia | Italy | For Regia Marina. |
| Unknown date | Gazelle | Merchantman | W. Pile | Sunderland | United Kingdom | For private owner. |
| Unknown date | General Burnside | Steamship | | Wilmington, Delaware | United States | For private owner. |
| Unknown date | General Butler | Schooner | Hoskings & Ross | Essex, New York | United States | For private owner. |
| Unknown date | George & Richard | Merchantman | B. & J. Gardner | Sunderland | United Kingdom | For R. Humble. |
| Unknown date | George Croshaw | Merchantman | J. Smurthwaite | Sunderland | United Kingdom | For J. Brodie. |
| Unknown date | Glenbrook | Merchantman | Gray & Young | Sunderland | United Kingdom | For Harris & Co. |
| Unknown date | Glencaple | Merchantman | James Hardie | Sunderland | United Kingdom | For Johnathan Dickson. |
| Unknown date | Glenisla | Merchantman | J. Gill | Sunderland | United Kingdom | For Williamson & Co. |
| Unknown date | Glenmessen | Merchantman | J. Barkes | Sunderland | United Kingdom | For Mr. Templeton. |
| Unknown date | Glide | Sternwheeler | | Shousetown, Pennsylvania | United States | For private owner. |
| Unknown date | Governor | Tug | | New York | United States | For private owner. |
| Unknown date | Grahamstown | Merchantman | Robert Thompson Junior | Sunderland | United Kingdom | For Ellis & Co. |
| Unknown date | Hadleys | Merchantman | Rawson & Watson | Sunderland | United Kingdom | For Mr. Hadley. |
| Unknown date | Hampton | Gunboat | | Norfolk Navy Yard | Confederate States of America | For Confederate States Navy. |
| Unknown date | Hannah | Merchantman | T. Robson | Sunderland | United Kingdom | For E. Humphreys. |
| Unknown date | Hannah Sturdey | Merchantman | D. A. Douglas | Sunderland | United Kingdom | For Sturdey & Co. |
| Unknown date | Harriette Wardle | Brig | William Briggs & Son | Sunderland | United Kingdom | For J. Wardle & Co. |
| Unknown date | Hector | Steamship | Peck & Masters | Cleveland, Ohio | United States | For Daniel B. Odette. |
| Unknown date | Helen | Merchantman | G. & J. Mills | Sunderland | United Kingdom | For Mr. Hankey. |
| Unknown date | Helens | Merchantman | B. Hodgson | Sunderland | United Kingdom | For J. Smith. |
| Unknown date | Hercules | Fishing trawler | R. S. Abbott & Co. | Hull | United Kingdom | For George Thompson & William H. Brocklesby. |
| Unknown date | Hippodame | Tug | | Buffalo, New York | United States | For C. T. V. Copeland. |
| Unknown date | Hope | Merchantman | W. Pickersgill | Sunderland | United Kingdom | For P. Hick. |
| Unknown date | Huntress | Sternwheeler | | New Albany, Indiana | United States | For private owner. |
| Unknown date | Industry | Barque | | | United States | For private owner. |
| Unknown date | Iron Age | Steamship | | Kennebunk, Maine | United States | For private owner. |
| Unknown date | Isabella Thurlbeck | Merchantman | Liddle & Sutcliffe | North Hylton | United Kingdom | For Mr. Thurlbeck. |
| Unknown date | Isurium | Merchantman | J. Robinson | Sunderland | United Kingdom | For W. Lister. |
| Unknown date | James F. Freeborn | Tug | Lawrence & Foulks | New York | United States | For Richard Squires. |
| Unknown date | James Funk | Pilot boat | | Greenpoint, New York | United States | For New York Pilots. |
| Unknown date | James Rogers | Merchantman | George Barker | Sunderland | United Kingdom | For W. Rogers. |
| Unknown date | James Thompson | Paddle steamer | | Jeffersonville, Indiana | United Kingdom | For private owner. |
| Unknown date | Japan | Steamship | | | United Kingdom | For private owner. |
| Unknown date | John Slater | Merchantman | G. Bartram | Sunderland | United Kingdom | For Jervis & Co. |
| Unknown date | Joseph & Margaret | Merchantman | Gray & Young | Sunderland | United Kingdom | For Mr. Brown. |
| Unknown date | Joseph Thompson | Merchantman | John Blumer | Sunderland | United Kingdom | For Tully & Sons. |
| Unknown date | J. P. Billard | Tug | | Mystic, Connecticut | United States | For Copeland & Howe. |
| Unknown date | J. T. S. | Schooner | J. H. Watson | Sunderland | United Kingdom | For Fisher & Co. |
| Unknown date | Juliet | Sternwheeler | | Brownsville, Pennsylvania | United States | For private owner. |
| Unknown date | Kate | Steamship | Messrs. Dudgeon Bros. | Limehouse | United Kingdom | For private owner. |
| Unknown date | Kent | Merchantman | Marshall, or J. H. Watson | Sunderland | United Kingdom | For Mr. Marshall. |
| Unknown date | Key West | Steamship | | Brooklyn Navy Yard | United States | For private owner. |
| Unknown date | Key West No.8 | Sternwheeler | | California, Pennsylvania | United States | For W. S. Evans et al. |
| Unknown date | Lady Alicia | Merchantman | L. Wheatley | North Hylton | United Kingdom | For J. Blackwood. |
| Unknown date | Lass of Gawler | Clipper | | | United Kingdom | For private owner. |
| Unknown date | Lilian | Merchantman | G. W. Hall | Sunderland | United Kingdom | For Corry Bros. |
| Unknown date | Lily | Merchantman | John Blumer | Sunderland | United Kingdom | For Mr. Hick. |
| Unknown date | Lindisfarne | Merchantman | J. Errington | Sunderland | United Kingdom | For M. Aisbett. |
| Unknown date | Lodona | Steamship | Messrs. M. Samuelson & Co | Hull | United Kingdom | For Zachariah Charles Pearson. |
| Unknown date | Lombardie | Steamship | Messrs. Palmer, Brothers, & Co. | Jarrow | United Kingdom | For private owner. |
| Unknown date | Lumberman | Schooner | Allyne Litchfield | Blendon's Landing, Michigan | United States | For private owner. |
| Unknown date | Margaret | Merchantman | J. Errington | Sunderland | United Kingdom | For Fairley & Sons. |
| Unknown date | Margaret & Mary | Merchantman | Reay & Naisby | Sunderland | United Kingdom | For Mr. Sinclair. |
| Unknown date | Margaretta | Merchantman | W. Ratcliffe | Sunderland | United Kingdom | For T. Morris. |
| Unknown date | Marmora | Sternwheeler | William Latta | Monongahela, Pennsylvania | United States | For James McDonald. |
| Unknown date | Martha | Tug | Lawrence & Foulks | Williamsburg, New York | United States | For private owner. |
| Unknown date | Martlet | Merchantman | J. Haswell | Sunderland | United Kingdom | For Ayre & Co. |
| Unknown date | Mary | Merchantman | James Robinson | Sunderland | United Kingdom | For R. Dawson. |
| Unknown date | Mary Ann Curry | Barque | Robert Thompson Jr. | Sunderland | United Kingdom | For Thompson & Co. |
| Unknown date | Mary Jane | Schooner | Richard Tredwen | Padstow | United Kingdom | Known as The Sabbath Breaker as she became stuck on launch and freed herself the following Sunday. |
| Unknown date | Mary Sanford | Steamship | | Stonington, Connecticut | United States | For William R. Dinsmore. |
| Unknown date | Mayfield | Merchantman | B. Hodgson | Sunderland | United Kingdom | For Rae & Co. |
| Unknown date | Meggie Atkinson | Barque | Robert Thompson Jr. | Sunderland | United Kingdom | For M. Atkinson. |
| Unknown date | Messenger | Merchantman | Rawson & Watson | Sunderland | United Kingdom | For T. & J. Gallon. |
| Unknown date | Middleton | Snow | J. Reed | Sunderland | United Kingdom | For Mr. Middleton. |
| Unknown date | Mina | Clipper | | | United Kingdom | For The Passengers' Line. |
| Unknown date | Miriam | Merchantman | W. Pile | Sunderland | United Kingdom | For W. Boyle. |
| Unknown date | Moderation | Merchantman | T. Stonehouse | Sunderland | United Kingdom | For T. Dryden. |
| Unknown date | Monohansett | Sternwheeler | Thomas Collier | New York | United States | For New Bedford, Martha's Vineyard & Nantucket Steamboat Company. |
| Unknown date | Monitor | Tug | Eden Landing | San Francisco, California | United States | For William Mighell. |
| Unknown date | Morgan | Gunboat | | Mobile, Alabama | Confederate States of America | For Confederate States Navy. |
| Unknown date | Morning Star | Steamship | Alvin A. Turner | Trenton, Michigan | United States | For Detroit and Cleveland Navigation Company. |
| Unknown date | Nancy Brysson | Barque | T. Stonehouse | Sunderland | United Kingdom | For R. Whyte. |
| Unknown date | New Era | Sternwheeler | | Wellsville, Ohio | United States | For private owner. |
| Unknown date | Nil Desperandum | Snow | S. Peter Austin | Sunderland | United Kingdom | For Dove & Co. |
| Unknown date | Ocean Spray | Merchantman | James Robinson | Sunderland | United Kingdom | For Shotton & Co. |
| Unknown date | O. J. Walker | Schooner | | Burlington, Vermont | United States | For private owner. |
| Unknown date | Orion | Merchantman | C. Dunn | Sunderland | United Kingdom | For Dunn & Co. |
| Unknown date | Pasithea | Clipper | Messrs. Thomas Vernon & Co. | Liverpool | United Kingdom | For Liverpool Line of Packets. |
| Unknown date | Paul Jones Jr. | Tender | | | United States | For private owner. |
| Unknown date | Perseverance | Dandy | | Sunderland | United Kingdom | For Henry S. Macey. |
| Unknown date | Philia | Merchantman | G. & J. Mills | Sunderland | United Kingdom | For Ridley & Co. |
| Unknown date | Pioneer | Submarine | Horace Lawson Hunley, James McClintock and Baxter Watson | New Orleans, Louisiana | Confederate States of America | For Confederate States Navy. |
| Unknown date | Plover | Barque | J. Robinson | Sunderland | United Kingdom | For Potts Bros. |
| Unknown date | Puhlwan | Paddle steamer | A. Denny | Dumbarton | United Kingdom | For private owner. |
| Unknown date | Queen Bee | Barque | W. Naizby | Hylton | United Kingdom | For Mr. Davison. |
| Unknown date | Queen of the Age | Merchantman | W. Pile | Sunderland | United Kingdom | For Henry Ellis. |
| Unknown date | Redby | Merchantman | T. Robson | Sunderland | United Kingdom | For Reay & Co. |
| Unknown date | Rona | Steamship | Messrs. William Denny & Bros. | Dumbarton | United Kingdom | For Messrs. Jardine, Mathieson & Co. |
| Unknown date | Rosedale | Barque | J. & J. Brown | Sunderland | United Kingdom | For Shepherd & Co. |
| Unknown date | Ruth | Brig | J. & J. Brown | Sunderland | United Kingdom | For private owner. |
| Unknown date | San Juan | Snow | Gibbon & Nichol | Sunderland | United Kingdom | For T. Riley. |
| Unknown date | Sarah | Merchantman | W. Ratcliffe | Sunderland | United Kingdom | For Lawson & Co. |
| Unknown date | Sarah Ann | Merchantman | G. Bartram | Sunderland | United Kingdom | For Irvin & Co. |
| Unknown date | Sarah Burnyeat | Barque | James Hardie | Sunderland | United Kingdom | For George Watson. |
| Unknown ndate | Scotia | Paddle steamer | Messrs. J. & G. Thomson | Partick | United Kingdom | For Cunard Line. |
| Unknown date | Shaftesbury | Merchantman | T. R. Oswald | Sunderland | United Kingdom | For private owner. |
| Unknown date | Sheherd | Merchantman | J. Davison | Sunderland | United Kingdom | For Mr. Duthwate. |
| Unknown date | Signal | Sternwheeler | | Wheeling, Virginia | Confederate States of America | For private owner. |
| Unknown date | Silver Cloud | Sternwheeler | | Brownsville, Pennsylvania | United States | For private owner. |
| Unknown date | Silver Lake | Sternwheeler | | California, Pennsylvania | United States | For private owner. |
| Unknown date | Sir Harry Parkes | Merchantman | W. Pile | Sunderland | United Kingdom | For C. Pile. |
| Unknown date | Solomon Thomas | Steamship | | New York | United States | For C. W. Copeland. |
| Unknown date | Somerset | Ferry | | Brooklyn, New York | United States | For private owner. |
| Unknown date | Springbok | Merchantman | W. Pickersgill | Sunderland | United Kingdom | For R. Thompson. |
| Unknown date | Springfield | Sternwheeler | | Cincinnati, Ohio | United States | For private owner. |
| Unknown date | Star of the North | Merchantman | Taylor & Scouler | Sunderland | United Kingdom | For C. Alcock. |
| Unknown date | St. Clair | Sternwheeler | | Belle Vernon, Pennsylvania | United States | For R. D. Cochran et al. |
| Unknown date | Sunrise | Merchantman | W. Barclay | Sunderland | United Kingdom | For J. Hunter. |
| Unknown date | Sweet Brier | Tug | | Buffalo, New York | United States | For private owner. |
| Unknown date | Talisman | Aviso | | Havre de Grâce | France | For French Navy. |
| Unknown date | Terror | Tug | | St. Louis, Missouri | United States | For United States Army. |
| Unknown date | The Lord Warden | Merchantman | William Pile | Sunderland | United Kingdom | For Richard Green. |
| Unknown date | Thomas & Rebecca | Merchantman | J. Hutchinson | Sunderland | United Kingdom | For T. Watkins. |
| Unknown date | Three Brothers | Humber Keel | | | United Kingdom | For private owner. |
| Unknown date | Tirzah | Snow | Edward Potts | Seaham | United Kingdom | For Davison & Co. |
| Unknown date | Triad | Merchantman | D. A. Douglas | Sunderland | United Kingdom | For Branfoot & Co. |
| Unknown date | Union | Tug | | Philadelphia, Pennsylvania | United States | For private owner. |
| Unknown date | Union | Merchantman | Liddle & Sutcliffe | North Hylton | United Kingdom | For Winter & Co. |
| Unknown date | Victoria | Tug | Messrs. Marshall | South Shields | United Kingdom | For private owner. |
| Unknown date | Ville de Brest | Merchantman | James Laing | Sunderland | United Kingdom | For M. Jouvillier. |
| Unknown date | Ville de Havre | Merchantman | James Laing | Sunderland | United Kingdom | For M. Jouvillier. |
| Unknown date | Warwick | Merchantman | G. S. Moore | Sunderland | United Kingdom | For private owner. |
| Unknown date | Water Lily | Schooner | G. S. Moore | Sunderland | United Kingdom | For Robert H. Gayner. |
| Unknown date | Wearmouth | Merchantman | G. Short | Sunderland | United Kingdom | For Reay & Co. |
| Unknown date | Westoe | Barque | J. H. Watson | Sunderland | United Kingdom | For Mr. Usher. |
| Unknown date | White Rose | Sternwheeler | | Parkersburg, Virginia | Confederate States of America | For private owner. |
| Unknown date | William Duthie | Clipper | Messrs. Duthie & Co. | Aberdeen | United Kingdom | For private owner. |
| Unknown date | William G. Fargo | Steamship | | Buffalo, New York | United States | For Frank Perew. |
| Unknown date | Winchester | Full-rigged ship | George Marshall | Sunderland | United Kingdom | For G. Marshall. |
| Unknown date | Youngsters | Merchantman | J. Lister | Sunderland | United Kingdom | For Lister & Co. |
| Unknown date | Unnamed | Schooner | | Tar River | United States | For private owner. |
