= List of shipwrecks in January 1889 =

The list of shipwrecks in January 1889 includes ships sunk, foundered, grounded, or otherwise lost during January 1889.

== 1 January ==
List of shipwrecks: 1 January 1889
Ship	State	Description
Janet Jane	United Kingdom	The schooner ran aground at Sheerness, Kent. She was on a voyage from Hartlepool, County Durham to Rochester, Kent.
Loch Eck	United Kingdom	The full-rigged ship was driven ashore at Donna Nook, Lincolnshire. She was on a voyage from Queenstown, County Cork to Hull, Yorkshire. She was refloated. She was refloated and taken in to Hull.

== 2 January ==
List of shipwrecks: 2 January 1889
Ship	State	Description
Bilbao, Handel, and Ludgate Hill	Flag unknown United Kingdom; United Kingdom	The steamships Bilbao and Ludgate Hill collided in the River Thames at Gravesend, Kent. Both vessels were damaged. Bilbao subsequently backed into the steamship Handel, severely damaging her.
Boa Lambranca	Portugal	The schooner was run into by the steamship Lissaboa (Germany) at Lisbon. She consequently sank.
Krystal	Norway	The steamship collided with Umzinto (United Kingdom) in the River Thames. She was beached at Limehouse, Middlesex.
Isle of Elba	United Kingdom	The steamship ran aground in the River Ouse at Blacktoft, Yorkshire. She was on a voyage from Huelva, Spain to Goole, Yorkshire.
Optic	United Kingdom	The steamship ran aground.

== 3 January ==
List of shipwrecks: 3 January 1889
Ship	State	Description
Bivouac	United Kingdom	The steamship ran aground on The Swash, in the Bristol Channel off the coast of Somerset.

== 4 January ==
List of shipwrecks: 4 January 1889
Ship	State	Description
SMS Schwalbe	Imperial German Navy	The Schwalbe-class cruiser ran aground on a reef off Fungu Yasini Island, German East Africa. She was refloated on 6 January with assistance from SMS Leipzig (Imperial German Navy) and the hired steamship Woodcock (Royal Navy).

== 5 January ==
List of shipwrecks: 5 January 1889
Ship	State	Description
John Swan	United States	The brig was driven ashore and wrecked at Port Ellen, Argyllshire, United Kingdom. Her crew were rescued. She was on a voyage from Troon, Ayrshire, United Kingdom to Matanzas, Cuba.
Kenley	United Kingdom	The steamship collided with the steamship Pione (United Kingdom) and sank in the North Sea off Kessingland, Suffolk. Her crew were rescued. Kenley was on a voyage from Seaham, County Durham to Erith, Kent.
Montana	United Kingdom	The steamship was run into by the steamship Main (Germany) and sank in the Patapsco River. Montana was on a voyage from Baltimore, Maryland, United States to London.
Olive, and Severn	United Kingdom; France	The steamships collided in the Scheldt and were both severely damaged. Olive was on a voyage from Antwerp, Belgium to the River Tyne. She completed her voyage on 14 January and was taken into Wallsend, Northumberland for repairs.
Paris C. Brown	United States	The steamship struck a snag and sank in the Mississippi River at Hermitage, Louisiana with part of her superstructure above water. One passenger and six crew were killed. She was on a voyage from New Orleans, Louisiana to Cincinnati, Ohio.

== 6 January ==
List of shipwrecks: 6 January 1889
Ship	State	Description
Assinield, and Faedrelandet	Flag unknown	The steamships collided off Pera, Ottoman Empire. Both vessels were damaged.
Neptune	United Kingdom	The tug collided with London Bridge, London and was severely damaged.
Stabil	Norway	The barque was abandoned in the Atlantic Ocean. Her crew were rescued. She was on a voyage from Ayr, United Kingdom to Trinidad.

== 7 January ==
List of shipwrecks: 7 January 1889
Ship	State	Description
Argestes	United Kingdom	The brig was driven ashore opposite Lamlash, Isle of Arran. She was on a voyage from Ayr to Belfast, County Antrim.
Cyfartha	United Kingdom	The steamship collided with the steamship Maranhense (Flag unknown) in the River Mersey. She was beached and subsequently sank. Cyfartha was on a voyage from Huelva, Spain to Liverpool, Lancashire.
Espoirer	France	The barque was driven ashore and wrecked at The Mumbles, Glamorgan, United Kingdom with the loss of one of her fifteen crew. Survivors were rescued by the schooner Esther (United Kingdom).
Hispania	Netherlands	The steamship ran aground at Maassluis, South Holland. She was on a voyage from Bilbao, Spain to Rotterdam, South Holland.
Louise H.	United Kingdom	The steamship ran aground at Maassluis. She was on a voyage from Benisaf, Algeria to Rotterdam.
Margaret Hain	United Kingdom	The ship was wrecked neat Sant Feliu de Guíxols, Spain with the loss of six of her seven crew.
Ouse	United Kingdom	The steamship collided with the steamships Hansa (Germany) and Derwent'' (United Kingdom) at Hull, Yorkshire and was severely damaged.
Palma	United Kingdom	The steamship collided with the steamship Dundela (United Kingdom) off Orfordness, Suffolk Palma was on a voyage from Hartlepool, County Durham to Valencia, Spain. She put in to Harwich, Essex.
Scrivener	United Kingdom	The fishing smack was run into by the steamship Baron Clyde (United Kingdom) in the North Sea and was severely damaged. Scrivener was towed in to Ramsgate, Kent.
Wansfell	United Kingdom	The steamship ran aground on the Dunany Reefs, in the Irish Sea. She was on a voyage from Newport, Monmouthshire to Dundalk, County Louth. She was refloated and completed her voyage in a leaky condition.

== 8 January ==
List of shipwrecks: 8 January 1889
Ship	State	Description
Emerald	United Kingdom	The ketch foundered off Langstone, Hampshire. Her crew were rescued.
Epervier	France	The barque ran aground on the Scarweather Sands, in the Bristol Channel and sank with the loss of one of her sixteen crew. Survivors took to a raft; they were rescued by the schooner Esther (United Kingdom). Epervier was on a voyage from Bordeaux, Gironde to Cardiff, Glamorgan, United Kingdom.
Fortuna	Russia	The brig ran aground on the Berling Carr, off the coast of Northumberland, United Kingdom, on a voyage from Memel, Germany to the River Tyne. Three crew made it ashore in the ship's boat, and five were rescued by rocket apparatus. The ship's dog survived. Her captain refused to abandon ship, but was rescued on 12 January by the Alnmouth lifeboat Allen Scott ( RNLI). The vessel broke up soon afterwards.
Lily	United Kingdom	The tug was run into by the steamship Swan (United Kingdom) and sank in the River Thames.
Linda	Norway	The barque was driven ashore at Dungeness, Kent, United Kingdom. She was on a voyage from Sunderland, County Durham, United Kingdom to Africa.
Stad Nieuport	Flag unknown	The steamship collided with the steamship Unity (United Kingdom) at Goole, Yorkshire, United Kingdom and was beached. She was refloated the next day with the assistance of tugs.

== 9 January ==
List of shipwrecks: 9 January 1889
Ship	State	Description
Benacre	United Kingdom	The steamship was driven ashore at Garston, Lancashire. She was on a voyage from Huelva, Spain to Garston.
Brothock	United Kingdom	The steamship ran aground and sank at Newton Point, County Durham. Her crew survived. She was on a voyage from Middlesbrough, Yorkshire to Dundee, Forfarshire.
Coronet	United Kingdom	The steamship ran aground on The Platters, in the Irish Sea. She was refloated with assistance.
Crest	United Kingdom	The steamship was driven ashore at the Rammekens Castle, Zeeland, Netherlands. She was on a voyage from London to Antwerp, Belgium.
Italia	Italy	The steamship collided with the steamshio Docesse Balduino (Italy) at Genoa and was severely damaged.
Juliet	United States	The schooner foundered off Thacher's Island, Massachusetts with the loss of two of her crew.
Lady Katherine	United Kingdom	The steamship was driven ashore and wrecked at Newbiggin-by-the-Sea, Northumberland. Her eighteen crew were rescued by the Newbiggin Lifeboat Robert and Susan ( Royal National Lifeboat Institution ).
Leverington, and Lualaba	United Kingdom	The steamship Leverington was run into by the steamship Lualaba and sank in the River Mersey. Leverington was on a voyage from Cartagena, Spain to Garston, Lancashire. She was refloated the next day and taken in to Liverpool, Lancashire. Lualaba was on a voyage from Africa to Liverpool. She was beached, but was refloated and taken in to Liverpool.
Sir William Armstrong	United Kingdom	The steamship was driven ashore at North Shields, County Durham. She was on a voyage from London to North Shields. She was refloated the next day and taken in to South Shields, County Durham.
Staadsrath von Brück	Germany	The brig was driven ashore and wrecked at Scotstoun, Aberdeenshire, United Kingdom. Her ten crew were rescued. She was on a voyage from Rostock to Peterhead, Aberdeenshire.
Westward Ho	United Kingdom	The full-rigged ship was driven ashore in the Nieuwe Diep. She was on a voyage from Iquique, Chile to Hamburg, Germany.

== 10 January ==
List of shipwrecks: 10 January 1889
Ship	State	Description
Helen Marion	United Kingdom	The brig foundered in the Atlantic Ocean. Her crew were rescued by the barque Etha Rickmers (Germany). Helen Marion was on a voyage from Liverpool, Lancashire to Rosario, Argentina.
Herongate	United Kingdom	The steamship ran aground in the River Ouse at Goole, Yorkshire. She was on a voyage from Goole to London.
John Caspar	Germany	The barque collided with the steamship Deronda (United Kingdom) and was severely damaged. John Caspar was on a voyage from Burntisland, Fife, United Kingdom to Memel. She put in to Copenhagen, Denmark.

== 11 January ==
List of shipwrecks: 11 January 1889
Ship	State	Description
Loughbrough	United Kingdom	The ship ran aground in the River Ouse at Goole, Yorkshire. She was on a voyage from Huelva, Spain to Goole.
Priam	United Kingdom	The steamship ran aground in the Sisargas Islands, Spain with the loss of nine of the 47 people on board. Survivors were rescued by Spanish fishing boats. Priam was on a voyage from Liverpool, Lancashire to Hong Kong. She subsequently sank.

== 13 January ==
List of shipwrecks: 13 January 1889
Ship	State	Description
Kistna	United Kingdom	The steamship collided with the full-rigged ship Helicon (Germany) in the Hooghly River at Diamond Harbour, India and was severely damaged.
Probo	Italy	The barque was abandoned in the Atlantic Ocean (47°30′N 8°30′W). Her crew were rescued by the barque Diaz (Norway). Probo was on a voyage from Sharpness, Gloucestershire, United Kingdom to Buenos Aires, Argentina.
Pyah Pehket	Siam	The ship collided with Choppyah (Siam) and sank at the mouth of the Klang River with the loss of 42 of the 115 people on board.

== 14 January ==
List of shipwrecks: 14 January 1889
Ship	State	Description
Airlie	United Kingdom	The schooner's coal cargo ignited and, still on fire, she was run aground off Ashburton, Western Australia on 15 January, burning to the water's edge. She was on a voyage from Muara, Borneo to Fremantle, Western Australia; no crew casualties.
Elma	United Kingdom	The ship was severely damaged by fire at Millwall, Essex.

== 15 January ==
List of shipwrecks: 15 January 1889
Ship	State	Description
Arnold	Denmark	The ship was driven ashore at Kirton Head, Aberdeenshire, United Kingdom. Her five crew were rescued by the Peterhead Lifeboat. She was on a voyage from Iceland to Spain.

== 16 January ==
List of shipwrecks: 16 January 1889
Ship	State	Description
Ferona	Denmark	The schooner ran aground at Dysart, Fife, United Kingdom. She was on a voyage from Dysart to Faaborg. She was refloated and taken in to Dysart.
Lee	United Kingdom	The steamship lost her propeller in the Irish Sea off Holyhead, Anglesey. She was on a voyage from Liverpool, Lancashire to Cork. Her passengers were taken off by the Holyhead Lifeboat, which towed her in to Holyhead, where she was driven on to a rock.
Lee	United Kingdom	The steamship lost her propeller, which damaged her hull causing a severe leak, in the Irish Sea off Holyhead, Anglesey. Her passengers were taken off by the Holyhead Lifeboat. Lee was on a voyage from Liverpool, Lancashire to Cork. She was subsequently beached at Holyhead. Following temporary repairs, she was towed to Liverpool by two tugs.
Maglona	United Kingdom	The steamship collided with the steamship Bridget (United Kingdom) and sank off the Dowsing Sandbank, in the North Sea. Her crew were rescued by Drover (United Kingdom). Maglona was on a voyage from Seaham, County Durham to London.
Unknown vessel	Unknown	An unidentified barque of American build was found abandoned in the Atlantic at 48.5N 8.19W on 16 January. The schooner Edward Arthur (United Kingdom) of Carnarvon found the vessel in rough seas and was unable to read the name or see anyone on board.

== 17 January ==
List of shipwrecks: 17 January 1889
Ship	State	Description
Advance	United States	The schooner was wrecked on rocks at the southwest corner of the Pensacola Navy Yard, Pensacola, Florida.
Romulus	United Kingdom	The steamship was run into by the steamship Felgrano (France) and sank in the English Channel off the South Foreland, Kent with the loss of a crew member. Romulus was on a voyage from Sunderland, County Durham to Livorno, Kingdom of Italy.
Sarah Lightfoot	United Kingdom	The ship ran aground at the Weston Point Docks, Cheshire. She was on a voyage from Charlestown, Cornwall to Runcorn, Cheshire.
Urbano	United States	The barque was lost off Pensacola. Her crew were rescued. She was on a voyage from Buenos Aires, Argentina to Pensacola.

== 18 January ==
List of shipwrecks: 18 January 1889
Ship	State	Description
Mary	United Kingdom	The schooner collided with a steamship off Margate, Kent and was damaged.

== 19 January ==
List of shipwrecks: 19 January 1889
Ship	State	Description
Anglia, and Waverley	United Kingdom	The steamships collided in the East River and were both severely damaged. Anglia was on a voyage from a Mediterranean port to New York, United States. Waverley was on a voyage from New York to Calcutta, India.
Araminta	United Kingdom	The barque parted anchors and was driven ashore at Port Elizabeth, Cape Colony in a moderate gale. Her 13 crew and 2 passengers were rescued by lifeboat. The loss was found to be due to defective anchor cables
Benabourd	United Kingdom	The steamship suffered an engine room fire. She was on a voyage from Aberdeen to the River Tyne. She put back to Aberdeen.
Denbighshire	United Kingdom	The full-rigged ship was run into by the steamship Duke of Buckingham (United Kingdom) and sank 4 nautical miles (7.4 km) off Dungeness, Kent with the loss of two of her seventeen crew. Survivors were rescued by Duke of Buckingham and the tug Racer (United Kingdom). Denbighshire was being towed from Dunkirk, Nord, France to Cardiff, Glamorgan by Racer.

== 20 January ==
List of shipwrecks: 20 January 1889
Ship	State	Description
Allie Chester	United States	The schooner was wrecked on the Diamond Shoals, in the Atlantic Ocean off Cape Hatteras, North Carolina with the loss of seven of her ten crew. Survivors were rescued two days later by the schooner James Kelsey (United States). Allie Chester was on a voyage from Charleston, South Carolina to Barren Island, Maryland.

== 21 January ==
List of shipwrecks: 21 January 1889
Ship	State	Description
Elizabeth	United Kingdom	The schooner ran aground on the Goodwin Sands, Kent. She was refloated and taken in to The Downs.
H. F. Morse	United States	The tugboat was wrecked on Harding Ledge in Massachusetts Bay with the loss of a crew member.
Memling	United Kingdom	The steamship was wrecked at Cape Blanco. Her crew were rescued by the steamship Meuthe (France).
Two unnamed vessels	United States	Two barges were wrecked when their tug H. F. Morse was wrecked on Harding Ledge in Massachusetts Bay. Five crewmen were killed between the two crews.

== 22 January ==
List of shipwrecks: 22 January 1889
Ship	State	Description
Lofna	United Kingdom	The steamship collided with the steamship Vannina (France) at Bordeaux, Gironde, France and was severely damaged. Lofna was on a voyage from Bordeaux to Cardiff, Glamorgan.

== 23 January ==
List of shipwrecks: 23 January 1889
Ship	State	Description
Dundee	United Kingdom	The barge collided with the hulk Trinity (United Kingdom) and capsized in the River Thames at Blackwall, Middlesex. The lighterman on board was rescued by Trinity.
Pennon	United Kingdom	The steamship was driven ashore on Aisla Craig. She was on a voyage from the River Duddon to Glasgow, Renfrewshire.

== 24 January ==
List of shipwrecks: 24 January 1889
Ship	State	Description
Bartie Pierce	United States	The schooner was wrecked on Cape Island, Nova Scotia, Canada. Her crew were rescued.
Benbrack	United Kingdom	The steamship was stranded on Texel, North Holland, Netherlands. She was on a voyage from Savannah, Georgia to Bremen, Germany with cotton. Cargo recovered by March 1889 and ship scrapped in situ in 1890.
Ceres	United Kingdom	The brigantine was driven ashore at Whitby, Yorkshire. She was on a voyage from Great Yarmouth, Norfolk to the River Tyne. She was refloated and taken in to Whitby.
City of Cork	United Kingdom	The steamship ran aground in the River Thames.
Kestrel	United Kingdom	The steamship ran aground in the River Thames at Blackwall, Middlesex.

== 25 January ==
List of shipwrecks: 25 January 1889
Ship	State	Description
Jacobus	Netherlands	The ship departed from Rochester, Kent for Leith, Lothian, United Kingdom. No further trace, reported missing.

== 26 January ==
List of shipwrecks: 26 January 1889
Ship	State	Description
Confidence, and Content	United Kingdom	The Thames barges were run into by the steamship Devonshire (United Kingdom) and sank in the River Thames at Northfleet, Kent. The captains of both vessels drowned, a crew member from each vessel survived.

== 27 January ==
List of shipwrecks: 27 January 1889
Ship	State	Description
No. 5	Belgium	The pilot boat, a schooner, was run into by the steamship Ardanach (United Kingdom) and sank in the English Channel 3 nautical miles (5.6 km) off the Royal Sovereign Lightship ( Trinity House). All fourteen people on board were rescued by Ardanach.

== 28 January ==
List of shipwrecks: 28 January 1889
Ship	State	Description
Hedwig	Germany	The barque ran aground at the Turneffe Atoll, British Guiana. She was refloated but found to be severely leaky.
Little Beauty	United Kingdom	The ship departed from Figueira da Foz, Portugal for Mevagissey, Cornwall. No further trace, reported overdue.

== 29 January ==
List of shipwrecks: 29 January 1889
Ship	State	Description
Pinmore	United Kingdom	The full-rigged ship ran aground on the Curlane Bank, off Queenstown, County Cork.
Sir Walter Raleigh	United Kingdom	The ship was driven ashore at Audreselles, Pas-de-Calais, France with the loss of six of her 28 crew. She was on a voyage from Sydney, New South Wales to London.

== 30 January ==
List of shipwrecks: 30 January 1889
Ship	State	Description
Broomhall, and Horizon	United Kingdom; France)	The barque Broomhall and the full-rigged ship Horizon collided at Pisagua, Chile. Both vessels were severely damaged.
Budapest	United Kingdom	The steamship departed from Newport, Monmouthshire for Las Palmas, Canary Islands. No further trace, reported missing.
Sarah Jane	United Kingdom	The tug sank at Wapping, Middlesex.
Thalassos	Norway	The ship departed from Newcastle upon Tyne, Northumberland, United Kingdom for Rio de Janeiro, Brazil. No further trace, reported missing.

== 31 January ==
List of shipwrecks: 31 January 1889
Ship	State	Description
Cockroach	United Kingdom	The hopper barge was run into by a steamship that was being launched at Hebburn-on-Tyne, County Durham. She consequently sank.
Kestrel	United Kingdom	The steamship collided with the steamship Stockton (United Kingdom) in the River Thames at Deptford, Kent and was severely damaged.
Queen of the Isles	United Kingdom	The brig was damaged by fire at Hartlepool, County Durham.

== Unknown date ==
List of shipwrecks: Unknown date in January 1889
Ship	State	Description
Adelaide Baker	United Kingdom	The barque was driven ashore and wrecked at Key West, Florida, United States. Her crew were rescued. She was on a voyage from Pensacola, Florida to Grangemouth, Stirlingshire.
Aljuca	Norway	The ship was driven ashore. She was on a voyage from Skutskär, Sweden to London, United Kingdom. She was refloated and taken in to Kristiansand in a leaky condition.
Alliance	United Kingdom	The steamship ran aground at Ringsend, County Dublin.
Amalfi	Germany	The steamship ran aground in the Elbe at Schulau. She was on a voyage from Hamburg to New York, United States.
America, and an unnamed vessel	United Kingdom	The steamship America collided with a barge at Blackwall, Middlesex and was beached. The barge sank.
Amoor	United Kingdom	The steamship was driven ashore at the mouth of the Patapsco River. She was on a voyage from Baltimore, Maryland, United States to Tralee, County Kerry.
Amyone	United Kingdom	The barque ran aground in Lough Foyle. She was refloated and taken in to Londonderry.
Arbutus	United Kingdom	The barque was abandoned at sea. Her crew were rescued by Nether Holme (United Kingdom).
Augusta	Denmark	The schooner was driven ashore. She was on a voyage from Newcastle upon Tyne, Northumberland, United Kingdom to Holbæk. She was refloated and put in to Fredrikshavn in a severely leaky condition.
August Leffler	Norway	The barque was driven ashore. She was refloated and taken in to Savannah, Georgia, United States in a dismasted and leaky condition.
Aurora	Italy	The barque was driven ashore on the Warsaw Breakers, off the coast of Georgia, United States.
Bakuin	United Kingdom	The steamship ran aground in the Elbe. She was on a voyage from Batoum, Russia to Hamburg. She was refloated and completed her voyage.
Baron Clyde	United Kingdom	The steamship was driven ashore at "Villez Martin", Loire-Inférieure, France.
Bempton	United Kingdom	The steamship was driven ashore at Nantucket, Massachusetts, United States. She was refloated and taken in to Boston, Massachusetts, where she arrived on 1 February. Bempton was placed under repair.
Berlin	United Kingdom	The steamship was driven ashore in the River Ouse near Goole, Yorkshire. She was later refloated and towed in to Hull, Yorkshire.
Brilliant	United Kingdom	The barque ran aground in the Elbe. She was refloated and resumed her voyage.
Clan Murray	United Kingdom	The steamship was driven ashore at Terneuzen, Zeeland, Netherlands. She was on a voyage from Bombay, India to Antwerp, Belgium. She was later refloated with the assistance of four tugs and completed her voyage.
Carlos 40	Argentina	The schooner was lost off "Castellos".
Carolina	Sweden	The steamship was driven ashore at Manavgat, Ottoman Empire.
Carskey	United Kingdom	The smack sprang a severe leak and was beached at Lamlash, Ayrshire. She was on a voyage from Irvine, Ayrshire to Campbeltown, Argyllshire.
Charles A. Hoard	United Kingdom	The barque was driven ashore at Maryport, Cumberland. She was on a voyage from Belfast, County Antrim to Maryport.
Charles S. Whitney	United Kingdom	The full-rigged ship ran aground on the Bay St. Nicholas Shoal. She was on a voyage from Yloilo to Manila, Spanish East Indies and New York.
Comorin	United Kingdom	The steamship ran aground in the River Mersey at Garston, Lancashire. She was on a voyage from Glasgow, Renfrewshire to Liverpool, Lancashire.
Condora	United Kingdom	The steamship was driven ashore at Wells-next-the-Sea, Norfolk.
Delhi	United Kingdom	The brig ran aground at Teignmouth, Devon.
Derbyshire	United Kingdom	The steamship ran aground in the Elbe at Schulau.
Dragonfly	United Kingdom	The steamship ran aground in the Elbe at Finkenwerder, Germany. She was on a voyage from Dedeagach, Ottoman Empire to Hamburg.
Earnmoor	United Kingdom	The steamship was driven ashore at Philadelphia, Pennsylvania, United States.
Erin	United Kingdom	The steamship was abandoned in the Atlantic Ocean. Her crew were rescued. She was on a voyage from Baltimore, Maryland to Jamaica.
Ethel	United Kingdom	The schooner was driven ashore at Bakeri Point, Greece. She was later refloated and put in to Patras, Greece.
Excelsior	United Kingdom	The ship was abandoned at sea. Her crew were rescued by the steamship Moselle (Flag unknown).
Fennia	United Kingdom	The steamship was wrecked at "Surup".
Flecke Jovwer	Netherlands	The schooner ran aground off "Dracko", Denmark. She was on a voyage from Riga, Russia to Harlingen, Friesland. She was refloated with assistance and taken in to Helsingør, Denmark.
Forest Queen	United Kingdom	The steamship was run into by the steamship Rutland (United Kingdom) in the River Thames at Barking, Essex and was severely damaged. Forest Queen was on a voyage from Goole to London. She was beached.
Foster	United States	The schooner was wrecked in the Cayman Islands. She was on a voyage from Savannah-la-Mar, Jamaica to Mobile, Alabama.
Freidleif	Norway	The barque was driven ashore at Veracruz, Mexico. She was consequently condemned.
George	United Kingdom	The schooner was wrecked on Carmel Head, Anglesey. Her crew were rescued. She was on a voyage from Douglas, Isle of Man to Liverpool.
Giovanni A.	Italy	The barque ran aground on the Marquesas Keys, Florida, United States and was abandoned. She was on a voyage from Pensacola, Florida to Montevideo, Uruguay. She was refloated and taken in to Key West, Florida.
Glenlora	United Kingdom	The barque was run down and sunk at Cuxhaven, Germany by the steamship Ludwig Rossehl (Germany). Her crew were rescued.
G. N. Wilkinson	United Kingdom	The steamship collided with Sjælland (Denmark) and sank off Penarth, Glamorgan. She was refloated and taken in to Penarth.
Hampshire	United Kingdom	The steamship ran aground in the Elbe at Schulau. She was on a voyage from the Black Sea to Hamburg.
Hassan Pacha	Ottoman Empire	The steamship ran aground in Gallipoli Bay. She was on a voyage from Constantinople to Alexandria, Egypt.
Helen Newton	United Kingdom	The steamship was driven ashore at Tripoli, Ottoman Tripolitania. She was later refloated.
Hiberian	United Kingdom	The steamship was driven ashore on Walney Island, Lancashire.
Hispania	Netherlands	The steamship ran aground at Maassluis, South Holland. She was on a voyage from Bilbao, Spain to Rotterdam, South Holland. She was refloated.
Holmside	United Kingdom	The steamship collided with the steamship Braemar (United Kingdom) and sank off the Haisborough Sands, in the North Sea off the coast of Norfolk. Her nineteen crew were rescued. Holmside was on a voyage from Newcastle upon Tyne, Northumberland to London.
Iron King	United Kingdom	The tug was driven ashore at Scarborough, Yorkshire. She subsequently became a wreck.
Itroma	United Kingdom	The steamship struck a sunken wreck at Panama City, Colombia and was holed.
Jupiter	Russia	The barque became icebound and was abandoned. Her crew were rescue by Morao (Flag unknown). Jupiter was on a voyage from Rotterdam to Riga.
Kehrweider	Germany	The steamship ran aground in the Elbe at Schulau. She was on a voyage from Hamburg to the River Plate. She was refloated, but ran aground again.
Lady Lycett	United Kingdom	The steamship ran aground in the Elbe. She was on a voyage from Sevastopol, Russia to Hamburg.
Lavinia Campbell	United States	The schooner collided with the steamship Macedonia (United Kingdom) in the Patapsco River and sank.
Lisbonense	United Kingdom	The steamship ran aground in the Elbe at Schulau. She was on a voyage from Hamburg to Maranhão, Brazil.
Louisa	United Kingdom	The barge was run into by the brigantine Bessey Whineray and sank in the River Thames at Woolwich, Kent.
Louise H.	United Kingdom	The steamship ran aground at Maassluis. She was on a voyage from Benisaf, Algeria to Rotterdam. She was refloated.
Lucil	Germany	The ship was damaged by ice. She put in to Altona in a waterlogged condition.
Magdalena	Italy	The barque was wrecked on the Morant Cays. Her crew were rescued. She was on a voyage from Buenos Aires, Argentina to Pensacola, Florida.
Maggie	United Kingdom	The ship was wrecked at Penedo, Brazil. Also reported a vessel of that name wrecked at Maceió, Brazil.
Mercator	Germany	The steamship ran aground in the Elbe at Lühe. She was on a voyage from "Taetal" to Hamburg. She was refloated and completed her voyage.
Merida	Germany	The schooner was damaged by ice in the Elbe. She was beached at Brokdorf. She was on a voyage from Hamburg to Veracruz.
Moorgog	United Kingdom	The steamship ran aground at Northfleet, Kent before 8 January.
Moravia	Germany	The steamship ran aground in the Elbe at Schulau. She was on a voyage from New York to Hamburg.
Morning Star	United Kingdom	The steamship foundered off the Irish coast, according to a message in a bottle that washed up at Saltcoats, Ayrshire on 16 January.
Normand	France	The steamship was driven ashore at Swansea, Glamorgan. She was on a voyage from La Calle, Algeria to Swansea.
Oevelgonne	Germany	The steamship ran aground on the Lühesand, in the Elbe. She was on a voyage from New York to Hamburg. She was later refloated and completed her voyage.
Penguin	Norway	The schooner ran aground at Tamatave, Madagascar. She was refloated and taken in to Mauritius.
Professor Woermann	Germany	The steamship was holed by ice in the Elbe. She was on a voyage from Hamburg to an African port. She put in to Portland, Dorset, United Kingdom for repairs on 17 January.
Quaker City, and Victor	United States; United Kingdom	The schooner Quaker City collided with the barque Victor and sank. Her crew were rescued by Victor. Victor was severely damaged. She put in to Galveston, Texas, United States.
Queen of the Fleet	United Kingdom	The ship collided with a coaster at Rosario, Argentina and was severely damaged.
Renown	United Kingdom	The steamship was driven ashore at the Contis Lighthouse, Landes, France. Her crew were rescued.
Rhodora	United Kingdom	The steamship ran aground in the Elbe. She was refloated and resumed her voyage.
Sandringham	United Kingdom	The steamship ran aground in the Elbe. She was on a voyage from Boston, Lincolnshire to Hamburg, Germany.
Sapphire	United Kingdom	The steamship ran aground at Saltholm, Denmark. She was refloated and towed in to Copenhagen, Denmark.
Statsraad Broch	Germany	The ship was driven ashore 3 nautical miles (5.6 km) north of Peterhead, Aberdeenshire, United Kingdom. Her crew were rescued. She was a total loss.
Stroma	United Kingdom	The steamship struck a submerged object at Panama City, Colombia and was holed. She was subsequently repaired and resumed her voyage on 17 January.
Sussex	United Kingdom	The steamship ran aground in the Elbe at Finkenwerder. She was on a voyage from Hamburg to Singapore, Straits Settlements. She was refloated and resumed her voyage.
Taiynan	United Kingdom	The steamship was driven ashore on Palawan, Spanish East Indies. She was refloated and taken in to Manila, Spanish East Indies in a leaky condition.
Tenasserim	United Kingdom	The ship ran aground in the Hooghly River.
True Briton	United Kingdom	The ship was wrecked on a reef 35 nautical miles (65 km) off Key West, Florida in late January. Her crew survived.
Unnamed	Flag unknown	The steamship ran aground on the Pagensand, in the North Sea off the German coast.
