= SS Arago =

Wooden hulled, brig-rigged, sidewheel steamer built in 1855

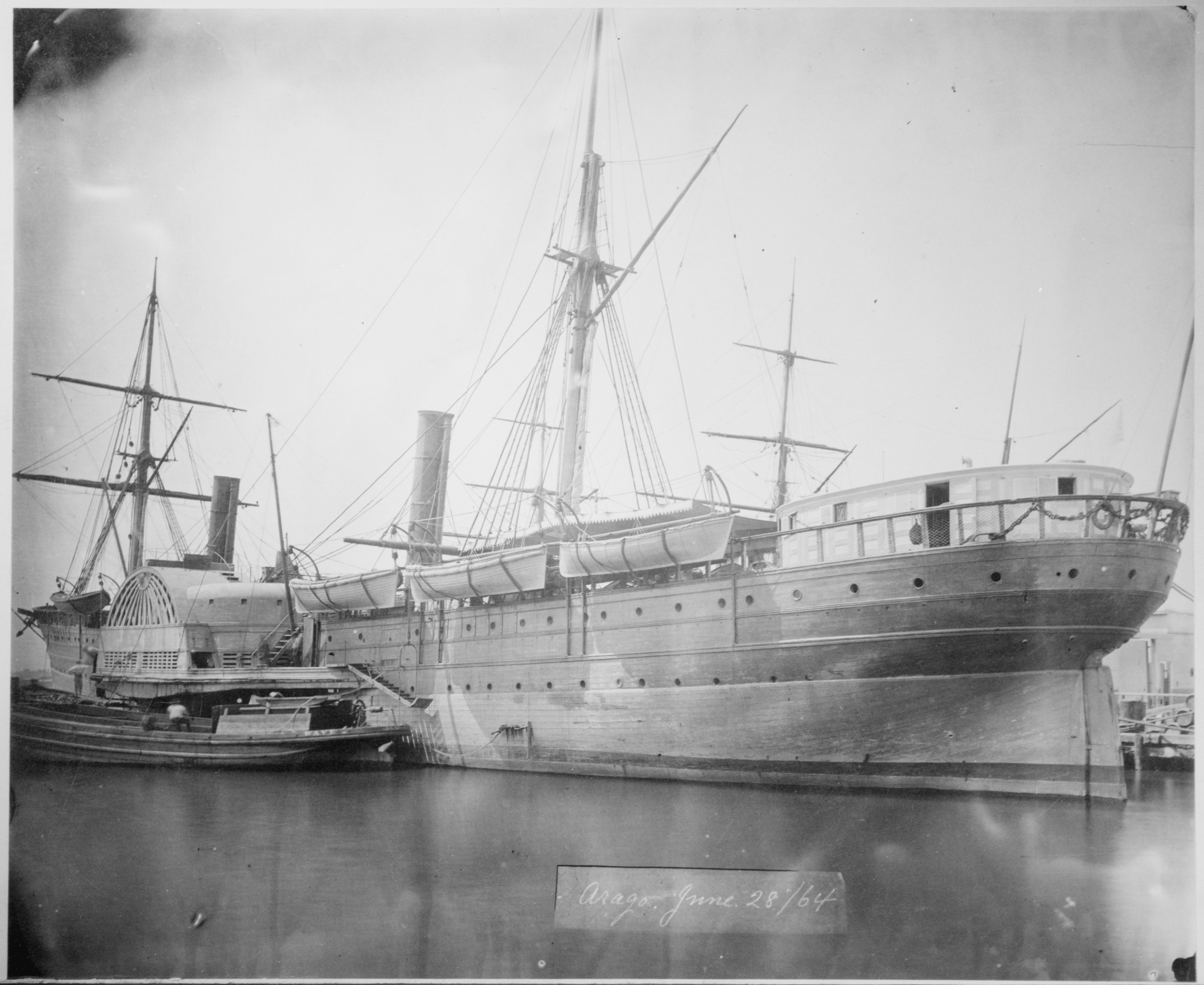
- Arago in 1864

History

United States
- Name: Arago
- Owner: New York & Havre Steam Navigation Company
- Operator: Captain Henry A. Gadsden
- Port of registry: United States 1855-1869; Peru 1869-
- Builder: Jacob A. Westervelt's Sons & Company, New York, New York
- Launched: January 27, 1855
- Completed: 1855
- Maiden voyage: June 2, 1855
- Fate: Sold to Peruvian Government, 1869

General characteristics
- Type: Wooden-hull Sidewheel steamer
- Tonnage: 2,240 GRT
- Length: 295 feet
- Beam: 40 feet
- Installed power: Two oscillating steam engine by Novelty Iron Works of New York
- Propulsion: Iron Paddle Wheels, 33 feet diameter
- Speed: 12 knots (22 km/h)
- Armament: 4 rifled cannon (of unknown caliber)

The Arago was a wooden hulled, brig-rigged, sidewheel steamer built in 1855 by Westervelt & Sons at New York, New York. Chartered by the Union Army in the Army Transport Service, during the American Civil War for use as a troop transport and in operation with the South Atlantic Blockading Squadron throughout the war, Arago was the ship that returned the United States flag to Fort Sumter in April 1865. Returned to transatlantic passenger and freight service after the Civil War, she was sold to the Peruvian government in 1869.

== Construction ==
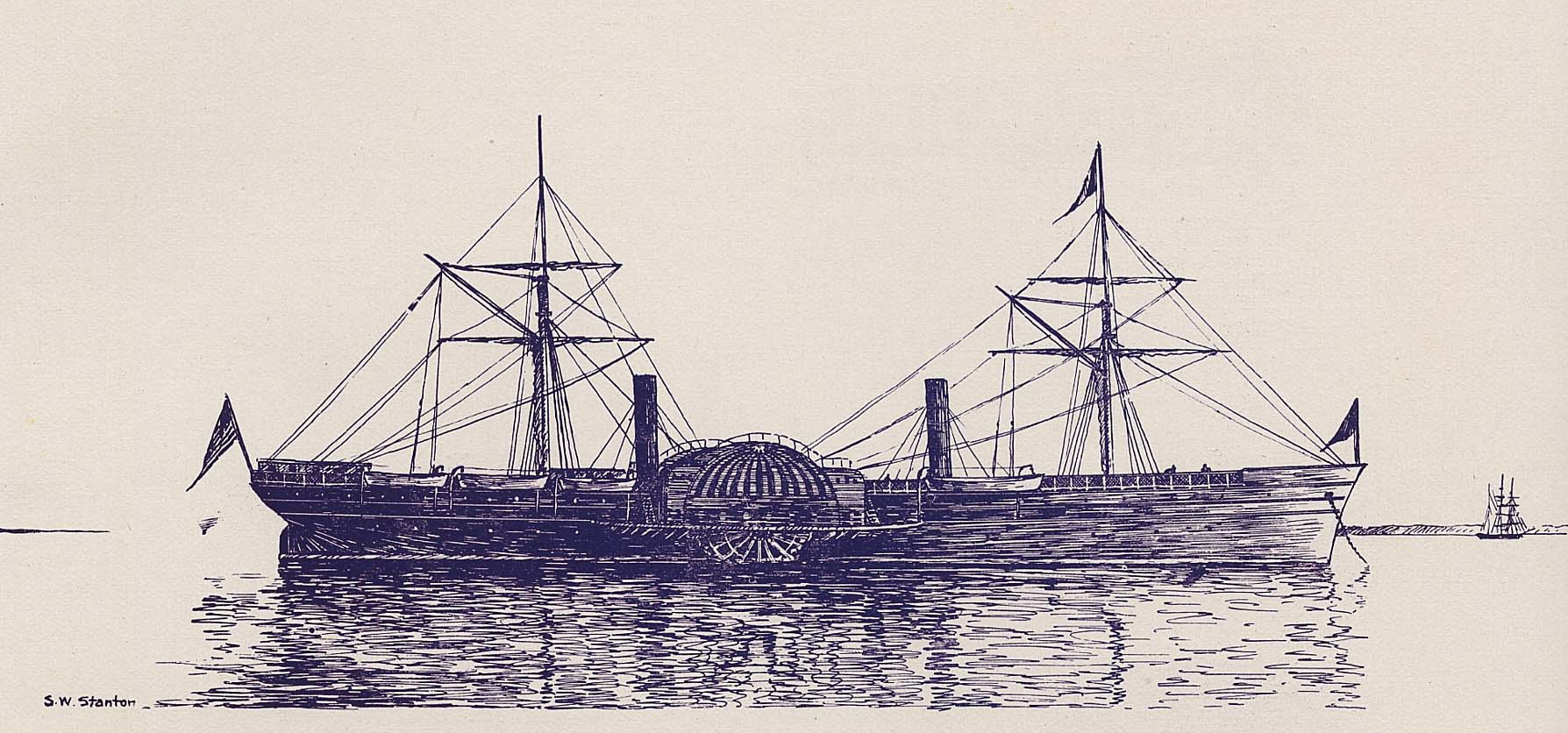
Arago (1855)

The Arago, built by Westervelt and Sons, and her sister ship SS Fulton launched 4 September 1855, built by Smith and Dimon of New York, were constructed in 1855 for the New York & Havre Steam Navigation Company, then under contract with the United States Government to deliver mail between New York and Havre. Both named for steamship pioneers, Arago's namesake was François Arago (1786–1853), a French physicist. Considered great improvements to their predecessors of the era, their design included oscillating engines, water tight bulkheads, and wire bulwarks, to reinforce the sides against the force of rough seas. Specifically built to replace the Humboldt, lost in Halifax, Nova Scotia on December 5, 1853, on the New York to Havre route, she cost 450,000 dollars to build.

Launched in January 1855, Arago made her maiden voyage, with Captain David Lines in command, on June 2, 1855. Along with over 450,000 dollars in specie, her 215 passengers that trip included prince J. Bonaparte, the honorable Aaron Vail, and newspaperman G. W. Kendall.

== Service history ==
From her first voyage in 1855 through March 1861, Arago operated as a transatlantic mail steamer, transporting passengers, cargo, mail, and specie between her home port of New York, Southampton, Liverpool and Le Havre.

The Arago was registered as a pilot Schooner with the ‘’Record of American and Foreign Shipping,’’ from 1858 to 1969. Her ship master was Captain Gadden; her owners were N.Y. & Havre Steam Navigation Company; built in 1855 at New York; and her hailing port was the Port of New York.

In June 1859, abolitionist Gamaliel Bailey died aboard the Arago en route to Europe.

It was the Arago which, in December 1859, returned Senator Seward from his eight-month tour of Europe and the Middle East, to begin his unsuccessful bid for the Republican Presidential nomination.

Due to the outbreak of the American Civil War, government contracted mail service ceased with the Arago's last voyage in this capacity, beginning from New York on March 30, 1861.

=== American Civil War ===
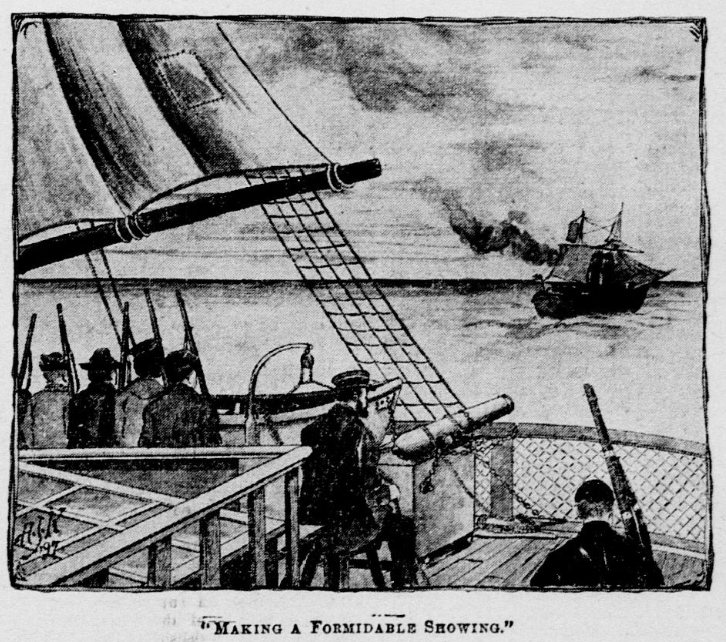
Artist's depiction of Arago capturing the blockade runner Emma, 1863

Between 1861 and 1865, Arago was chartered by the U. S. Department of War in the Army Transport Service, for use as an army transport, at a cost of 1,200 dollars per day. During 1861, prior to Captain Lines becoming president of the company, he and Captain Henry A. Gadsden alternatively commanded Arago.

In November 1861, retired General Winfield Scott and newspaper publisher Thurlow Weed sailed to Europe in the Arago (Captain Lines in command). Advertised as a vacation tour, General Scott's visit was to secure French support should Great Britain fight against the Union. Shortly after they left New York, the USS San Jacinto intercepted the RMS Trent and removed two Confederate diplomats, James Mason and John Slidell, provoking what immediately became known as the Trent Affair. General Scott, after seeking counsel with Prince Bonaparte, cut short his visit by several months, and returned to New York after only 47 days. Prior to leaving Paris, General Scott signed a letter assuring the French and English governments that the action by San Jacinto's Captain, Charles Wilkes, was neither ordered nor approved by the government. General Scott's opportune timing and prompt action helped prevent war with Great Britain.

In December, on her way to Southampton, there was some concern for her and her passengers' safety, as the Confederate privateer Nashville had sailed into that port two days prior to Arago's scheduled arrival. Given the Nashville had just boarded and burned the American merchant ship, Harvey Birch, many Americans feared the Arago and her celebrated passengers would suffer the same fate. Those fears proved to be unwarranted, and Arago returned home to New York by the end of that month.

Captain Gadsden took full command of Arago soon thereafter, and remained in command throughout the end of the war, and immediately after.

For a brief period between March and April 1862, the War Department transferred Arago's charter to the U.S. Navy Department, as ordered by Secretary of War, Edwin Stanton, for "extra hazardous employment". The Confederate ironclad CSS Virginia had rampaged Union ships at Hampton Roads, Virginia. The steam ships Arago, Vanderbilt, Illinois and Ericsson, were ordered to Hampton Roads where, using their better speed and newly installed iron prows, were to ram the Virginia should she again put out to open water. The civilian crews of the Illinois and Arago were not informed of their suicide mission until their arrival in Hampton Roads. Despite Captain Gadsden's efforts, many of the crew refused duty, left the ship and returned to New York. The remaining crew was augmented by naval officers and other civilians, including nine runaway slaves from Virginia who were employed as "coal heavers". After the Virginia was scuttled to prevent her capture following the Confederate retreat from Norfolk, the Arago was removed from this duty and, with a civilian crew, returned to transporting troops and equipment for the Union army.

On July 26, 1863 the Arago, filled to near capacity with wounded, sick, discharged and dead soldiers from the battles at Fort Sumter and Fort Wagner, including an ailing General George Crockett Strong, fell in behind an unknown ship off Wilmington, North Carolina. After watching the ship speed up and drop cotton bales and other items over the side, Captain Gadsden, after consulting the military officers on board, gave chase. After seven hours, Arago overtook the slower ship, leading to the capture of the Confederate blockade-runner Emma. Despite both ships having weapons aboard, not a shot was fired during the chase and subsequent capture.

Arago continued in her troop, equipment and mail transport role through the end of the war. On May 8, 1865, the Fort Sumter Flag, in its original Fort Sumter mail-bag (addressed "Major Anderson, Fort Sumter, April 14, 1865), was removed from its vault in New York's Bank of Commerce, and loaded aboard the Arago, along with Major General Robert Anderson, Sergeant Peter Hart, numerous dignitaries and their families. Arago delivered the flag and its entourage to Fort Sumter where, four years to the day it was lowered in surrender by then Major Anderson and Private Hart, it was again raised by them in celebration of the Union's victory.

=== Postwar ===
Following the war her owners, the New York and Havre Line, gave her a general overhaul, including new boilers, repainting inside and out, and newly furnished staterooms and cabins. With the hope for her to regain her pre-war transatlantic glory, Arago left New York on November 25, 1865, with Captain Henry A. Gadsden still in command, with 40 cabin passengers and a cargo of cotton. Despite being sold in December 1866, she remained in this capacity until the autumn of 1867, when she was withdrawn from service.

In 1868–1869, Arago and her sister ship Fulton were chartered briefly by the Ruger Brothers for passenger service. However, without government subsidized mail service, both ships proved too costly for this purpose, given the stiff competition from more efficient screw steamers and European competitors. In mid December 1868, Arago survived a devastating storm at sea, while transiting from New York to Falmouth, England.

After making two round-trip voyages for Ruger American Lines, Arago was sold to the Peruvian government in 1869. Fulton was deemed to be unseaworthy and broken up for scrap. Shortly after Arago's departure for Peru in early May, and before changing her flag, claims were made she had loaded up with mercenaries, arms and supplies to support revolutionists in Cuba. That later proved to be unfounded. As late as 1912, she was believed to still be in Peruvian service.
