= USS Emma (1863) =

Steamer

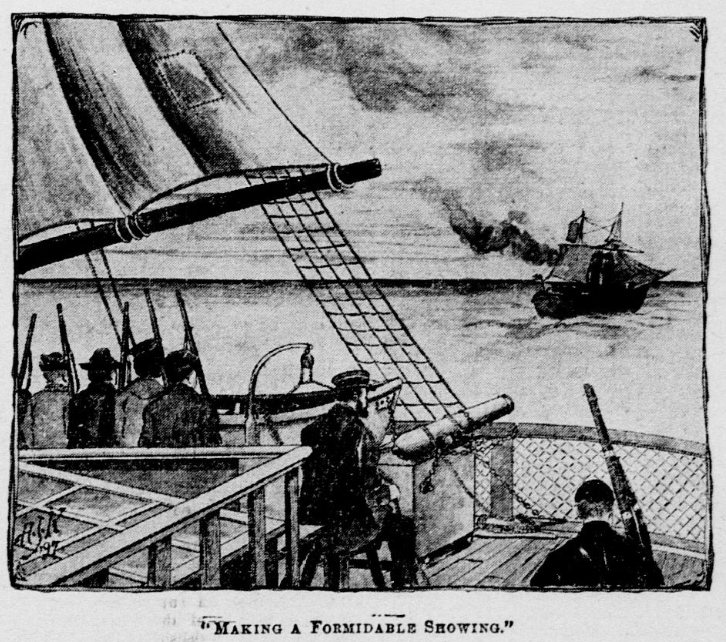
- Capture of the blockade runner Emma, 1863.

History

United States
- Builder: Barclay Curle
- Laid down: date unknown
- Launched: 24 November 1862
- Acquired: 30 September 1863
- Commissioned: 4 November 1863
- Decommissioned: 30 August 1865
- Stricken: 1865 (est.)
- Captured: by Union Navy forces, 24 July 1863
- Fate: Sold, 1 November 1865

General characteristics
- Displacement: 350 tons
- Length: 156 ft (48 m)
- Beam: 21 ft (6.4 m)
- Draught: 9 ft 4 in (2.84 m)
- Propulsion: Greenock Foundry Company steam engine; screw-propelled
- Speed: 12 knots
- Complement: 68
- Armament: six 24-pounder howitzers; two 12-pounder rifles

The first USS Emma was a steamer captured by the Union Navy during the American Civil War. She was used by the Union Navy as a picket and patrol vessel on Confederate waterways.

== Emma captured and placed into Union Navy service ==
Emma, a single-screw steamer, was built in Glasgow, Scotland for Thomas S. Begbie. Emma and her sister ship, Gertrude were named for Begbie's two daughters. Emma was captured on 24 July 1863 by the Army transport SS Arago off the coast of Wilmington, North Carolina on its third voyage. Purchased by the Navy from the New York City prize court on 30 September 1863; it was fitted out at New York Navy Yard; and put to sea on 4 November 1863, Acting Master G. B. Livingston in command.

== Assigned to patrol with the North Atlantic Blockade ==
Emma arrived at Newport News, Virginia, 7 November 1863 to patrol with the North Atlantic Blockading Squadron until the end of the war. Enforcing the blockade, she played a significant role in the Navy's indispensable contribution to victory through isolating the South from oversea sources of supply. Emma joined in the destruction of blockade runner Ella off Wilmington, North Carolina, 6 December 1864, and the attacks on Fort Fisher of 24 and 25 December 1864 and 13 to 15 January 1865.

== Supporting the effort to prevent Jefferson Davis from fleeing ==
On 26 April 1865, Emma sailed from Fort Caswell, North Carolina, with an urgent message from General William Tecumseh Sherman to Rear Admiral John A. Dahlgren, commanding the South Atlantic Blockading Squadron, which warned the Admiral that Confederate President Jefferson Davis and his cabinet, not yet located, might attempt to escape by way of Florida to Cuba. Emma put into Key West, Florida, on this cruise, then returned to patrol the Carolina coast until 24 August, when she arrived at Boston, Massachusetts.

== End-of-war decommissioning and disposal ==
In Boston, Emma was decommissioned 30 August 1865 and sold 1 November 1865.

She was placed back in service as a merchant steamer, operated as the SS Gaspe, from 1866 until her sinking near Miquelon Island on 14 June 1872.
