= USS Gertrude =

Gunboat of the United States Navy

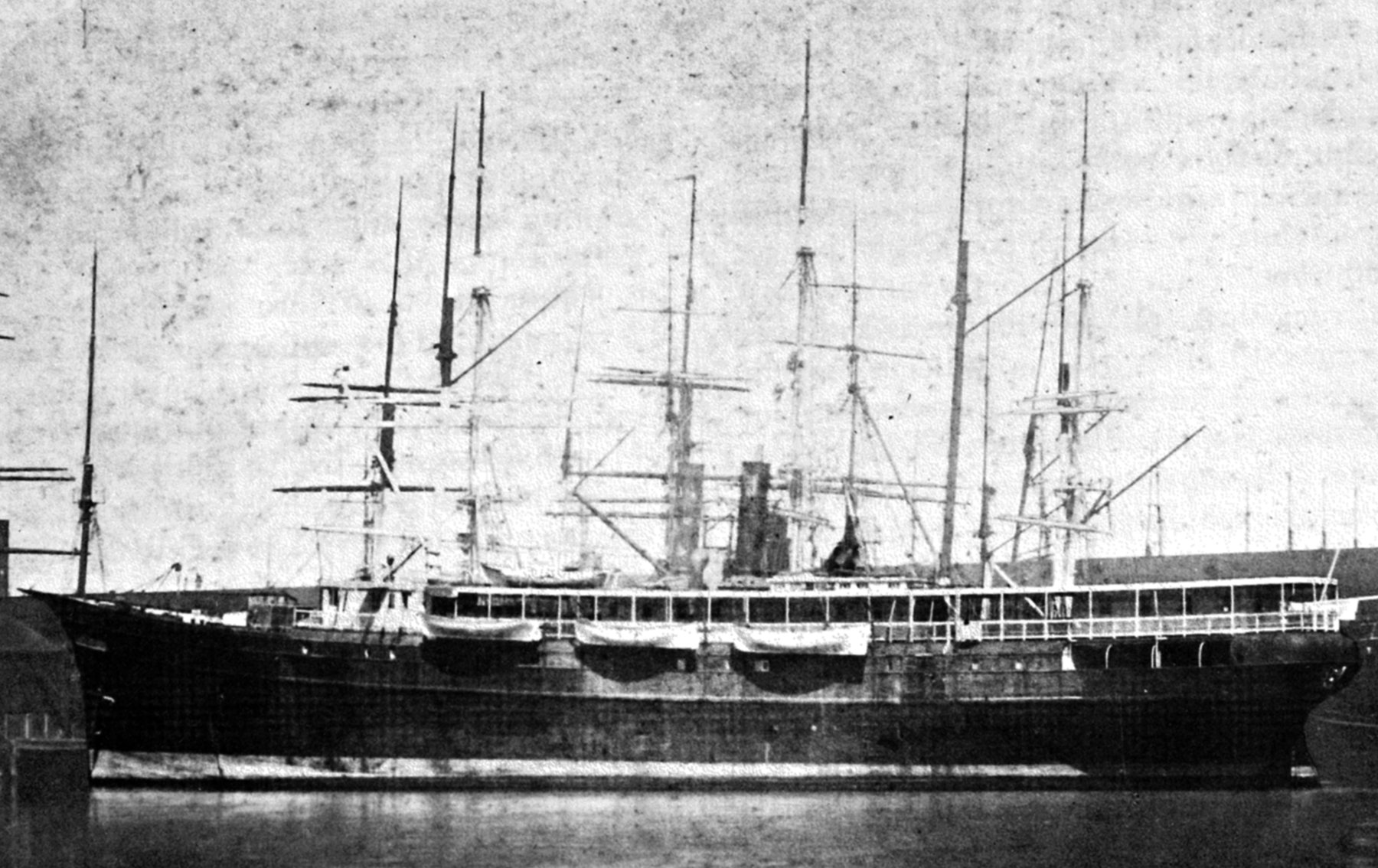
- SS Gussie Telfair at anchor.

History

United Kingdom
- Name: Gertrude
- Owner: Thomas Begbie, London
- Builder: Barclay, Curle and Company, Glasgow
- Launched: 25 November 1862
- In service: January 1863
- Captured: 16 April 1863

History

United States
- Name: USS Gertrude
- Acquired: 4 June 1863
- Commissioned: 22 July 1863
- Decommissioned: 11 August 1865
- Fate: Sold 30 November 1865

History

United States
- Name: Gussie Telfair
- Owner: George Wright/J T Wright Jr, New York; California & Mexico Steamship Company, San Francisco; F Barnard & Company, San Francisco
- Acquired: 30 November 1865
- Fate: Wrecked 25 September 1880

General characteristics
- Displacement: 350 tons
- Length: 156 ft (48 m)
- Beam: 21 ft (6.4 m)
- Depth of hold: 11 ft (3.4 m)
- Installed power: 100nhp
- Propulsion: steam engine; screw-propelled
- Armament: two 12-pounder rifles; six 24-pounder howitzers

USS Gertrude was the British blockade-running steamship Gertrude captured by the Union Navy during the American Civil War. She was placed in service by the Navy as a gunboat and assigned to patrol the southern coast of the United States for ships attempting to run the Union blockade of Southern ports. She was later the American merchant ship Gussie Telfair until wrecked in 1880.

== Service history ==
The iron-hulled steamer Gertrude was built in Whiteinch, Glasgow, Scotland as Yard No.100 at the Clydeholm yard of Barclay, Curle & Company as an American Civil War blockade runner and launched on 25 November 1862. Along with her sistership Emma, she was built for Thomas Stirling Begbie, a London shipowner and merchant. Gertrude was measured as 278grt and 191nrt, with dimensions 164.4 feet length overall, 21.2 feet beam and 12.2 feet depth. She was powered by 2-cylinder oscillating engine of 100nhp, made by John Scott's Greenock Foundry Company, Greenock. Gertrude made her first run of the blockade from Nassau, Bahamas to Charleston, South Carolina, arriving 16 March 1863, and returned safely with 820 bales of cotton. On her next trip, Gertrude had barely left Nassau when she was chased and captured on 16 April 1863 by the gunboat USS Vanderbilt off Eleuthera Island, Bahamas.

Purchased from the New York City Prize Court by the United States Navy on 4 June 1863, Gertrude was fitted out at New York Navy Yard and commissioned there on 22 July 1863, Acting Master Walter K. Cressy in command. Assigned to the West Gulf Blockading Squadron under Rear Admiral David Farragut, Gertrude arrived off Mobile, Alabama, in early August and on 16 August captured the Confederate blockade runner Warrior following a 9-hour chase. After taking her prize to New Orleans, Louisiana, Gertrude was assigned to blockade duty off that port. She served as a blockading ship, alternating between New Orleans and Mobile, until May 1864, and was credited with the capture of schooner Ellen on 16 January 1864. During this period she also spent short periods at Ship Island, Mississippi, and New Orleans for repairs.

Beginning in May 1864, Gertrude was assigned to blockade the Texas coast, and spent most of the next year off Galveston, Texas. She visited blockading stations off Sabine Pass and Velasco, Texas, and took blockade runner Eco off Galveston 19 February 1865. Gertrude also captured over 50 bales of cotton 19 April 1865 which were thrown overboard by famous Confederate blockade runner Denbigh during her escape from the blockading fleet. Gertrude decommissioned 11 August 1865 at the Philadelphia Navy Yard and was sold 30 November at New York City to George Wright. She was redocumented Gussie Telfair in 1866 and sailed as a merchantman until 1878.
