= USS General Burnside =

Gunboat of the United States Navy

History

United States
- Name: General Burnside
- Namesake: Ambrose Burnside
- Launched: 1862
- Acquired: 1863
- Commissioned: 8 August 1864
- Out of service: 1 June 1865
- Stricken: 1865 (est.)
- Fate: Returned to War Department 1 June 1865

General characteristics
- Displacement: 201 tons
- Length: 171 ft (52 m)
- Beam: 26 ft (7.9 m)
- Depth of hold: 4 ft 9 in (1.45 m)
- Propulsion: steam engine; side wheel-propelled
- Armament: 2 × 20-pounder guns; 3 × 24-pounder howitzers

USS General Burnside was a steamship acquired by the Union Navy during the American Civil War. She was used by the Union Navy as a gunboat, and was assigned to patrol waterways in the Confederate South. She was named after Union General Ambrose Burnside.

== Construction and career ==
General Burnside, built in 1862 at Wilmington, Delaware, was sold to the U.S. War Department in 1863 and chartered by the Union Navy. The vessel was commissioned on 8 August 1864 at Bridgeport, Alabama, Acting Volunteer Lt. H. A. Glassford in command.

General Burnside became flagship of the upper Tennessee River Fleet, Mississippi Squadron, 15 October 1864. Based at Bridgeport, she patrolled the river to Whitesburg, Decatur, and Chattanooga, Tennessee. On 27 December 1864 she helped repulse Confederate attacks at Decatur. She was hulled several times while exchanging gunfire with Confederate sharpshooters. This gunboat action in concert with Union Army forces brought about the evacuation of Decatur by the Confederates and left the upper Tennessee region under firm Union control.

The gunboat continued river patrol until 1 June 1865 when she was returned to the War Department at Bridgeport, Alabama.
