= USS Huntress (1862) =

Gunboat of the United States Navy

History

United States
- Launched: 1862
- Acquired: May 1864
- Commissioned: 10 June 1864
- Decommissioned: 10 August 1865
- Fate: Sold, 17 August 1865

General characteristics
- Displacement: 211 tons
- Length: 131 ft 8 in (40.13 m)
- Beam: 31 ft 3 in (9.53 m)
- Depth of hold: 4 ft 2 in (1.27 m)
- Propulsion: steam engine; stern wheel-propelled
- Speed: 5 knots (9.3 km/h; 5.8 mph)
- Armament: two 30-pounder Parrott rifles; four 24-pounder howitzers

USS Huntress was a steamer acquired by the Union Navy during the American Civil War. She was placed into service as a gunboat assigned to support the Union Navy during the naval blockade of ports and rivers of the Confederate States of America.

== Service history ==
Huntress, a stern-wheel steamer, was built in 1862 in New Albany, Indiana. She was purchased by the Navy at Louisville, Kentucky, in May 1864, taken to Cincinnati, Ohio, for outfitting and reported to the 8th District, Mississippi Squadron for duty 10 June 1864, Acting Master J. S. Dennis in command. Assigned to the area of the Mississippi River between Memphis, Tennessee, and Columbus, Kentucky, Huntress engaged in the key role of keeping the vital river lines of supply open, stopping illegal trade in cotton along the riverbank and suppressing bands of guerrillas who attacked transports and gunboats.

After repairs at Mound City, Illinois, November 1864, she returned to active patrolling on the stretch of river between Mound City and Memphis. Huntress remained on that duty between March and July 1865, maintaining Union control of the Mississippi River during the waning moments of the Civil War. In July, she returned to Mound City and, after brief service transporting ordnance at the Naval Base, decommissioned 10 August 1865. She was sold 7 days later to Samuel Black. Redocumented Huntress 2 October, she resumed her career as a river steamer but was lost after stranding near Alexandria, Louisiana, 30 December 1865.
