= USS Honeysuckle =

Gunboat of the United States Navy

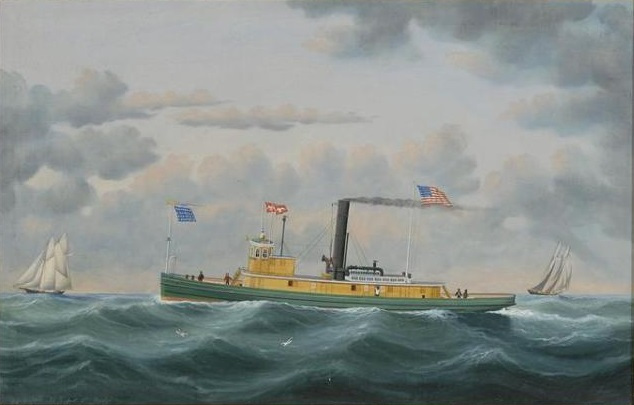
- Honeysuckle - oil-on-canvas painting by William Gaye Yorke

History

United States
- Ordered: as William G. Fargo
- Laid down: date unknown
- Launched: 1862
- Acquired: 19 August 1863
- Commissioned: 3 December 1863
- Decommissioned: 30 June 1865
- Stricken: 1865 (est.)
- Fate: Sold, 1865

General characteristics
- Displacement: 241 tons
- Length: 123 ft (37 m)
- Beam: 20 ft 2 in (6.15 m)
- Draught: 10 ft (3.0 m)
- Propulsion: steam engine; screw-propelled
- Speed: 12 knots
- Complement: not known
- Armament: two 20-pounder guns

USS Honeysuckle was a steamer acquired by the Union Navy during the American Civil War.

She was used by the Navy as a gunboat to patrol navigable waterways of the Confederacy to prevent the South from trading with other countries. At war's end, she was converted to a storeship before eventually being decommissioned.

== Built in New York in 1862 ==
Honeysuckle, a wooden screw steamer, was built as William G. Fargo in 1862 at Buffalo, New York, and was purchased 19 August 1863 at New York from her owner, Frank Perew. Renamed Honeysuckle, she commissioned at New York Navy Yard 3 December 1863, Acting Ensign Cyrus Sears commanding.

== Civil War operations ==
=== Assigned to the blockade of the Florida coast ===
Intended for use as a tug and offshore blockader, Honeysuckle departed New York 24 December 1863 and sailed by way of Hampton Roads, Virginia, and Charleston, South Carolina, to Key West, Florida, arriving about 8 January 1864.

There she was assigned a blockading station in the Gulf of Mexico west of the Florida coast as part of the East Gulf Blockading Squadron. In the next few months the ship was very active, tightening the noose of the blockade. She captured Fly 11 January, Florida 20 March, and Miriam 27 April 1864.

=== Serving various operational roles in the Florida area ===
Early in May Honeysuckle served as a dispatch vessel at Key West and during the next 2 months was hit by an epidemic of yellow fever among the crew. In August she became a supply vessel, making one notable trip to Indian River with medical supplies for J. S. Chambers, a ship stricken with fever. Honeysuckle continued to act as a supply vessel and tug until December 1864, when she was reassigned to active blockade duty after a repair period at Key West. Taking up station off Cedar Keys, she captured three more blockade runners in early 1865: Augusta, 17 January; Sort, 28 February; and Phantom, 2 March.

== Final operations and decommissioning ==
Honeysuckle sailed to Tampa, Florida, at war's end, and thence to New York where she decommissioned 30 June 1865. Sold to a private buyer, she became merchant ship Honeysuckle late in 1865 and remained active until 1900.
