= USS Siren (1862) =

Gunboat of the United States Navy

History

United States
- Launched: 1862
- Acquired: 11 March 1864
- Commissioned: 30 August 1864
- Decommissioned: 12 August 1865
- Fate: Sold, 17 August 1865

General characteristics
- Displacement: 214 tons
- Length: 154 feet 7 inches (47.12 m)
- Beam: 32 feet 3 inches (9.83 m)
- Draft: 5 feet (1.5 m)
- Propulsion: steam engine; stern wheel-propelled
- Speed: 7 mph (upstream)
- Armament: 2 × 24-pounder howitzers

USS Siren was the 214-ton wooden-hulled, stern-wheel steamer White Rose launched in 1862 that the Union Navy purchased in 1864. The Navy outfitted Siren with two 24-pounder howitzers for use in bombardment and assigned her to operations on the Mississippi River where Union forces were attempting to maintain control of the river in order to split the Confederate States of America in two. The Navy sold her in 1865 and new owners returned her name to White Rose. They abandoned her in 1867.

== Service history ==
Siren was built as White Rose in 1862 at Parkersburg, Virginia . The Navy purchased her on 11 March 1864 at Cincinnati, Ohio. The Navy initially used her as a temporary receiving ship at Mound City, Illinois. It then fitted her out as a "tinclad" gunboat and commissioned her on 30 August 1864 for service on the Mississippi River between Columbus, Kentucky, and Memphis, Tennessee. However, before she could proceed downstream to her station, she was ordered, on 23 September, to Cape Girardeau, Missouri, to guard that area against a reportedly imminent attack by Confederate troops under Brigadier General Joseph O. Shelby. When the alarm proved groundless, she steamed downstream to her station as a ship of the Fourth District of the Mississippi Squadron. Into February 1865, she served on the river protecting Union shipping and preventing Confederate traffic across the river.

On 14 February, Siren was ordered to proceed to New Orleans, Louisiana, for temporary duty with the West Gulf Blockading Squadron during mop-up operations in Mobile Bay. However, upon her inspection at New Orleans, it was decided that she would require such "extensive repairs, alterations, and adjustments" before she would be ready for service at sea, that she was promptly returned to the Mississippi Squadron. She served on the rivers through the end of the Civil War. Among her varied duties during the first months after the Confederacy collapsed, was the task of accepting the surrender of Southern troops and of disarming the region. Siren was decommissioned at Mound City on 12 August 1865 and sold at public auction there on 17 August 1865 to G. E. Warner, E. S. Mills, et al. Renamed White Rose on 3 October 1865, she served in river commerce until abandoned in 1867.

== See also ==
- Anaconda Plan
