= USS Mary Sanford =

Gunboat of the United States Navy

History

United States
- Laid down: date unknown
- Launched: 1862
- Acquired: 13 July 1863
- Commissioned: 20 August 1863
- Decommissioned: 21 June 1865
- Stricken: 1865 (est.)
- Fate: Sold, 13 July 1865

General characteristics
- Displacement: 457 tons
- Length: 102 ft (31 m)
- Beam: 31 ft 6 in (9.60 m)
- Draught: 12 ft 6 in (3.81 m)
- Propulsion: steam engine screw-propelled
- Speed: 9 knots
- Complement: not known
- Armament: two 24-pounder guns
- Armour: wood

USS Mary Sanford was a steamer acquired by the Union Navy during the American Civil War.

She was used by the Union Navy for various tasks, including carrying supplies and acting as a hospital ship, a picket ship, and as a tugboat.

== Built in Connecticut in 1862 ==
A wooden screw steamer built at Stonington, Connecticut, in 1862, Mary Sanford was purchased by the Navy 13 July 1863 at Philadelphia, Pennsylvania, from William R. Dinsmore, and commissioned 20 August 1863 at the New York Navy Yard, Acting Master's Mate Alfred P. Hich in command.

== Civil War service ==
=== Assigned to the South Atlantic Blockade ===
Assigned to the South Atlantic Blockading Squadron, Mary Sanford served as a transport during 1863, ferrying sick men to northern ports, towing tug John Adams from Morris Island to Port Royal, South Carolina, 5 September, and carrying out buoys at Hampton Roads the 18th. She arrived Morris Island 1 November with ordnance stores, departing as a gunboat 24 December in the expedition to Murrell's Inlet to destroy a schooner trying to run the blockade and to disperse Confederates that had been harassing Union gunboats there.

=== Freeing Georgia slaves on the White Oak Creek ===
After this successful expedition, Mary Sanford was stationed off Charleston, South Carolina, as part of the blockade 4 January 1864, and served in the blockade there until transferring to Big Satilla River in the early autumn. With Braziliera, she freed slaves on a plantation on White Oak Creek, Georgia, 15 October, engaging and driving off Confederate cavalry at Yellow Bluff.

== Post-war decommissioning, sale and civilian career ==
After the end of the conflict, Sanford decommissioned 21 June 1865 at Philadelphia and was sold there at public auction 13 July. Redocumented 16 August 1865, she continued to serve American commerce until 1871.
