= Muara Satui =

- Port
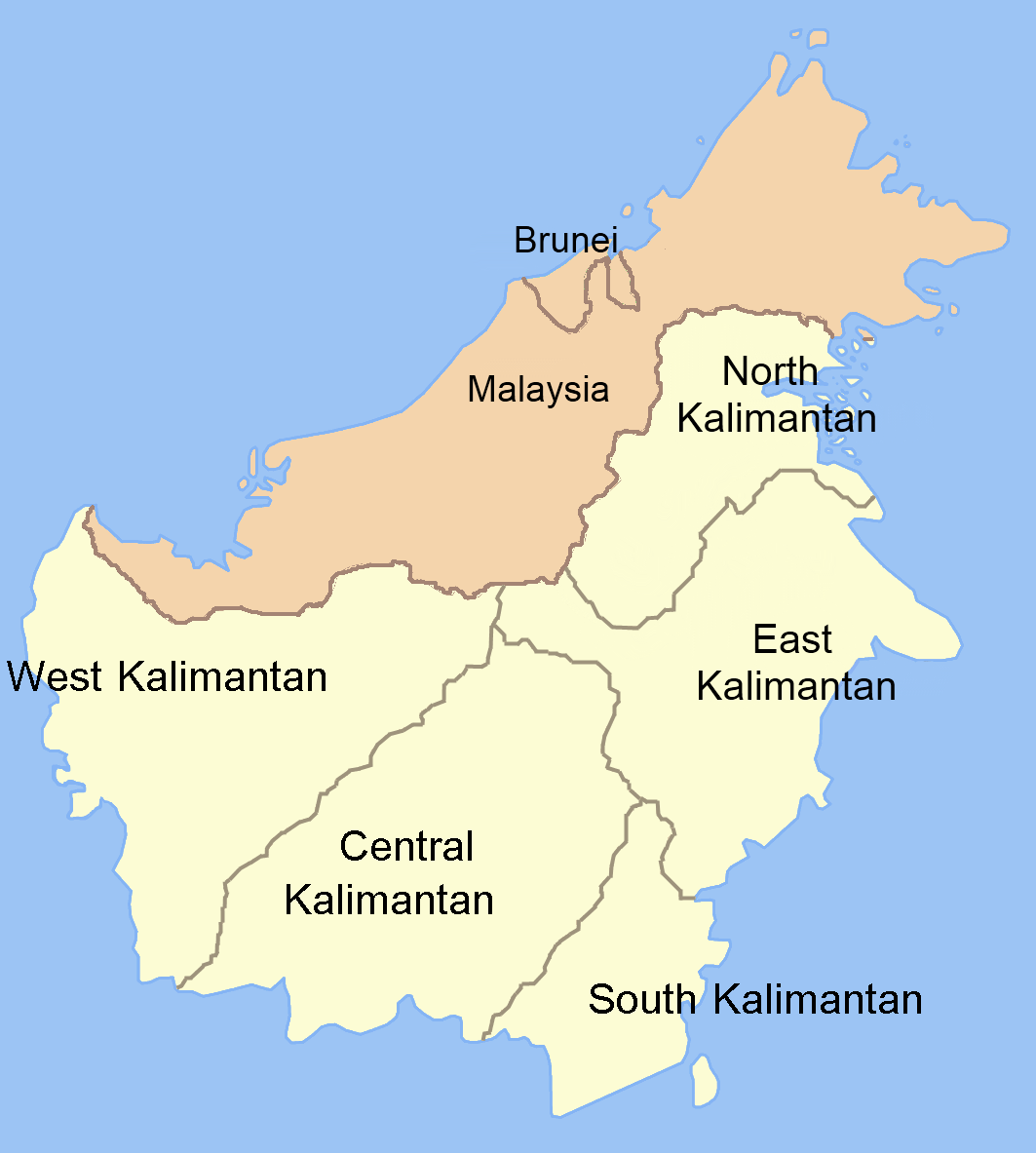

- Location of Muara Satui in Kalimantan Timur Location of Tanjung Bara in Indonesia
- Coordinates: 3°58′0.25″S 115°31′10.32″E
- Country: Indonesia
- Province: East Kalimantan
- Elevation: 0 m (0 ft)

Demographics
- Time zone: UTC+8 (CIT)
  - Summer (DST): UTC+8 (not observed)
- Date format: dd-mm-yyyy
- Drives on the: left

Muara Satui is an anchorage loading port in South Kalimantan, Indonesia. Primarily known for its coal loading anchorage, it lies on the southern coast of East Kalimantan, Borneo.

== Location ==
Muara Satui is located on the island of Kalimantan at 3°58′0.25″S 115°31′10.32″E, about 100 kilometres south east of Banjarmasin. The closest small towns to the port are the towns of Satui and Sebamban, and the closest large town is that of Banjarmasin.

== Port information ==
The port of Muara Satui is similar to Taboneo in that all cargo loading and discharging operations are carried out in the large open anchorage by cranes and barges. Tugs with barges laden with coal come alongside ships in the anchorage and carry out loading operations with ships cranes or shore cranes. It is common to find 3 to 5 barges alongside a single ship. Another anchorage loading port at Muara Sebamban lies 5 miles to the east of Muara Satui.

The port is a popular loading port for coal, nickel ore and iron ore and has a depth of 14 metres. Operations continue around the clock with a loading rate of 8000-10,000 tonnes per day.

The coal loaded at the anchorage is sometimes referred to as "Satui coal" is a variety of bituminous coal (coking coal) and originates in the Satui mines and WBM mines. The mines contain deposits of Karuh, Kintap, Satui and Bukit Baru. Satui coal seams themselves are sub-divided based on their ash content. Though the coal requires crushing, due to its low ash content it does not require washing. Satui coals are crushed at facilities adjacent to the Muara Satui anchorage port and then stacked into stockpiles representing different Satui products. These stockpiles are sometimes blended, thus allowing coal of desired quality specifications to be loaded for ships. The mines are owned by various entities including PT Arutmin and PT Bayan resources.
