= SS Benbrack =

British steamship

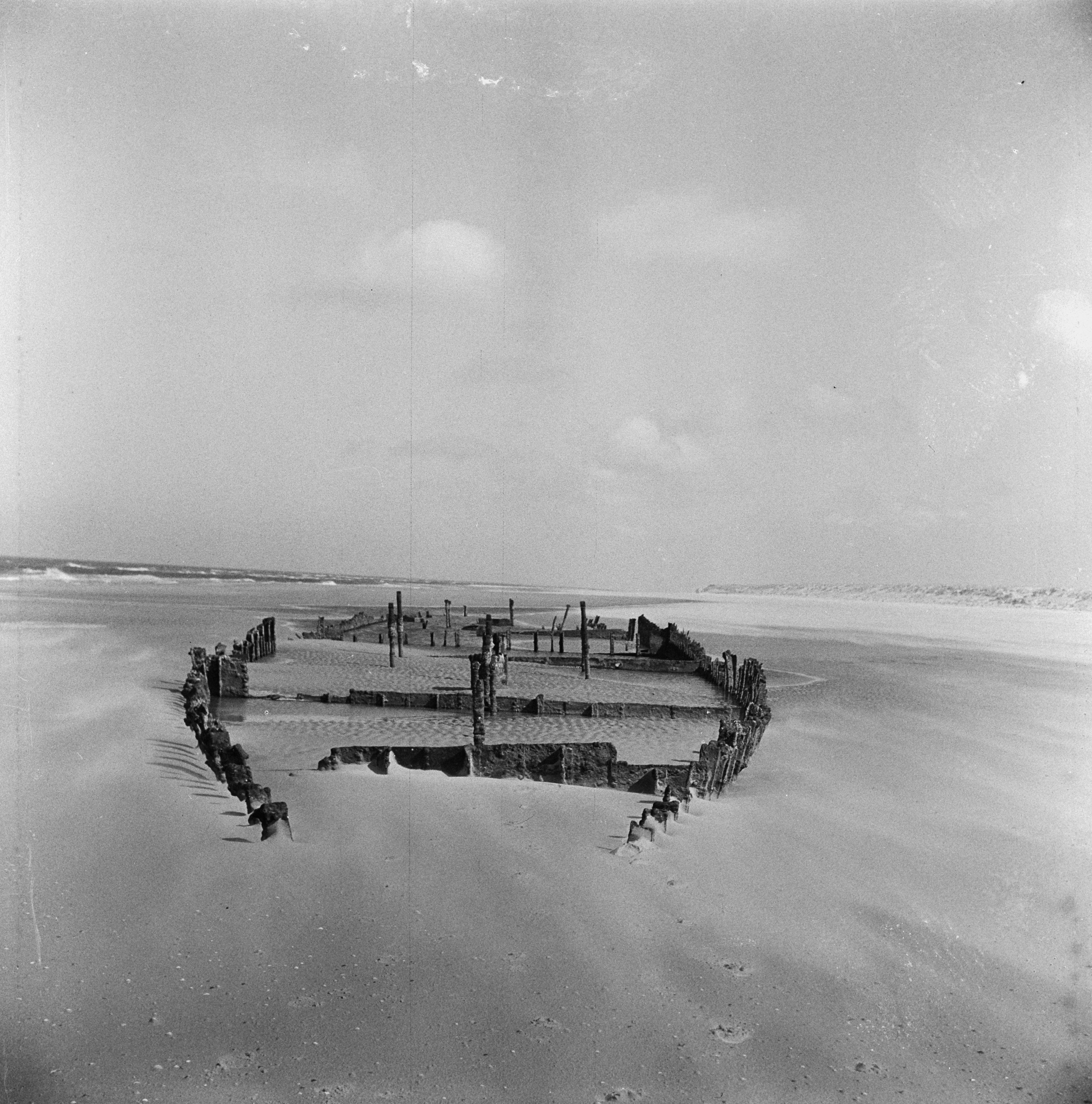
- Remainings of the wreck of Benbrack in 1952, over 60 years later after she wrecked at Texel.

History

United Kingdom
- Name: SS Benbrack
- Out of service: 1889
- Fate: wrecked on Texel the Netherlands on 23 January 1889

General characteristics
- Type: steamship
- Length: 90 metres

SS Benbrack was a 19th-century British merchant steamship, built before 1883.

After driving ashore a few times in December 1888, she wrecked on 23 January 1889 on Texel, the Netherlands. The salvage of the around 5000 bales cotton was difficult and took four months. The salvage of the ship had also its difficulties and took years. The wreck was sold multiple times over these years. After 65 years, in 1954, the wreck was finally completely salvaged.

== History ==
The merchant steamship was built before March 1883. She arrived at among others chronologically:

- Liverpool
- Barbados (March 1883)
- St. Thomas
- Cardiff (February 1884)
- Odessa
- Antwerp (May 1885)
- Quebec (June 1885)
- Newp.News. (?)
- Liverpool (May 1886)
- Montreal
- Norfolk
- Liverpool (November 1886)
- Norfolk
- Liverpool (March 1887)
- Oxelösund
- Vlissingen (August 1888)
- Savannah, Georgia (December 1888)

=== Accidents ===
In December 1888 the ship was driven ashore at Savannah, Georgia, United States. She was refloated and put back to Savannah. On 2 January 1889 she was again driven ashore at Savannah. She was floated on tide and continued voyage.

=== Fate ===
After refloating, while on voyage with linnen to Bremen, she ran aground near Texel, the Netherlands on 23 January 1889. A tugboat was not able to refloat her. A later attempt with four tugboats was also unsuccessful. Part of the cargo, 250 bales of cotton, were at that time recovered. After few days, her condition was said to be hopeless.

=== Salvage and aftermath ===
Given the high position of the ship, it was very difficult to salvage the rest of the cargo, approximately 5,000 bales of cotton. A tender for the transport was made for 2.25 guilder per bale. A steamboat company took the job to salvage the ship. The company had over 20 boats available for the job and over 150 employees, including a few divers. A wooden house was built on the beach of Eierland to provide shelter for the workers and to store the cargo. The ship moved higher and higher on the beach, the rudder broke off and more and more water came on board. As of 6 February 1889, 1000 bales were salvaged. During a storm in February 1889, the ship blew onto its side and sank further into the sand. Three workers had to be rescued with a rescue boat. As of 7 March 1889, still 1000 bales had to be salvaged.

The ship was finally completely salvaged on 27 April 1889.

In the months following March 1889 the cotton was shipped to Bremen.

From mid-March 1889 when the ship was almost completely salvaged, plans were made to break down the ship. But there were strong doubts about the chance of success of breaking down the ship. Ultimately it was not possible to get the ship off the beach. The inventory was auctioned on 6 May 1889. The ship was bought by J. Richardson from England for 5400 Guilder. The inventory had a total revenue of 222,75 Guilder. In Bremen the salvaged cotton was sold for a total of 460,000 Mark.

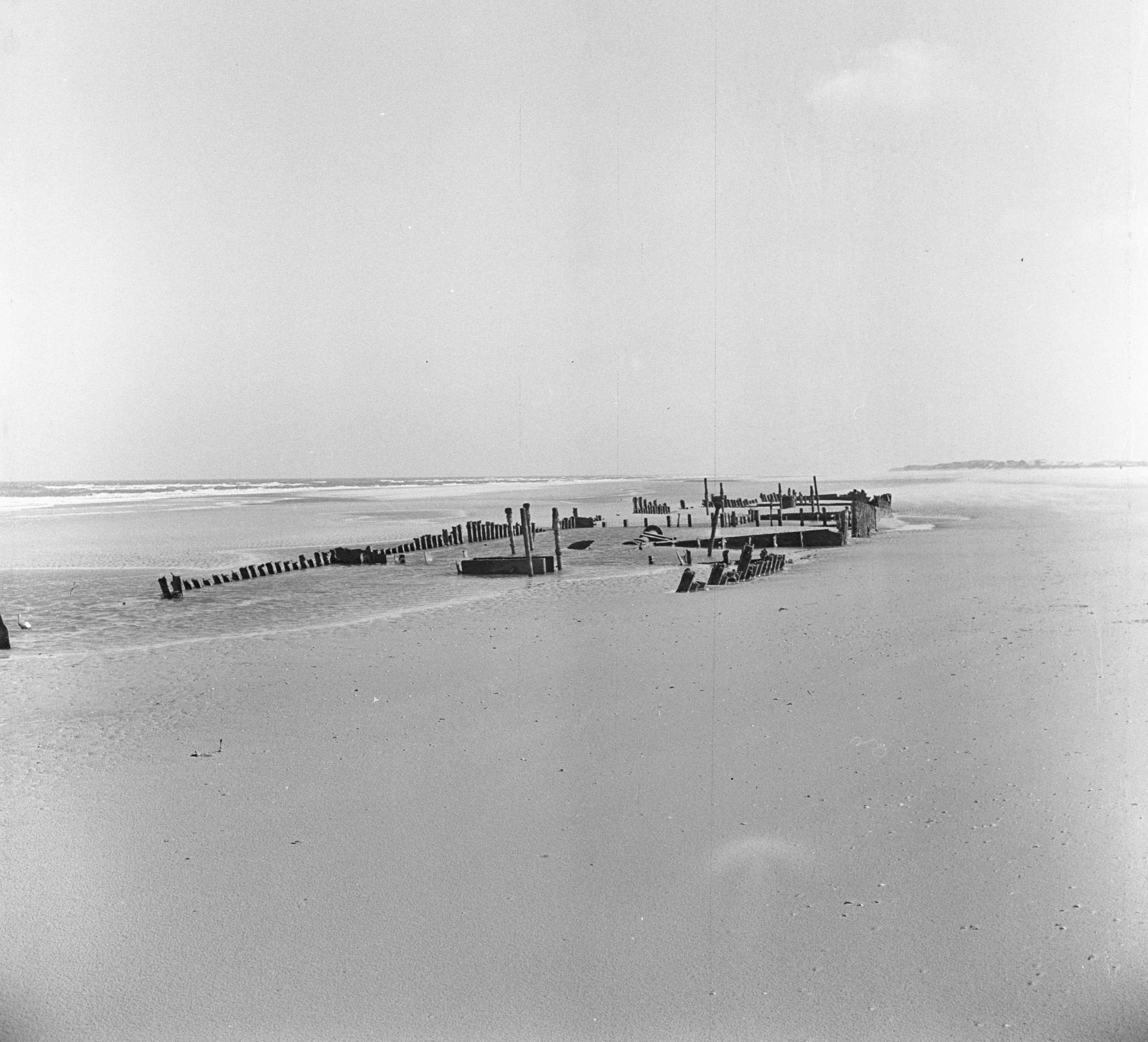
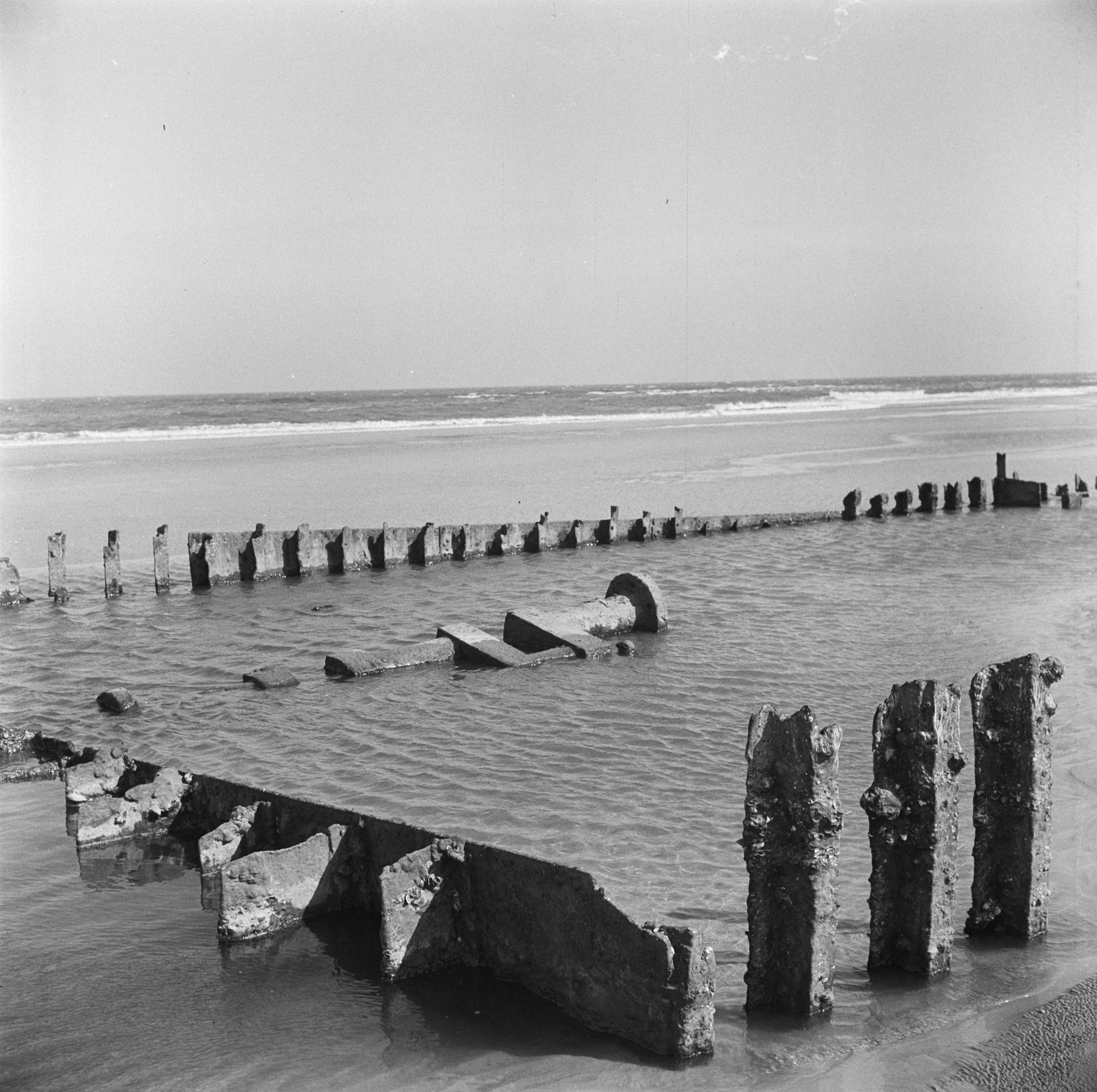
Remainings of the wreck in 1952

On 24 April 1890 British people moved to the Netherlands and started with the break-up of the ship. The work went very slowly. Due to high costs and low returns, the wreck was offered for sale again. However, no buyer was found. The mast was destroyed by dynamite. The workers returned to England. The break-up of the wreck was continued the next month by workers from Den Helder. In October the wreck broke again and sank further into the sand.

In 1891 the wreck was sold to A. Dros from Texel, and started selling over 100.000 kg of iron of the ship. In late 1892 the wreck was almost completely into the sand. The iron was transported to Amsterdam. Until 1894 parts could be excavated, after which the ship disappeared into the sand. Over ten years later some parts became visible again in January 1904.

The wreck also turned out to be an obstacle to shipping.

Almost another 50 years later the wreck became visible again in April 1952. In 1953 company W. Scholte & Co. from Diemen continued to salvage the wreck, including with the help of explosives. The wreck was completely salvaged in 1954, 65 years after the ship wrecked.
