= Battle of Buffington Island =

Part of the American Civil War

- Part of the American Civil War
Date	July 19, 1863
Location	Portland, Ohio, and Buffington Island, West Virginia, United States
Result	Union victory

Belligerents
United States (Union)	(Confederate States of America) CSA (Confederacy)

Commanders and leaders
Edward H. Hobson; Henry M. Judah; August Kautz; LeRoy Fitch	John H. Morgan; Basil W. Duke; Adam R. Johnson

Strength
3,000: Cavalry Brigade, 3rd Division, XXIII Corps (Judah); 5th Indiana Cavalry; 14th Illinois Cavalry; 11th Kentucky Cavalry; 8th Michigan Cavalry; 9th Michigan Cavalry; Battery "L" 1st Regiment Michigan Light Artillery; Henshaw's Battery Illinois Light Artillery; 14th Illinois Cavalry Battery 3rd Brigade, 1st Division, 23rd Army Corps (Kautz); 2nd Ohio Cavalry; 7th Ohio Cavalry US Navy; USS Moose; Allegheny Belle; Imperial	1,930: First Brigade (Duke); 2nd Kentucky Cavalry; 5th Kentucky Cavalry; 6th Kentucky Cavalry; 9th Kentucky Cavalry; 9th Tennessee Cavalry Second Brigade (Johnson); 7th Kentucky Cavalry; 8th Kentucky Cavalry; 10th Kentucky Cavalry; 11th Kentucky Cavalry; 14th Kentucky Cavalry Kentucky Battery (four guns)

Casualties and losses
25 killed 30 wounded	52 killed 100 wounded 750 captured

The Battle of Buffington Island, also known as the St. Georges Creek Skirmish, was an American Civil War engagement in Meigs County, Ohio, and Jackson County, West Virginia, on July 19, 1863, during Morgan's Raid. The largest battle in Ohio during the war, Buffington Island contributed to the capture of the Confederate Brig. Gen. John Hunt Morgan, who was fleeing U.S. Army soldiers across the Ohio River at a ford opposite Buffington Island.

Delayed overnight, Morgan was almost surrounded by U.S. cavalry the next day, and the resulting battle ended in a Confederate rout, with over half of the 1,930-man Confederate force being captured. Morgan and some 700 men escaped, but the raid finally ended on July 26 with Morgan's surrender after the Battle of Salineville. Morgan's Raid was of little military consequence, merely terrorizing the populations of southern and eastern Ohio and neighboring Indiana.

== Background ==
Hoping to divert the attention of the Union Army of the Ohio from Confederate forces in Tennessee, Brig. Gen. John H. Morgan and 2,460 Confederate cavalrymen, along with a battery of horse artillery, rode west from Sparta, Tennessee, on June 11, 1863. Twelve days later, when a second Union army (the Army of the Cumberland) began its Tullahoma Campaign, Morgan decided to move northward. His column marched into Kentucky, fighting a series of minor battles, before commandeering two steamships to ferry them across the Ohio River into Indiana (against orders), where, at the Battle of Corydon, Morgan routed the local militia. With his path now relatively clear, Morgan headed eastward on July 13 past Cincinnati and rode across southern Ohio, stealing horses and supplies along the way.

The U.S. response was not long in coming, as Maj. Gen. Ambrose Burnside, commanding the Department of the Ohio, ordered out all available troops, as well as sending several Union Navy gunboats steaming up the Ohio River to contest any Confederate attempt to reach Kentucky or West Virginia and safety. Brig. Gen. Edward H. Hobson led several columns of U.S. cavalry in pursuit of Morgan's raiders, which had been reduced to 1,930 men. Ohio Governor David Tod called out the local militia, and volunteers formed companies to protect towns and river crossings throughout the region.

On July 18, Morgan, having split his column earlier, led his reunited force towards Middleport, Ohio, a quiet river town near the Eight Mile Island Ford, where Morgan intended to cross into West Virginia. Running a gauntlet of small arms fire, Morgan's men were denied access to the river and to Middleport itself (which had a ferry), and he headed towards the next ford upstream at Buffington Island, some 20 miles to the northeast.

Arriving near Buffington Island and the nearby tiny hamlet of Portland, Ohio, towards evening on July 18, Morgan found that the ford was blocked by several hundred local militia ensconced behind hastily constructed earthworks. As a dense fog and darkness settled in, Morgan camped for the night to allow his tired men and horses to rest. He was concerned that even if he pushed aside the militia, he might lose additional men in the darkness as they tried to navigate the narrow ford. The delay proved to be a fatal mistake.

== Fitch's Fleet ==
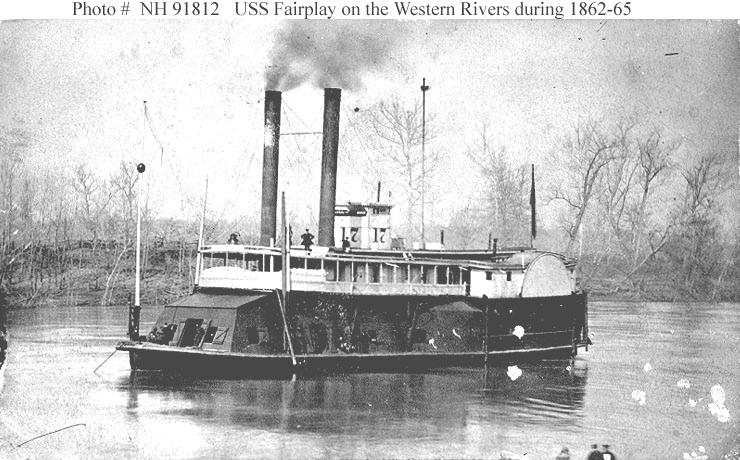
USS Fairplay 1862–1865, Tinclad #17

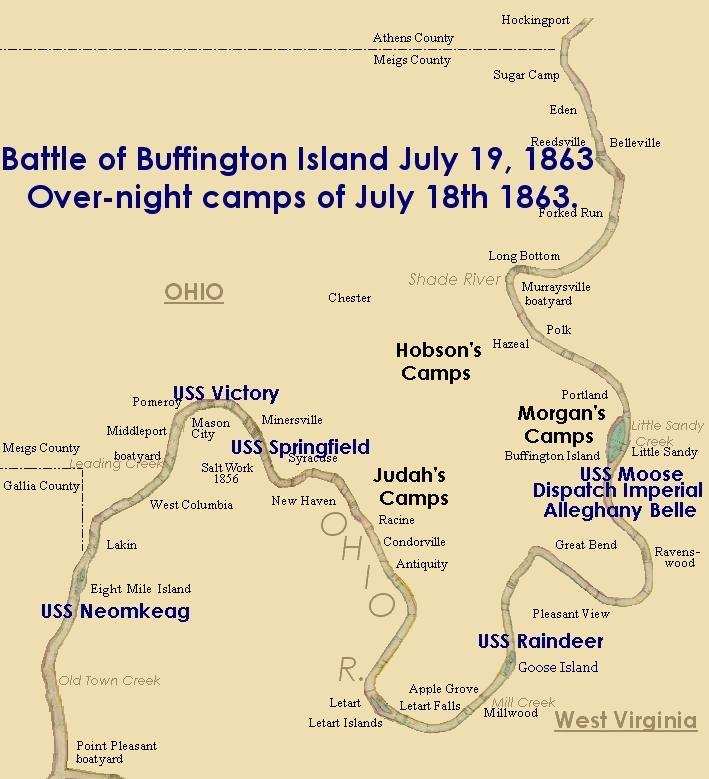
Camps & anchorages the night before the battle.

The US Navy's Mississippi Squadron was involved in the Battle of Buffington Island. Morgan had brought field cannons with his column. A heavy river blockade and a means were realized early in the chase while Morgan's column traveled easterly towards Cincinnati, Ohio. Lt Commander Leroy Fitch's fleet included the Brilliant, Fairplay, Moose, Reindeer, St. Clair, Silver Lake, Springfield, Victory, Naumkeag, and Queen City, which were tinclads and gunboats. A few steamers lagged to zone-up, protecting against a possible doubling back of Morgan's column. The forward vessels were each assigned a patrol zone along the Mason, Jackson, and Wood counties of West Virginia by Fitch's instruction. Naumkeag patrolled from Point Pleasant, West Virginia to Eight Mile Island zone and Springfield guarded from Pomeroy, Ohio towards Letart Islands. Victory's cannon balls have been found along Leading Creek, Ohio, its patrol from Middleport, Ohio to Eight Mile Island along the West Virginia river bank. The Magnolia, Imperial, Alleghany Belle, and Union tinclads and armed packets, which were privateers along with others documented under Parkersburg Logistics' command. The Army's "amphibious division" officer, Major General Ambrose E. Burnside at his Cincinnati headquarters, provided intelligence of Morgan's march and turned his flagship, Alleghany Belle, over to Fitch before the battle. The "amphibious division" tinclads had four to six large jonboats (sideboats) used to fire rifles from, for landing to give chase and pick up prisoners.

Fitch's flagship was the gunboat USS Moose. Moose and Fitch's dispatch privateer, Imperial, were tied up within earshot of the island the night before the battle. It has been written that Fitch had the boilers fired up and shooting its large cannons at the island on first rifle fire, slightly out of range before steam could make way. Allegheny Belle was a little farther down and tied along the Ohio side. Having heard Moose's cannons, it made steam and soon brought up Burnsides' "amphibious infantry" (M. F. Jenkins 1999).

Continuing upstream after the main battle dissolved into skirmishes, Moose fired on a Confederate artillery column attempting to cross the river above the island at the next shoal crossing. Fitch dispatched Imperial to recover Confederate field artillery left behind there. All along the river, spotty gunboat and field cannon fire with clusters of rifle fire was heard shooting at Morgan's scouts, looking for another possible ford. Meanwhile, Parkersburg logistics terminal had sent a local armed packet with 9th Infantry sentries below Blennerhassett Island on word of the battle's gunfire some twenty miles below. These paralleled patrols were opposite the Belpre, Ohio Union Army encampment below the Ohio side of the terminal. This steamboat river harbor and large land debarkations camp blocked Morgan's further attempt to ford the river upstream, turning his retreat north and away from this Ohio River area. The local support vessels were busy hauling ammunition, rations and prisoners. Belpre, Ohio had a supply receiving dockage and depot.

== Battle ==
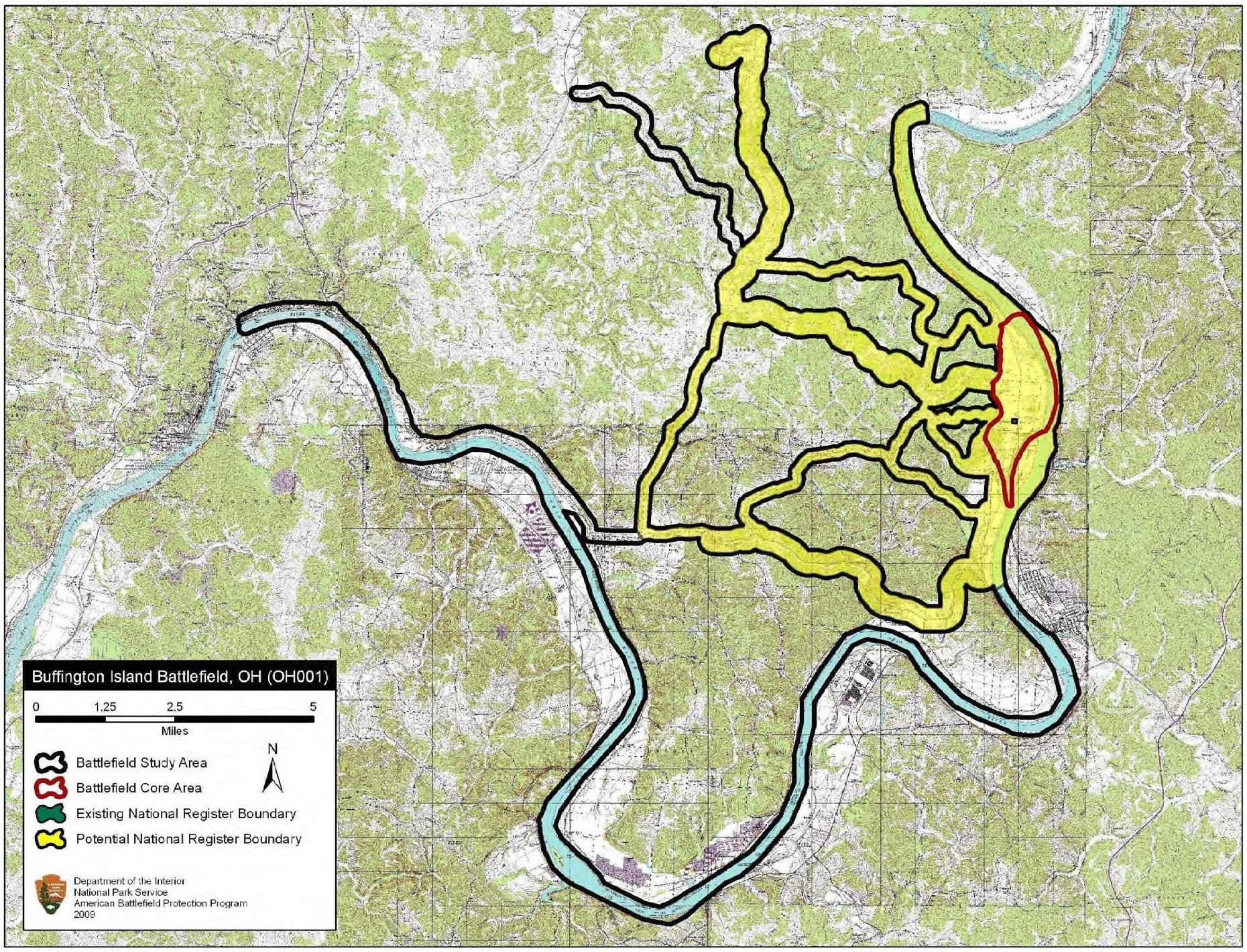
Map of Buffington Island Battlefield core and study areas by the American Battlefield Protection Program.

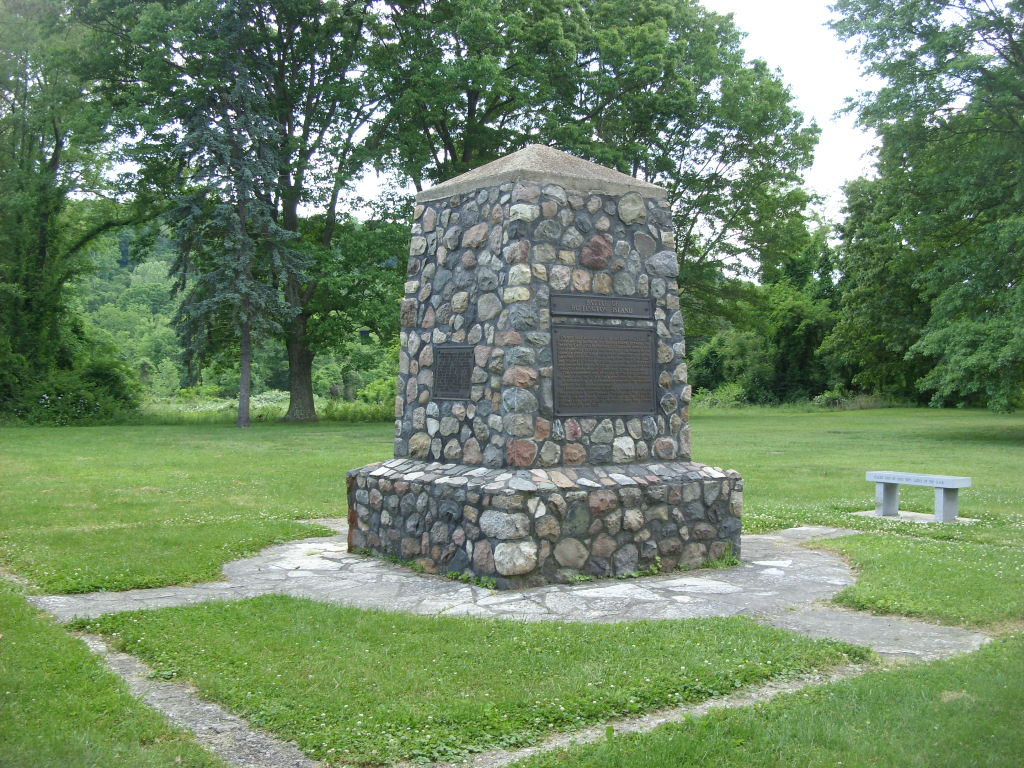
The battlefield monument

On the foggy morning of July 19, a U.S. brigade under Henry M. Judah (1,100 men) finally caught up with Morgan and attacked his position on the broad flood plain just north of Portland, as another column under Edward Hobson (450 men) arrived on the scene. In the spirited early fighting, Maj. Daniel McCook, the 65-year-old patriarch of the famed Fighting McCooks, was mortally wounded. In addition, two Union gunboats, the U.S.S. Moose and the Allegheny Belle, steamed into the narrow channel separating Buffington Island from the flood plain and opened fire on Morgan's men, spraying them with shell fragments. Soon, they were joined by a third gunboat. Also brought onto the field were 970 soldiers under Eliakim Scammon, although this force was not actively engaged. Therefore, only 1,550 Federals were engaged with Morgan's exhausted men.

Morgan, his way to the Buffington Island ford now totally blocked, fled behind a small rear guard and tried to fight northward along the flood plain, hoping to reach yet another ford. It proved to be an exercise in futility, as the converging U.S. columns split apart Morgan's force, and 52 Confederates were killed, with well over one hundred badly wounded in the swirling fighting. Morgan and about 700 men escaped encirclement following a narrow path through the woods. However, his brother-in-law and second-in-command, Col. Basil W. Duke, was captured, as were 71 of Morgan's cavalrymen, including his younger brother John Morgan. Duke formally surrendered to Col. Isaac Garrard of the 7th Ohio Cavalry.

Morgan's beleaguered troops soon headed upstream for the unguarded ford opposite Belleville, West Virginia, where over 300 men fled across the Ohio River, most notably Stovepipe Johnson and famed telegrapher George Ellsworth. Halfway across the ford, Morgan noted with dismay that his remaining men were trapped on the Ohio side as the Union gunboats suddenly loomed into view. He wheeled his horse midchannel and rejoined what was left of his column on the Ohio riverbank. Over the next few days, they failed to find a secure place to cross the river, and Morgan's remaining force was captured on July 26 in northern Ohio following the Battle of Salineville.

Many of those captured at Buffington Island were taken via steamboat to Cincinnati as prisoners of war, including most of the wounded. Morgan and most of his officers were confined to the Ohio Penitentiary in Columbus. Morgan, Thomas Hines, and a few others would later escape and flee to Kentucky.

== Battlefield preservation ==
- Buffington Island
- U.S. National Register of Historic Places
- Location within Ohio Location within the United States
- Nearest city: Pomeroy, Ohio
- Coordinates: 39°0′9″N 81°46′30″W
- Area: 4 acres (1.6 ha)
- Built: 1863
- NRHP reference No.: 70000508
- Added to NRHP: November 10, 1970

Comparatively little changed on the Buffington Island battlefield in the first century after the fighting; the only substantial difference was the placement of a stone obelisk marking the battle. In 1929, the Ohio Historical Society took ownership of the property. In 1970, the National Register of Historic Places listed the battlefield. Embracing approximately 4 acres (1.6 ha) near the river, the designated portion of the battlefield was the county's first location to be recognized as this type of historic site. There are threats to the site as gravel mining operations have been allowed. The current organization working to preserve the battlefield is the Buffington Island Battlefield Preservation Foundation. In September 2022, the American Battlefield Trust and its partners acquired and preserved 108 acres of the battlefield.

== Bibliography ==
- Bennett, B. Kevin and Roth, David, "Battle of Buffington Island," Blue & Gray magazine, April 1998.
- Cahill, Lora Schmidt and Mowery, David L., Morgan's Raid Across Ohio: The Civil War Guidebook of the John Hunt Morgan Heritage Trail. Columbus, Ohio: The Ohio Historical Society, 2014. ISBN 978-0989805438.
- Duke, Basil Wilson, A History of Morgan's Cavalry. Cincinnati, Ohio: Miami Printing and Pub. Co., 1867. On-line version
- Horwitz, Lester V., The Longest Raid of the Civil War. Cincinnati, Ohio: Farmcourt Publishing, Inc., 1999. ISBN 0-9670267-3-3.
- Mowery, David L., Morgan's Great Raid: The Remarkable Expedition from Kentucky to Ohio. Charleston, South Carolina: The History Press, 2013. ISBN 978-1609494360.
