= USS Springfield (1862) =

Gunboat of the United States Navy

History

United States
- Laid down: date unknown
- Launched: 1862
- Acquired: 20 November 1862
- Commissioned: 12 January 1863
- Decommissioned: 30 June 1865
- Stricken: 1865 (est.)
- Fate: Sold, 17 August 1865

General characteristics
- Displacement: 146 tons
- Length: 134 ft 9 in (41.07 m)
- Beam: 26 ft 11 in (8.20 m)
- Draft: 4 ft (1.2 m)
- Depth of hold: 4 ft 4 in (1.32 m)
- Propulsion: steam engine; stern wheel-propelled
- Speed: not known
- Complement: not known
- Armament: six 24-pounder howitzers
- Armor: tin clad

USS Springfield was a steamship purchased by the Union Navy during the American Civil War. She was used by the Union Navy as a gunboat assigned to patrol Confederate waterways.

Springfield—a stern wheel river steamer built at Cincinnati, Ohio, in 1862—was purchased by the Navy at that city on 20 November 1862; and was commissioned at Cairo, Illinois, on 12 January 1863, Lt. Henry A. Glassford in command.

== Patrolling the Ohio, Tennessee and Cumberland Rivers ==
The light draft gunboat operated on the Ohio, Tennessee, and Cumberland Rivers escorting transports and protecting Union Army lines of communication and supply, from time to time engaging guerrilla forces on the river banks.

== Destroying the town of Palmyra, Tennessee ==
On 3 April 1863, Springfield accompanied gunboats USS Lexington, USS Brilliant, USS Alfred Robb and USS Silver Lake on an expedition up the Tennessee River to destroy Palmyra in retaliation for the attack by a Confederate battery there the day before which damaged Union gunboat USS St. Clair and Army transports Eclipse and Luminary.

== In pursuit of Confederate General John Morgan and his raiders ==
Perhaps Springfield's most exciting service came in July when she joined a number of other gunboats in chasing a large Confederate force led by General John Hunt Morgan. The Southern raider crossed the Ohio River on 8 July, entered Indiana, and commenced a wild ride east. While Union home guards pursued him, the Union gunboats moved up the river and prevented him from recrossing to safety in the South. Finally, after a 10-day chase over some 500 miles, the pursuers caught up with the raiders and forced them to attempt to cross at Buffington Island. Federal steamers Moose and Alleghany Belle repeatedly frustrated Morgan's efforts to move his troops south of the river. Pressed from both directions, most of the raiders surrendered.

Morgan and a few followers managed to retreat into the hills and rode on for another week through the North before they were surrounded and captured near New Lisbon, Ohio.

== Chasing Confederates attempting to cross the Cumberland ==
Almost a year of routine convoy and patrol service went by before Springfield could report any more excitement. On 3 June 1864, as the tinclad was descending the Cumberland, she came upon a band of guerrillas attempting to ford the river at Shelly Island. The gunboat opened fire on the Confederates who fled on foot leaving behind four horses, a few pounds of horseshoe nails, and a "contraband" blacksmith whom they had impressed "to shoe rebel horses."

Springfield served on upper rivers through the end of the Civil War.

== Post-war decommissioning, sale, and civilian career ==
On 29 April 1865, she was ordered down to Mound City, Illinois, where she was decommissioned on 30 June. The steamer was sold at public auction there on 17 August 1865 to R. G. Jameson. Re-documented as Jennie D. on 1 April 1866, the stern wheeler served on the Mississippi River system until 1875.

== See also ==
- Anaconda Plan
- Mississippi Squadron
