= USS Victory =

Gunboat of the United States Navy

History

United States
- Ordered: as Banker
- Launched: 1863
- Acquired: May 1863
- Commissioned: 8 July 1863
- Decommissioned: 30 June 1865
- Fate: Sold, 17 August 1865

General characteristics
- Displacement: 160 tons
- Length: 157 ft (48 m)
- Beam: 30 ft 3 in (9.22 m)
- Draft: 5 ft (1.5 m)
- Propulsion: steam engine; sternwheel-propelled
- Speed: 5 knots (9.3 km/h; 5.8 mph)
- Armament: one 24-pounder howitzer

USS Victory was a steamer purchased by the Union Navy during the American Civil War.

Victory was used primarily by the Union Navy as a gunboat assigned to patrol Confederate waterways. She also performed duties as a reconnaissance boat, a convoy escort, and as a dispatch boat.

== Service history ==
Victory—a wooden merchant steamer built at Cincinnati, Ohio, in 1863 and originally named Banker—was acquired by the Navy at Cincinnati in May 1863; was commissioned at Cincinnati on 8 July; but was not formally purchased by the navy until 15 July. Victory was one of the lightly armor-plated gunboats of the Mississippi Squadron called "tinclads" which were used during the Civil War for shallow water patrol and reconnaissance duty on the Tennessee, Ohio, and Cumberland rivers. On the day of Victory's commissioning, 8 July, Confederate General John Hunt Morgan crossed the Ohio River into Indiana at the head of a 2,460-man raiding party. From the 10th to the 19th, Victory, Moose, Reindeer, Springfield, Naumkeag, and Allegheny Belle chased Morgan as he proceeded eastward along the river. Union cavalry ashore prevented him from recrossing the Ohio River to safety in the South.

While Victory and three of the gunboats remained scattered downstream on the 19th to prevent the raiding party from doubling back, the Federals finally trapped Morgan at Buffington Island and forced him to attempt a crossing. The try failed miserably, and most of the Confederates surrendered. Morgan, himself, escaped with a few followers only to be caught near New Lisbon, Ohio, one week later. Victory remained with the Mississippi Squadron for the duration of the war, performing patrol, reconnaissance, convoy, and dispatch duty. On 14 April 1864, she helped to repulse a raid upon Paducah, Kentucky; and—on 4 November, as part of a squadron of six gunboats—aided the successful defense from a carefully staged attack on Johnsonville, Tennessee, led by the famed Confederate cavalryman, Lt. Gen. Nathan B. Forrest. After the Confederacy collapsed, Victory was decommissioned at Mound City, Illinois, on 30 June 1865 and sold at public auction there to W. Thorwegen on 17 August. She was documented as Lizzie Tate on 7 October 1865 and was reduced to a barge on 22 November 1867. At this time, her service afterwards is unknown.

== See also ==
- Anaconda Plan
