= 9th Michigan Cavalry Regiment =

- Active: January 8, 1863, to July 21, 1865
- Country: United States
- Allegiance: Union
- Branch: Cavalry
- Engagements: Battle of Buffington Island; March to the Sea; Battle of Bentonville

The 9th Michigan Cavalry Regiment was a cavalry regiment that served in the Union Army during the American Civil War.

== History ==
The Ninth Cavalry began its organization in the fall of 1862, at Coldwater, under the direction of Colonel James L. David, of Trenton, who had been Quartermaster of the 1st. Michigan Cavalry.

The regiment, with the exception of 2 companies incomplete, was mustered into the service of the United States on the 19th. of May, 1863, the muster rolls containing the names of 1073 officers and men.

Previous to leaving the State for the front, the ladies of Coldwater gave to the Ninth Michigan Cavalry Regiment, a finely lettered silk standard, with the United States arms on one side, on the other, the arms of the State, with the inscription: "Presented by the ladies of Coldwater". This flag passed through many battlefields, being guarded and defended.

The regiment was ordered to the field in Kentucky, under the command of Colonel David, leaving its rendezvous at Coldwater by detachments, respectively, on May 18., 20th., and 25th., 1863, proceeding to Covington, KY, then on June 4., to Hickman's Bridge, where on June 12., they were ordered to Mount Sterling, to pursue Everett's guerrillas, who they overtook at Triplett's Bridge, then completely routed.

Returning to Hickman's Bridge on the 25th., they entered on the campaign against the confederate Morgan. Arriving at Stanford on the 28th., then to Lebanon, arriving there on the 4th. of July, with the rear guard, where they drove Morgan's forces from the town, who was then on his contemplated raid into Indiana and Ohio. Colonel David had hurried his command to this point at the rate of fifty miles per day, then after scattering Morgan's forces, returned to Danville.

The regiment reached Danville on the 6th., where, Colonel W.T. Saunders, of the 5th. Kentucky Cavalry, assumed command of the whole force then there, the Eighth and Ninth Michigan Cavalry, being in the same Brigade. The Ninth left there on the 7th., arriving at Lawrenceburg the same day, here companies "D", "H", and "B", under the command of Major Gallagher, went in pursuit of Morgan's men, engaging them at Cumming's Ford, scattering them and taking 32 prisoners, then returning to Lawrenceburg on the 9th. On the 12th., the Ninth regrouped and marched to Westport, where they were divided.

Companies "A", "B", "F" and "L", under the command of Lt.Colonel George S. Acker, with a section of Battery "L", 1st. Michigan Light Artillery, under the command of Lieutenant Roys, took transports to Cincinnati, arriving there on the 15th. They were disembarked, then immediately ordered by General Burnside, on a march, the intent being, to flank Morgan's forces, then on the Ohio side of the river. Colonel Acker's command joined the forces of General Hobson, at Montgomery, where the pursuit of Morgan commenced, marching day and night, coming upon the southern column at daylight on the 19th., at Buffington's Island. General Hobson's force attacked his rear, while General Judah attacked his front. The engagement was brisk, but short, and the rout of the rebels was complete, over 2000 prisoners being taken by the union forces, with some artillery and a large amount of small arms and equipment, with numerous horses and other property.

The Ninth was hotly engaged, Companies "L" and "F", under Major Gallagher, were dismounted and advanced as skirmishers, driving the rebels, turning their retreat into a complete rout. Major Gallagher, with Company "F:, under the command of Lieutenant Karrer, charged on the rebel flank, capturing three pieces of artillery, with a large number of prisoners, following the retreating confederates for about four miles, until relieved by other union forces. Another detachment of the Ninth, under the command of Colonel David, made up of Companies "C" and "K", along with portions of Companies "A" and "B", with a section of Battery "L", First Michigan Light Artillery, were ordered in pursuit of Morgan, having embarked on transports at Lawrenceburg on July 14., landed at Portsmouth, Ohio, on the 16th., thence pursuing the rebels in the direction of Chester, overtaking them and capturing some prisoners. Continuing the pursuit, the detachment reached Buffington's Island, then on Sunday morning of the 19th., engaged them at that point, taking a large number of prisoners. After the fight, Colonel David's forces were united with that of Lieutenant Acker, then the regiment commenced a movement back to Covington, arriving there on July 31. Another detachment, under the command of Major May, consisting of Companies "D", "E", "H", and "I", with a section of Battery "L", First Michigan Light Artillery, under Lieutenant Gallagher, had left Westport, KY, July the 15th., on board transports, arriving at Cincinnati on the 16th., going into camp at Covington, and remaining there until the 24th. Here Companies "C" and "K", from Portsmouth, joined Way's command. This force on the above date also entered on the pursuit of Morgan, by way of the Little Miami Railroad, arriving at Mingo Junction on the 25th., then marched to La Grange, then to Steubenville. Morgan. being tracked, was soon overtaken, when skirmishing commenced, continuing until after dark, with some loss in wounded, driving the rebels before them during the entire night, exchanging shots.

On the morning of the 26th., Morgan being hard pressed and flanked, was forced into an engagement which resulted, after a severe fight of an hour and a half, in the complete rout of his forces, with a loss of 23 killed, 44 wounded and 305 prisoners, while the detachment of the Ninth, lost in wounded, Lieutenant Fisk and seven men. The pursuit was continued, Morgan with the remnants of his force flying in confusion until, meeting with the forces under General Shackleford, he surrendered.

The regiment, having been reunited at Covington, proceeded to Hickman's Bridge, then participated in the expedition of General Burnside into Eastern Tennessee, arriving at Knoxville on the 3rd. of September, having skirmished at Loudon on the 2nd. From Knoxville they proceeded to the Cumberland Gap. On the 7th., a detachment of the regiment drove in the rebel pickets, entered the Gap, then burned a large mill, on which the confederacy depended to a great extent for subsistence. Loss to the regiment was one killed and one wounded. On the 8th., the rebels, 2500 strong, with 14 cannon, surrendered to the Union forces.

Subsequently, the regiment was engaged at Carter's Station, September 22, loss one killed, four wounded, Zollicoffer, September 24, driving the rebels from their fortifications, Blue Springs on October 5. and 10th., with a loss of two wounded, then at Raytown on October 11., with a loss of two killed and two wounded.

Since they arrived at Covington, in May 1862, the regiment marched nearly 3000 miles, exclusive of marches by detachments, while scouting, foraging, etc.

At the beginning of November, 1863, the regiment was at Henderson Station, and seems to have performed a considerable amount of scouting during the month, in that portion of Tennessee. In December, notes its march towards Knoxville on the 6th., then a skirmish with the confederates on Clinch Mountain on the 7th, during a march 30 miles. On the 10th., while on reconnaissance, the met the rebels two miles from Moorestown, and successfully engaged them, then on the 12th., was occupied, with its Brigade, in a sharp action near Russellville. The position of the regiment at Bean's Station, was attacked on the 14th, causing the command to fall back toward Rutledge.

The next two days, the regiment, under the command of Major Brockway, (Colonel Acker being wounded at Bean's Station), while acting as rear guard, was engaged in constant skirmishing near Rutledge. Later in the month they were in skirmishes at Dandridge and Mossy Creek.

On the 16th, of January, 1864, the regiment, then under the command of Major Gallagher, moved from Dandridge in the direction of Bull's Gap, encountering the rebels infantry in a large force at Kinsboro Cross Roads, where after a severe fight of about an hour and a half, the regiment fell back to Dandridge, having lost 32 in killed, wounded and missing. The next day they were skirmishing from noon to dark near the same place, then fell back to New Market, having been engaged at Fair Garden, Sevierville, and Strawberry Plains. Then they moved from Strawberry Plains to Knoxville. Further memoranda refer to continued marches and counter marches during the month, which closed with the regiment at Little River. The May reports indicate they were camped near Nicholasville, waiting for new equipment.

In June the regiment is found again fighting, with the notorious Morgan near, near Cynthiana, Kentucky. It appears that on June the 9th, the regiment, then under the command of Colonel Acker, was in camp at Nicholasville, and ordered to scout Bayley's Cross Roads, a distance of 14 miles, with orders that if Morgan was found, to engage him. On the 10th., they marched to Lexington, where a battalion of the regiment, under the command of Major McBride, met with a portion of Morgan's command, had a brisk skirmish, then retired. On the 11th the regiment marched to Paris and bivouacked for 2 hours, then after dark started for Cynthiana, leading the horses most of the way, so as to make as little noise as possible. Just at daylight on the 12th, the confederates were found behind rail barricades. The 11th Michigan and the 12th Ohio Cavalry were in line of battle on foot, for the purpose of driving them from the barricade, while the 9th. charged the left flank in a most splendid manner, taking 300 prisoners, 500 horses and a large quantity of small arms. This charge was a brilliant affair, completely routing the southerners, and driving large numbers of their troops into the Licking River in much confusion and thoroughly demoralized.

On October 9, the regiment was at Decatur, then on to Stone Mountain, from there they set out on the Atlanta Campaign with General Sherman's Army, skirmishing at Macon, then Griswaldville, again at Milledgeville on the 24th. of November, thence to Gilliam's Plantation.

For the duration of the war the 9th participated in all of the movements of Sherman's Army on his infamous March to the Sea, then with his northward thrust into the Carolinas that resulted finally in the surrender of Johnston's Army.

The 9th. after months of scouting, foraging and performing picket duty, all along the Eastern seaboard, marched to Concord on the 14th. of July, where they were mustered out of service on the 21st, then sent by rail to Jackson, Michigan, where they were paid off and disbanded on the 30th.

The Ninth was the only Michigan Cavalry Regiment that marched with Sherman to the sea, and composed the escort of General Kilpatrick, who maintained communication between that army and the Atlantic coast.

== Total strength and casualties ==
The regiment suffered 2 officers and 26 enlisted men killed in action or mortally wounded and 2 officers and 154 enlisted men who died of disease, for a total of 184 fatalities.

Sergeant James W. Tobin of Northfield, Washtenaw County, Michigan, a member of Company C of the Ninth Michigan Cavalry, was awarded the Medal of Honor having shown exceptional courage in three separate actions, including the rescue of his senior officer.

== Commanders ==
- Colonel George Naylor Lockwood
- Colonel George Sigourney Acker

== See also ==
- List of Michigan Civil War Units
- Michigan in the American Civil War
