= George Sigourney Acker =

- Born: December 25, 1835; Rochester, New York, U.S.
- Died: September 6, 1879 (aged 43); Kalamazoo, Michigan, U.S.
- Burial place: Riverside Cemetery; Union City, Michigan
- Military career
- Allegiance: United States
- Branch: United States Army; Union Army
- Service years: 1861–1865
- Rank: Colonel; Bvt. Brigadier General
- Unit: 1st Michigan Cavalry
- Commands: 9th Michigan Cavalry
- Conflicts: American Civil War; Second Battle of Bull Run; Battle of Buffington Island; Battle of Bean's Station; Savannah campaign; Carolinas campaign

George Sigourney Acker (December 25, 1835 – September 6, 1879) was a Union Army officer in the American Civil War.

Early in the conflict, Acker enlisted in the 1st Michigan Cavalry and was commissioned as captain of Company I. He participated in the battles in the Shenandoah Valley in spring 1862 and the Second Battle of Bull Run. In late 1862 he attained the rank of lieutenant colonel. In early 1863 he was assigned to the 9th Michigan Cavalry. He then participated in the operation against the raids of Confederate General John Hunt Morgan in Kentucky and Ohio. He participated in the Battle of Buffington Island in Ohio. After the capture of Morgan, Acker was posted with his regiment in the forces of General Ambrose Burnside in eastern Tennessee.

Acker was injured November 14, 1863 at Bean's Station. Recovered from his injuries, he returned to the ranks as a colonel in the spring of 1864. He participated again in an operation against the troops of General Morgan and fight in Kentucky and Tennessee until October 1864. After this campaign, he was assigned to General William Tecumseh Sherman and participated in the march to the sea and the countryside of the Carolinas. He received a brevet promotion to brigadier general on March 13, 1865.

Colonel Acker died on September 6, 1879, in Kalamazoo, Michigan and is buried in Union City, in the state of Michigan.
