= USS Silver Lake =

Gunboat of the United States Navy

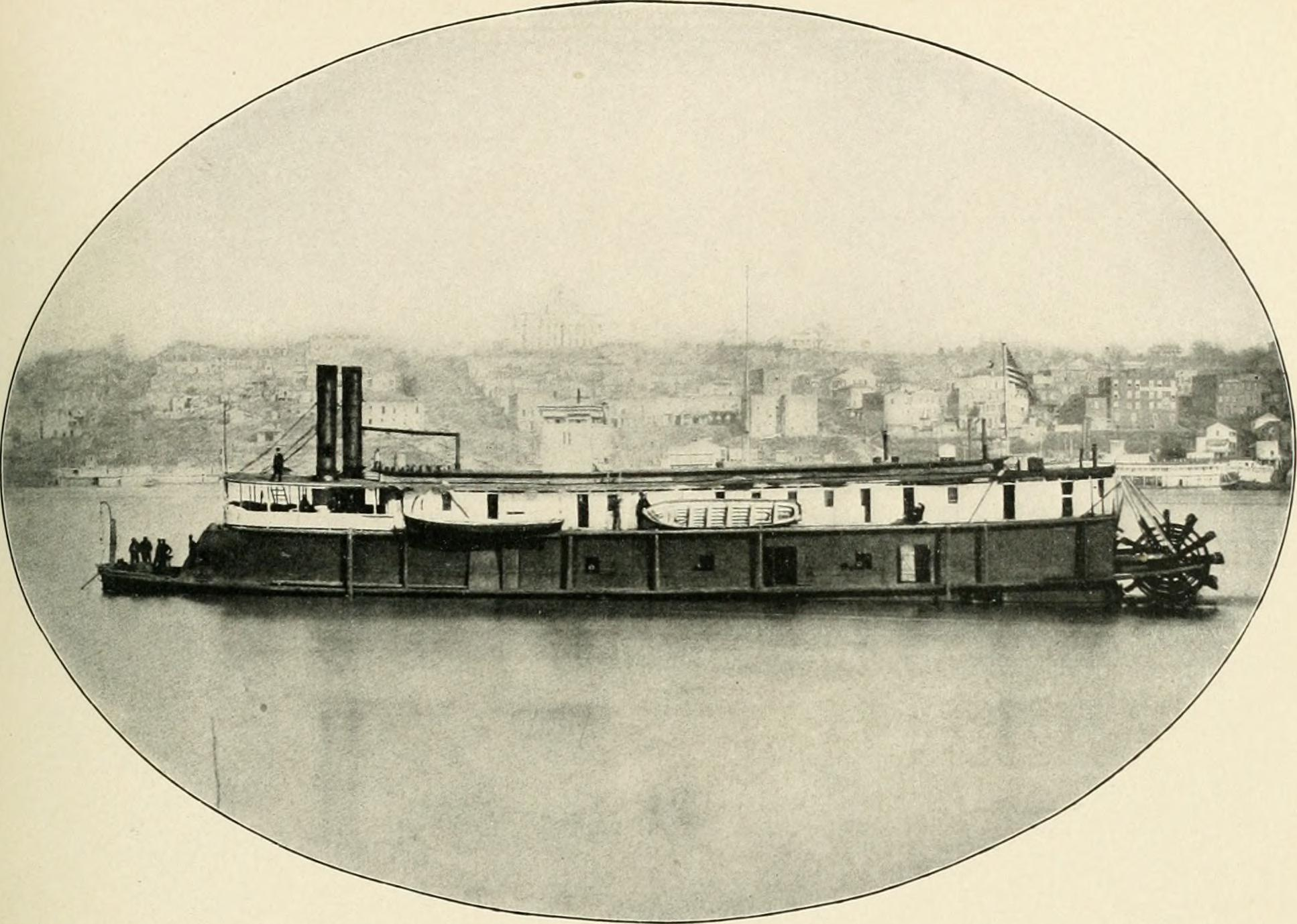
- Silver Lake is lying off Vicksburg after its fall

History

United States
- Laid down: date unknown
- Launched: 1862
- Acquired: 15 November 1862
- Commissioned: 24 December 1862
- Decommissioned: 11 August 1865
- Stricken: 1865 (est.)
- Fate: Sold, 17 August 1865

General characteristics
- Displacement: 236 tons
- Length: 155 ft 1 in (47.27 m)
- Beam: 32 ft 2 in (9.80 m)
- Draught: 6 ft (1.8 m)
- Propulsion: steam engine; stern wheel-propelled
- Speed: 6 knots
- Complement: not known
- Armament: six 24-pounder guns

USS Silver Lake was a steamer purchased by the Union Navy during the American Civil War.

She was used by the Union Navy as a gunboat assigned to patrol Confederate waterways.

== Built in Pennsylvania in 1862 ==
Silver Lake, a wooden stern-wheel steamer built in 1862 at California, Pennsylvania, was purchased by the Navy on 15 November 1862 at Cincinnati, Ohio, for service in the Mississippi Squadron and commissioned on 24 December 1862, Acting Volunteer Lieutenant Robert K. Riley in command.

== Civil war operations ==
=== Ordered to support Union troops at Fort Donelson ===
On 24 January 1863, Silver Lake and USS Lexington were ordered to join three other ships in the Cumberland River to stop Confederate forces from crossing. The expedition, under the command of Lt. Cpmdr. LeRoy Fitch and consisting of Silver Lake, Lexington, USS Fairplay, USS St. Clair, USS Brilliant, and USS Alfred Robb, proceeded up the Cumberland River to support Union forces surrounded by Confederate units at Fort Donelson.

Arriving after dark on the evening of 3 February 1863, the Union ships caught the enemy by surprise. The Confederates besieging the fort had taken positions which exposed them to fire from the gunboats. Heavy casualties were inflicted. Fire was so well directed, that the Confederate force could not even carry off a captured caisson and retreated without firing a shot. The ships were then stationed in the area to prevent the return of the Southern forces.

=== Shelling the town of Florence, Alabama ===
Silver Lake, Lexington, and Robb shelled enemy forces from the town of Florence, Alabama, on 31 March 1863, destroying the cotton works.

=== Destroying the town of Palmyra, Tennessee ===
Still under the command of Lt. Comdr. Fitch, Silver Lake, Lexington, Brilliant, Robb, and Springfield destroyed the city of Palmyra, Tennessee, on 3 April 1863 in retaliation for Confederate guerrilla forces firing upon a Union convoy.

=== Silencing the Confederate batteries near Bell’s Mills, Tennessee ===
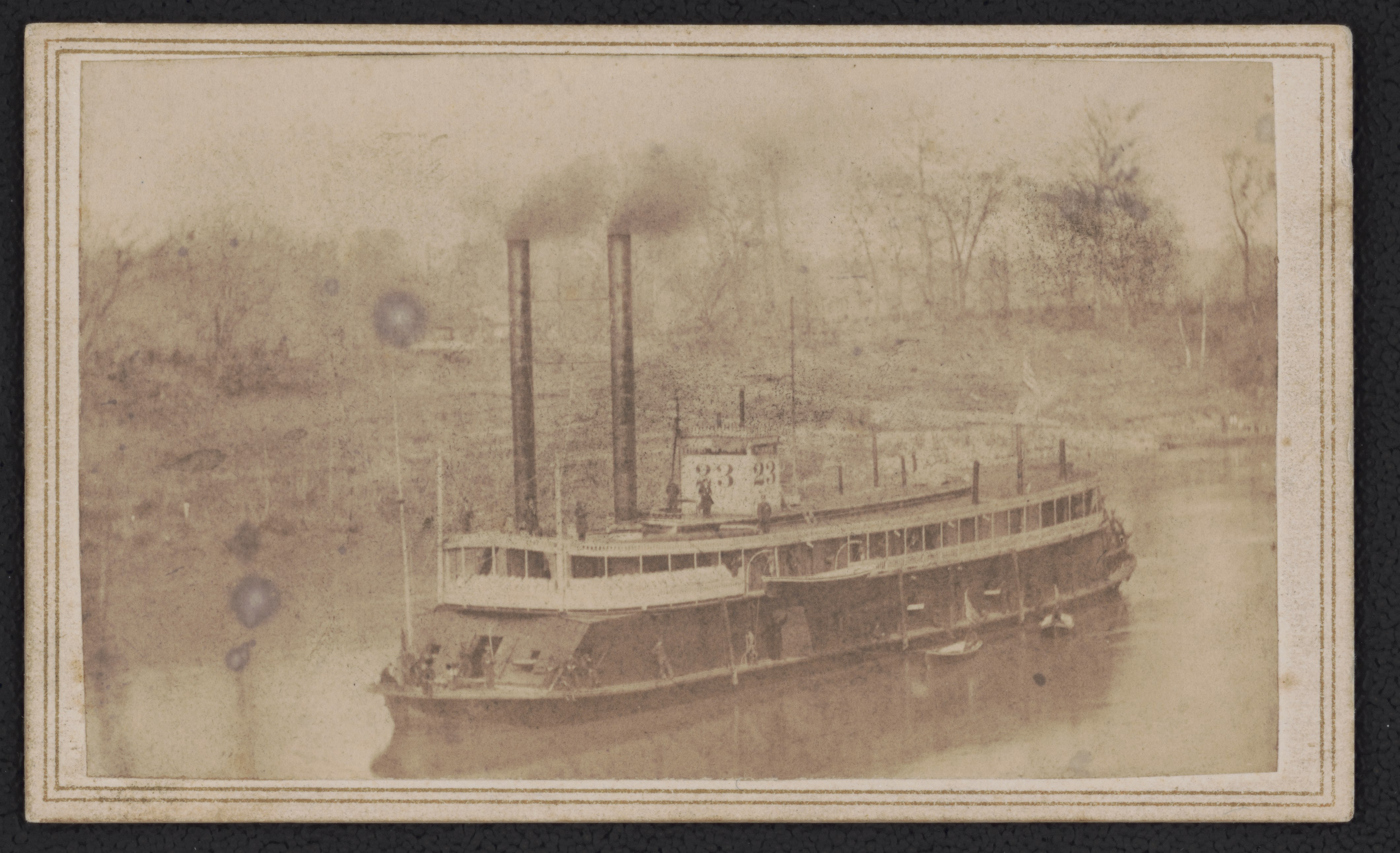

On the evening of 2 December 1864, an expedition in which Silver Lake was included, surprised Southern batteries near Bell's Mills, Tennessee. On the two following days, the expedition silenced the batteries and recaptured three transports taken by the Confederates on the 2d.

On 6 December, Silver Lake, USS Moose, Fairplay, and the ironclad USS Neosho engaged enemy batteries near Bell's Mills. Seeing that the lighter armed vessels would be destroyed by enemy fire, Fitch ordered the gunboats to return to Nashville, Tennessee.

== Post-war decommissioning, sale, and civilian career ==
Silver Lake was decommissioned on 11 August 1865 at Mound City, Illinois, and sold at public auction to J. H. Kenniston on 17 August 1865. She was redocumented as Mary Hein and had her rig changed to sidewheel by 28 September 1865. Fire destroyed the ship in the Red River on 27 February 1866.

== See also ==
- Anaconda Plan
