= Cornelius M. Hadley =

American Civil War recipient of the Medal of Honor

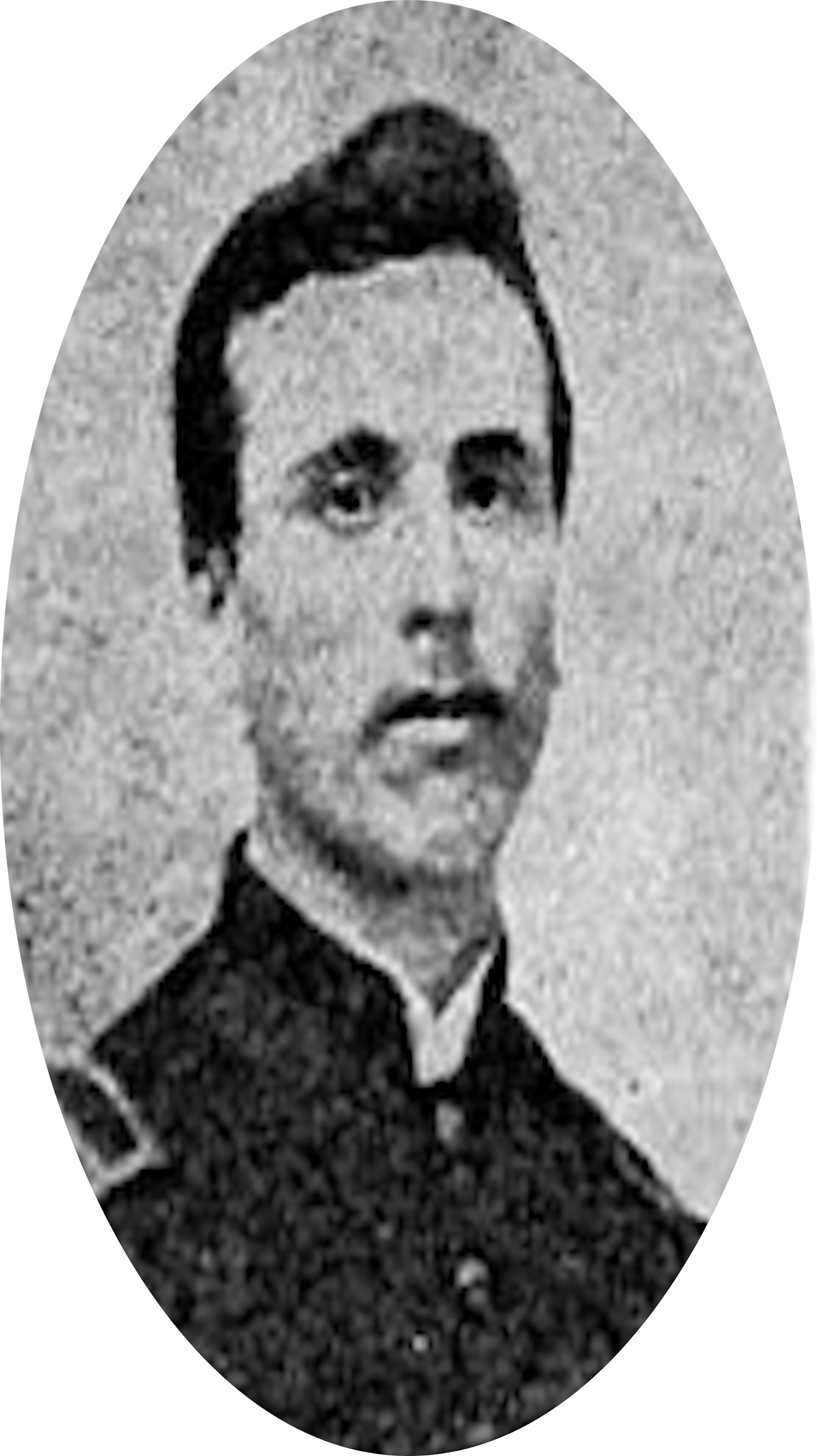
- Born: April 27, 1838; Sandy Creek, New York, US
- Died: March 22, 1902 (aged 63)
- Burial place: Litchfield, Michigan, US
- Military career
- Allegiance: United States
- Branch: Union Army
- Rank: Sergeant
- Units: Company F, 9th Michigan Volunteer Cavalry Regiment
- Conflicts: American Civil War; Knoxville Campaign
- Awards: Medal of Honor

Cornelius Minor Hadley (April 27, 1838 – March 22, 1902) was a Union Army soldier in the American Civil War who received the U.S. military's highest decoration, the Medal of Honor.

Hadley was born in Sandy Creek, New York, on April 27, 1838, and entered service at Adrian, Michigan. He was awarded the Medal of Honor, for extraordinary heroism shown on November 20, 1863, while serving as a Sergeant with Company F, 9th Michigan Volunteer Cavalry Regiment, at the Siege of Knoxville, Tennessee. His Medal of Honor was issued on April 5, 1898.

Hadley died at the age of 63, on March 22, 1902, and was buried at Mount Hope Cemetery in Litchfield, Michigan.

== Medal of Honor citation ==
The President of the United States of America, in the name of Congress, takes pleasure in presenting the Medal of Honor to Sergeant Cornelius Minor Hadley, United States Army, for extraordinary heroism on 20 November 1863, while serving with Company F, 9th Michigan Cavalry, in action at Fort Sanders, Knoxville, Tennessee. With one companion, Sergeant Hadley voluntarily carried through the enemy's lines important dispatches from General Grant to General Burnside, then besieged within Knoxville, and brought back replies, his comrade's horse being killed and the man taken prisoner.
