= Edward Hartt =

US Navy shipbuilder

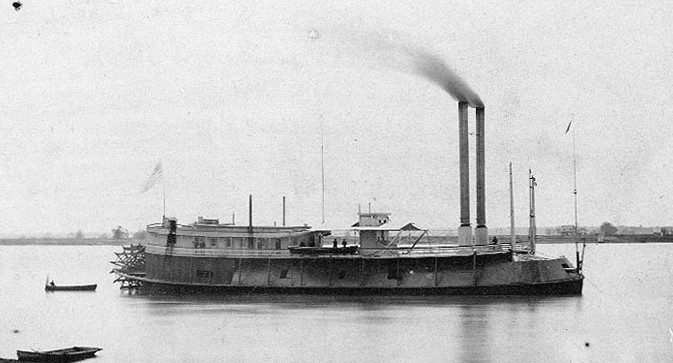
USS St. Clair, one of the ships fitted by Edward Hartt

Edward Hartt (1825-1883) was a United States Navy constructor who oversaw or participated in the construction of many prominent ironclad and tinclad naval ships used during the American Civil War.

Hart was born in 1825 in Portsmouth, New Hampshire, to ship builder Samuel Hartt. Hart was also a grandson of Edmund Hartt, builder of the USS Constitution. Edward Hartt became a shipbuilder himself and participated in the construction of the ironclad USS Monitor (1862) and various gunboats for Commander Joseph B. Hull in St. Louis, Missouri, during the Civil War. Hartt oversaw the construction of the tinclads USS St. Clair and Brilliant, the ironclads USS Choctaw and Lafayette, and the monitors USS Neosho and Osage. He also converted various other vessels to be tinclad as well. The Navy eventually transferred Hartt with Hull to the Philadelphia Naval Shipyard where Hartt was a full navy constructor, and then in 1879 Hartt went to New London naval station. He died in 1883.
