= USS Moose (1863) =

Gunboat of the United States Navy

History

United States
- Ordered: as Florence Miller II
- Laid down: date unknown
- Launched: 1863
- Acquired: 20 May 1863
- Commissioned: 20 May 1863
- Decommissioned: 12 April 1865
- Stricken: 1865 (est.)
- Fate: Sold, 17 August 1865

General characteristics
- Displacement: 189 tons
- Length: 154 ft 8 in (47.14 m)
- Beam: 32 ft 2 in (9.80 m)
- Draft: 5 ft (1.5 m)
- Propulsion: steam engine; sternwheel-propelled
- Speed: 6 knots
- Complement: not known
- Armament: six 24-pounder guns

USS Moose was a steamer purchased by the Union Navy during the American Civil War. She was used by the Union Navy as a gunboat assigned to patrol Confederate waterways to prevent the South from trading with other countries.

Moose, a wooden sternwheel steam gunboat built at Cincinnati, Ohio, in 1863 as Florence Miller II, was purchased at Cincinnati 20 May 1863, and commissioned immediately, Comdr. LeRoy Fitch in command.

== Assigned as a gunboat to the Mississippi Squadron ==
Assigned to the Mississippi Squadron, the new gunboat departed Cincinnati 2 July 1863 to patrol the Ohio River from Louisville, Kentucky, upstream. Morgan’s Raiders had captured Union ships John T. McComb and Alice Dean 7 July; Moose and USS Victory responded to the Confederate threat, arriving Brandenburg, Kentucky, 9 July.

Moose caught up with a guerrilla band at Twelve Mile Island 11 July; of the 1,500 Confederate troops trying to reinforce Morgan’s party, 45 crossed the Ohio River, 39 were held on the island and taken prisoner, some were drowned, and the rest driven back.

== Ohio River operations ==
On 19 July, Moose and Allegheny Belle shelled Confederates near Buffington Island, and captured abandoned artillery. Continuing to patrol the Ohio, Cumberland, and Tennessee Rivers during the summer, Moose had convoy duty on the Cumberland in October, and joined USS Fairplay, USS Springfield, USS Silver Lake, and Victory 8 November in defeating Confederate guerrillas attempting to cross the Ohio River. Returning from Harpeth Shoals and escorting 10 transports to Nashville, Tennessee, Moose lay below Dover 9 November planning the destruction of a guerrilla camp near Palmyra, a mission carried out with Victory in December.

== Kentucky River operations ==
She continued river patrols, reporting on construction of ships in the Tennessee River, and in April 1864 with USS Hastings and USS Fairy broke up a Confederate attack on Columbus, Kentucky. On the 16th, the Confederates attacked Fort Pillow, annihilating its 500 defenders; Moose, USS Brilliant, and Hastings were sent there to clean up. On the 29th, Moose scouted the river to Hickman, Kentucky, bringing away Unionists while skirmishing to keep guerrillas away from the river.

From May through December, Moose patrolled from Nashville to halt smuggling and control guerrilla movements. Typical operations included shelling and scattering a group of 40 cavalry at the crossing of the Memphis and Clarksville Railroads near Johnsonville 5 November, and shelling a large southern encampment above Turkey Island the same month. On 3 and 4 December, she fought field batteries at Bell's Hills, Tennessee, silencing the guns and recapturing three transports. She returned to Nashville, but hit another battery, the 15th, capturing the guns. She joined USS Neosho 17 December to escort transports compelled to return to Nashville by a strong southern force.

== A surprise attack on guerrillas on the Cumberland River ==
Moose made a surprise attack on guerrillas crossing the Cumberland at Eddyville, Kentucky, 30 April 1865, completely dispersing and demoralizing the party. Moose then returned to the Ohio and was ordered to Jefferson Barracks, Missouri, 2 July to discharge stores.

== End-of-war decommissioning, sale, and civilian career ==
She decommissioned at Mound City, Illinois, 12 April 1865 and was sold at public auction to D. White 17 August 1865. Redocumented as Little Rock 9 October 1865, she operated on the rivers until destroyed by fire at Clarendon, Arkansas, 23 December 1867.

== See also ==
- Anaconda Plan
