= 76th Ohio Infantry Regiment =

- Active: 1861–1865
- Country: United States of America
- Allegiance: United States of America; Union
- Branch: Union Army
- Type: Infantry
- Size: 962 at outset of service
- Nickname: Licking Volunteers
- Engagements: Fort Donelson; Shiloh; Siege of Corinth; Chickasaw Bayou; Fort Hindman; Jackson; Vicksburg; Lookout Mountain; Ringgold Gap; Resaca; Dallas; Kennesaw Mountain; Marietta; Atlanta; Ezra Church; Jonesborough; Sherman's March to the Sea; Bentonville

The 76th Ohio Infantry Regiment, sometimes 76th Regiment, Ohio Volunteer Infantry ( or 76th OVI) was an infantry regiment of the Union Army during the American Civil War. The regiment served in the Western Theater, primarily as part of the XV Corps in the Army of the Tennessee.

== Organization ==
Special Order Number 882 of October 1861 authorized Col. Charles R. Woods to organize a regiment of infantry at Camp Sherman, near Newark, Ohio. Recruitment had begun for a Licking County regiment as early as September 1861. Enrollment was for three years' duty. Since the majority of the troops were from Licking County, the regiment had the field nickname of "The Licking Volunteers." The regiment held 962 officers and men when it was mustered in on February 9, 1862.

The initial officers were as follows:

- Colonel Charles R. Woods
- Lt. Colonel William Burnham Woods
- Major Willard Warner
- Adjutant Jerome N. Rappleyea (1831-1896)
- Quartermaster Henry D. Wright
- Surgeon Charles R. Pierce
- Asst. Surgeon Thomas B. Hood
- Chaplain Reverend John W. McCarty

=== Companies ===
Company A formed November 1, 1861:

- Captain Thaddeus Lemert
- Captain Zebulon Parker Evans
- 1st Lieutenant Bevery W. Lemert
- 2nd Lieutenant Simeon B. Wall

Company B formed November 12, 1861:

- Captain Joseph M. Scott
- 1st Lieutenant Ira P. French
- 2nd Lieutenant John R. Miller

Company C formed December 4, 1861:

- Captain Levi P. Coman
- 1st Lieutenant John S. Anderson
- 2nd Lieutenant John V. Gray

Company D formed December 16, 1861:

- Captain Charles H. Kibler
- 1st Lieutenant I. Newton Hempsted
- 2nd Lieutenant Reason C. Strong

Company E formed December 16, 1861:

- Captain Joseph C. Wehrle
- 1st Lieutenant Michael R. Maher
- 2nd Lieutenant Charles Luther

Company F formed December 18, 1861:

- Captain Strew M. Emmons
- 1st Lieutenant James H. H. Hunter
- 2nd Lieutenant Freeman Morrison

Company G formed January 7, 1862:

- Captain James Stewart
- 1st Lieutenant Jehile T. Wintrode
- 2nd Lieutenant Richard W. Burt

Company H:

- Captain Jerome N. Rappleyea (1831-1896)
- 1st Lieutenant John A. Dill
- 2nd Lieutenant Lucien H. Wright

Company I was originally Company B of the 61st Ohio Infantry. They were transferred to the 76th OVI on February 3, 1862.:

- Captain Edward Biggs
- 1st Lieutenant James M. Blackburn
- 2nd Lieutenant John H. Hardgrove

Company K:

- Captain James M. Jay
- 1st Lieutenant David R. Kelley
- 2nd Lieutenant Mark Sperry

== Service ==
During the service time of the 76th OVI, from February 1862 to July 1865, the unit saw action in an estimated 44 battles across eleven Confederate States. Notable events were as follows:

=== 1862 ===
- February 9: Mustered in and left Camp Sherman to join the campaign up the Cumberland and Tennessee Rivers
- February 14 to February 16: Battle of Fort Donelson
- March 6 to March 31: Operations along the Tennessee River and then joined the division of Maj. Gen. Lew Wallace
- April 6 and April 7: Battle of Shiloh
- April 29 to May 30: Siege of Corinth
- August 16: Captured 40 men from the 31st Louisiana at Milliken's Bend, Louisiana
- August 18: Captured the steamer Fairplay
- October 22 to[November 12: Rest and reorganization at Pilot Knob, Missouri
- December 22: joined the Yazoo River expedition of Maj. Gen. William Tecumseh Sherman in the Operations against Vicksburg Campaign
- December 26 to December 29: Battle of Chickasaw Bayou

=== 1863 ===
- January 9 to January 11: Battle of Fort Hindman
- January 23 to April: various movements as part of Grant's Operations against Vicksburg
- May 12: Battle of Raymond
- May 14: Battle of Jackson (MS)
- May 18 to July 4: Siege of Vicksburg
- July 10 to July 17: Siege of Jackson
- July 23 to late September: camped at Big Black River
- October 20 to October 29: destroyed tracks along the Memphis and Charleston Railroad
- November 23 to November 25: Third Battle of Chattanooga
- November 27: Battle of Ringgold Gap {the colors of the 76th OVI were captured by the 1st Arkansas CSA; the colors were returned to the 76th OVI Veterans by the 1st Arkansas September 20. 1916
- November 28 to December 8: relief of Knoxville, Tennessee

=== 1864 ===
- January 1: went to winter quarters at Paint Rock, Alabama
- January 4: about two-thirds of the unit re-enlisted as veterans
- January to early March: on furlough in Ohio
- mid-March: return to Alabama
- May to September: participated in the Atlanta campaign
- May 7 to May 13: Battle of Rocky Face Ridge
- May 14 and May 15: Battle of Resaca
- May 28: Battle of Dallas
- June 9 to July 3: Battle of Marietta
- June 27: Battle of Kennesaw Mountain
- July 22: Battle of Atlanta
- July 28: Battle of Ezra Church
- August 31 and September 1: Battle of Jonesborough
- September 29 to November 3: operations against Hood's Tennessee Campaign in northern Georgia and Alabama
- October 18: non-veterans mustered out at Summerville, Georgia
- November 15 to December 21: Sherman's March to the Sea
- December 21 to January 9, 1865: provost guard in Savannah, Georgia

=== 1865 ===
- January 31 to April 1: Carolinas campaign
- March 19 to March 21: Battle of Bentonville
- March 24: occupation of Goldsborough
- April 10 to April 24: advance on and occupation of Raleigh, North Carolina
- May 24: Grand Review of the Armies in Washington, D.C.
- July 15: mustered out in Louisville, Kentucky
- July 24: discharged in Columbus, Ohio

The 76th OVI mustered out on July 15, 1865.

== Commanders ==
- Colonel Charles L. Woods - promoted to Brigadier General, August 22, 1863
- Colonel William B. Woods - Brevet Brigadier General, January 12, 1865; promoted to Brigadier General June 11, 1865
- Lieutenant Colonel Reason C. Strong - mustered out with regiment on July 15, 1865

== See also ==
- Ohio in the American Civil War
