= USS Fitch =

Gleaves-class destroyer

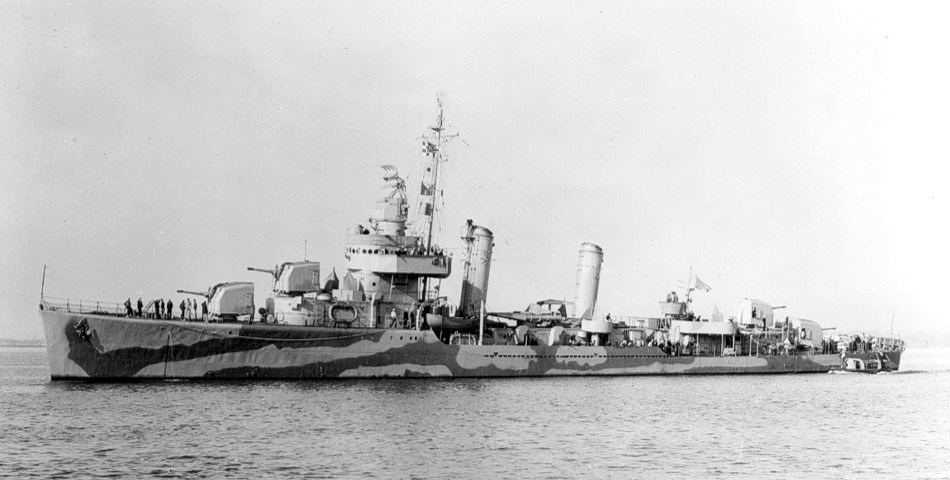
- USS Fitch underway in 1942

History

United States
- Name: Fitch
- Builder: Boston Navy Yard
- Laid down: 6 January 1941
- Launched: 14 June 1941
- Commissioned: 3 February 1942
- Decommissioned: 24 February 1956
- Stricken: 1 July 1971
- Identification: DD-462
- Fate: Sunk as target off Florida, 15 November 1973

General characteristics
- Class & type: Gleaves-class destroyer
- Displacement: 1,630 tons
- Length: 348 ft 3 in (106.15 m)
- Beam: 36 ft 1 in (11.00 m)
- Draft: 11 ft 10 in (3.61 m)
- Propulsion: 50,000 shp (37,000 kW); 4 boilers; 2 propellers
- Speed: 37.4 knots (69 km/h)
- Range: 6,500 nmi (12,000 km; 7,500 mi) at 12 kn (22 km/h; 14 mph)
- Complement: 16 officers, 260 enlisted
- Armament: 5 × 5 in (127 mm)/38 cal dual-purpose guns, 6 × 0.5 in (12.7 mm) machine guns, 6 × Oerlikon 20 mm cannons, 10 × 21 in (533 mm) torpedo tubes, 2 × depth charge tracks

USS Fitch (DD-462/DMS-25), was a Gleaves-class destroyer of the United States Navy.

== Namesake ==
LeRoy Fitch was born on 1 October 1835 in Logansport, Indiana. He was a member of the United States Naval Academy class of 1856, and served with distinction in the American Civil War and afterward. Commanding USS Moose in the Mississippi Squadron, in 1863 he pursued General John Hunt Morgan, CSA, the famed raider, for 500 miles (800 km) up the Ohio River, frustrating Morgan's attempts to cross the river and retire to Confederate territory. Commander Fitch died in Logansport, Indiana on 13 April 1875.

== Construction and commissioning ==
Fitch was launched on 14 June 1941 by Boston Navy Yard; sponsored by Mrs. H. W. Thomas, grandniece of Commander Fitch. The ship was commissioned on 3 February 1942. She was reclassified DMS-25 on 15 November 1944, and again classified DD-462 on 15 July 1955.

== Service history ==
Fitch's first mission, from 1 July to 5 August 1942, was to escort the aircraft carrier Ranger to a point off the Gold Coast, where the carrier flew off United States Army Air Forces planes for Accra. The destroyer returned to Norfolk on 5 August for exercises in preparation for the assault on North Africa, for which she sailed from Bermuda on 25 October. Screening Ranger and two escort carriers, Fitch took part in the landings at Fedhala, French Morocco, on 8 November, and guarded the carriers as they flew Army planes off to the captured airfield at Port Lyautey. Returning to Norfolk on 24 November, Fitch joined in exercises in Casco and Chesapeake Bays, and performed coastal escort duty, sailing as far south as the Panama Canal Zone, through the remainder of 1942.

On 8 January 1943, Fitch cleared Norfolk with Ranger on the first of two voyages to launch aircraft to North African bases. Operations with Ranger completed, Fitch served on patrol out of NS Argentia, Newfoundland, from 6 April to 12 May, then sailed to Scapa Flow, Orkney Islands, Scotland, to join the British Home Fleet for patrol duty between that base and Iceland. She served on this duty through the summer, protecting northern convoys, then returned to Norfolk on 9 August.

Sailing on 2 September 1943 to escort a convoy to Derry, Northern Ireland, Fitch continued to Thurso Bay, where on 20 September she embarked Secretary of the Navy Frank Knox and Admiral Harold R. Stark for transportation to Scapa Flow. Operating out of Scapa Flow for the next two months, Fitch screened Ranger as her planes attacked German forces and installations near Bodø, Norway, on 4 October, and patrolled off Spitzbergen as the men of the weather station there were relieved and resupplied.

Fitch returned to Boston on 3 December 1943 to resume coastal and Caribbean escort duty and to take part in hunter-killer operations in the western Atlantic until 25 April 1944, when she got underway from Norfolk for Belfast, Northern Ireland. In the great buildup for the Normandy invasion, Fitch escorted single ships and convoys between Belfast and Plymouth, England, and took part in training exercises until 6 June, when she sailed from Plymouth for the assault.

Arriving off Utah Beach early in the morning of the invasion, Fitch followed the minesweepers through the newly swept channels to within 2,000 yards of the coast. Her mission was to draw out and silence German batteries prior to the landings. In addition to her effective gunfire, Fitch rescued the survivors of Corry, keeping up her fire at the shore batteries as she did so. After two days screening the transport area, she returned to Plymouth for supplies, then continued to give fire support and to patrol off the beachheads until 19 June. Convoy escort duty around the British Isles was her assignment until 4 July, when she sailed from Belfast for Oran, and exercises in the western Mediterranean.

Fitch sortied from Taranto, Italy, on 11 August 1944 for the invasion of Southern France on 15 August, during which she spotted the fire of Texas as well as firing in the prelanding bombardment. Until 25 October, she supported the buildup in southern France by escorting convoys moving between Naples, Palermo, Oran, Gibraltar, and Marseille. Between her return to Norfolk on 10 November and 3 January 1945, when she sailed for the Pacific, Fitch was converted to a high-speed minesweeper and was redesignated DMS-25.

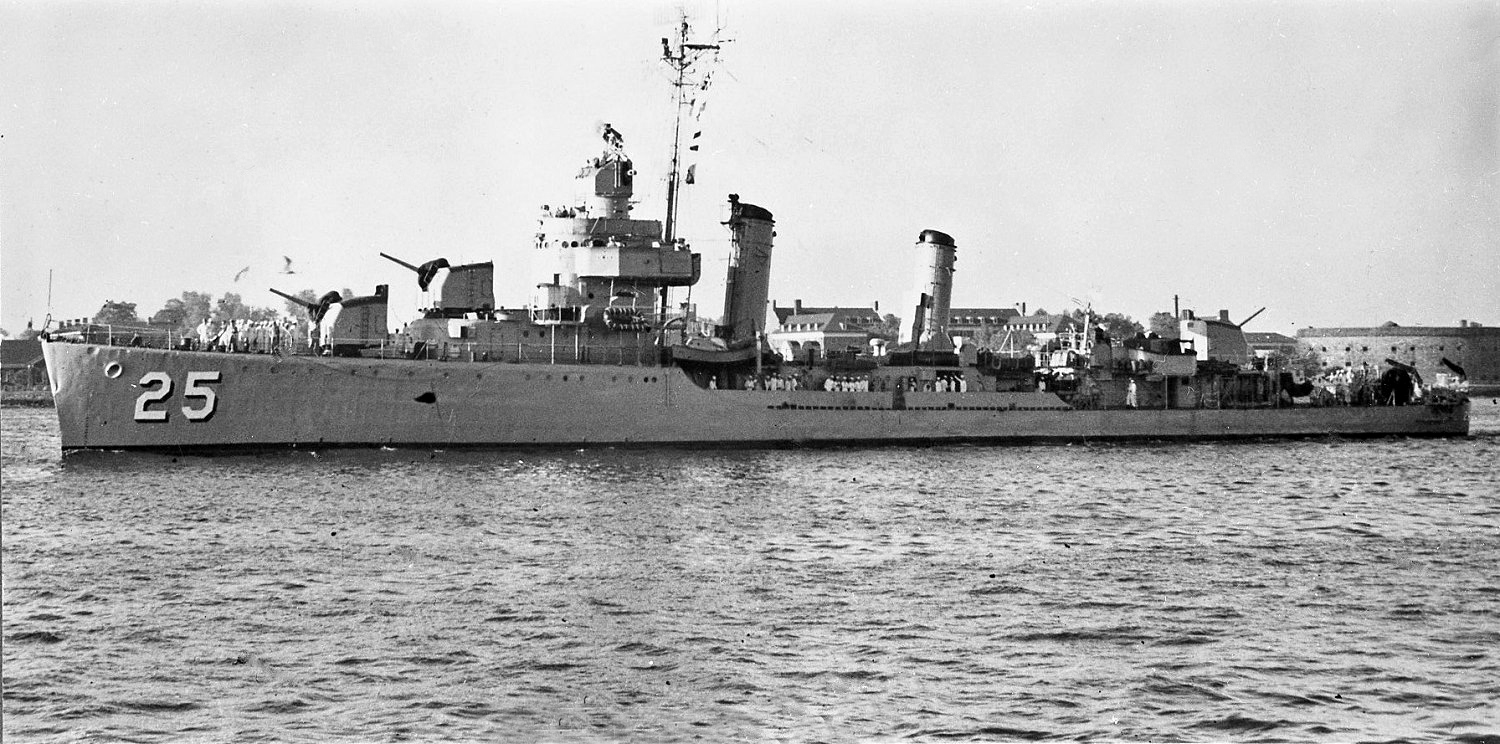
Fitch in the 1950s.

Arriving at Pearl Harbor on 10 February 1945, Fitch trained in minesweeping exercises there and at Ulithi, where her propellers were badly damaged when she ran afoul of a coral pinnacle. Repairs were made at Pearl Harbor from 10 April to 6 August, when she sailed to join the 3rd Fleet off Japan. Fitch began sweeping the entrance to Tokyo Bay on 28 August, and was present for the surrender ceremonies on 2 September. She continued to sweep off Japan and into the East China Sea until returning to San Diego on 23 December.

On 9 January 1946, Fitch arrived at Norfolk, where she was immobilized for a month. She voyaged between Norfolk, Charleston, and New York transferring minesweeper crews for several months, and in November, from her home port at Charleston, began regular operations training Mine Force officers, exercising in the Caribbean and along the east coast, and cruising to the Mediterranean in 1949, 1951, and 1953. During 1955, she conducted tests in the Caribbean for the Operational Development Force. Fitch was decommissioned at Charleston on 24 February 1956 and placed in reserve. It was sunk off the east coast of Florida in 1973.

== Awards ==
Fitch received five battle stars for her World War II service.
