= Henry M. Judah =

US army general (1821–1866)

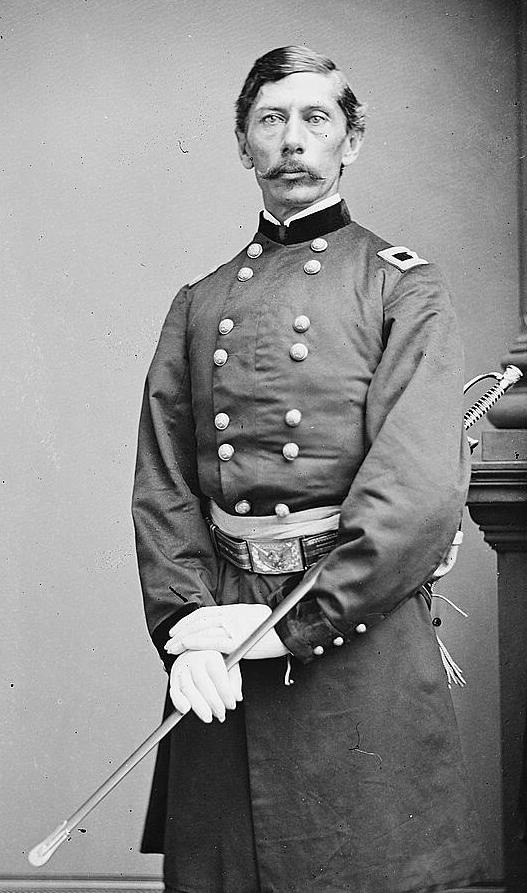
- Brig. Gen. Henry M. Judah
- Born: Henry Moses Judah; June 12, 1821; Snow Hill, Maryland
- Died: February 14, 1866 (aged 44); Plattsburgh, New York
- Burial place: Kings Highway Cemetery, Westport, Connecticut
- Military career
- Allegiance: United States of America; Union
- Branch: United States Army; Union Army
- Service years: 1843–1866
- Rank: Brigadier General
- Conflicts: Mexican-American War; American Indian Wars; American Civil War

Henry Moses Judah (June 12, 1821 – February 14, 1866) was a career officer in the United States Army, serving during the Mexican–American War, Indian Wars, and American Civil War. He is most remembered for his role in helping thwart Morgan's Raid in 1863 and for leading a disastrous attack during the Battle of Resaca.

== Early life and career ==
Judah was born at Snow Hill on the Eastern Shore of Maryland to Henry Raymond Judah and Mary Jane (Reece) Judah. His father, a native of Connecticut, was serving as a parish minister in an Episcopal church. One of his brothers, Theodore Judah, later was chief engineer of the Central Pacific Railroad and was instrumental in constructing the first transcontinental railroad. Another brother became a prominent attorney.

Judah received an appointment to the United States Military Academy, graduating 35th of 39 students in the Class of 1843. He was a classmate of Ulysses S. Grant. Commissioned as a second lieutenant in the U.S. 8th Infantry Regiment, he served on the frontier. He served with distinction during the Mexican–American War and was promoted to first lieutenant on September 26, 1847. He was commended for bravery during the storming of Monterrey, and again at the Battle of Molino del Rey and the Battle for Mexico City.

He was promoted to captain in the U.S. 4th Infantry Regiment and served in a variety of posts in the Pacific Northwest in the Washington Territory before being assigned to duty in California. His Company E was stationed at Fort Jones in Siskiyou County, where he joined the Freemasons, becoming a member of the North Star Lodge No. 91.

In 1854, Judah participated in an expedition against local Native Americans, but was too inebriated to lead his company in an attack on a group of Indians who were hiding in a cave. Instead, he stayed with the pack train and straggled far behind the column. The commissary officer, Lt. George Crook (a future Civil War general) later wrote, "It seemed that the rear guard had gotten some whiskey, and were all drunk, and scattered for at least 10 miles back. Judah was so drunk that he had to be lifted from his horse when the rear guard straggled into camp. The next day he was sick all day with the delirium tremens." Crook and other officers discussed pressing charges against Judah, but the matter was dropped when Judah promised to arrange a transfer to a new post. He then served in Placerville, California, in El Dorado County. However, Judah's reputation for bouts with alcohol would carry over into the Civil War.

== Civil War ==
With the outbreak of the Civil War in 1861, Judah was colonel of the 4th California Volunteers at Fort Yuma, a post on the Colorado River opposite the Arizona Territory. He commanded troops at Camp McClellan near Auburn, California, until November, when he resigned his command and returned to the East. He served in the defenses of Washington, D.C. for several months. He was appointed a brigadier general of volunteers on March 22, 1862 (confirmed March 24, 1862), to rank from March 21, 1862, and served as Grant's inspector general during the Battle of Shiloh.

Given field command of a division under Henry W. Halleck, Judah participated in the siege of Corinth. He received a promotion in the Regular Army in June 1862 to Major (United States) of the 4th Infantry. By autumn, he was performing administrative duties in Cincinnati, Ohio before being ordered in October to join the Army of Kentucky under Maj. Gen. Gordon Granger at Covington, Kentucky. Judah returned to a staff position during the winter of 1862-63, when he served as acting inspector general of the Army of the Ohio.

In June 1863, Judah was assigned to command the 3rd Division of the XXIII Corps, stationed in Cincinnati, Ohio. During Morgan's Raid, Maj. Gen. Ambrose Burnside ordered Judah to pursue the Confederate raider John Hunt Morgan. Judah's Indiana and Illinois cavalry under Edward H. Hobson defeated Morgan at the Battle of Buffington Island, but failed to capture the general (who finally surrendered to other Federal troops on July 26). Judah was criticized for missing an opportunity earlier in the week to snare Morgan near Pomeroy, Ohio, where his slowness in flanking Morgan allowed the Confederates to escape. He then led his command back to Tennessee to rejoin the army of William S. Rosecrans.

In 1864, Judah led an infantry division under Maj. Gen. John M. Schofield during the Atlanta campaign. Having been previously disciplined for poor performance and alcoholism by Schofield, Judah was given one last chance to redeem himself at the Battle of Resaca. In his haste to seize victory, he did not properly reconnoiter the battlefield terrain beforehand or use his artillery in the fight. It would be his last field command, as Schofield soon removed him from duty.

Judah was placed on routine administrative duty in the Department of the Cumberland until the end of the war, stationed in Marietta, Georgia. He was appointed a brevet lieutenant colonel and colonel in the Regular Army on March 13, 1865. On May 12, he received the surrender of Brig. Gen. William T. Wofford's estimated 3,000 to 4,000 Confederate soldiers. Since no crops had been grown here on the battlefields in 1864 and, as the surrender had paralyzed the local economy and government, the citizens and former soldiers lacked food, funds and employment. Judah, seeing that aid was needed to prevent suffering, issued corn and bacon to the needy until a crop could be harvested. The rations helped put the Georgians and their economy back on a sound basis, and served as a humanitarian gesture.

== Later years and death ==
After the war, Judah mustered out of the volunteer army on August 24, 1865 and reverted to his Regular Army rank of major. He served on garrison duty in Plattsburgh, New York, where he died a year later. He was entombed at Kings Highway Cemetery in Westport, Connecticut.

== See also ==
- List of American Civil War generals (Union)
