= Samuel Hartt =

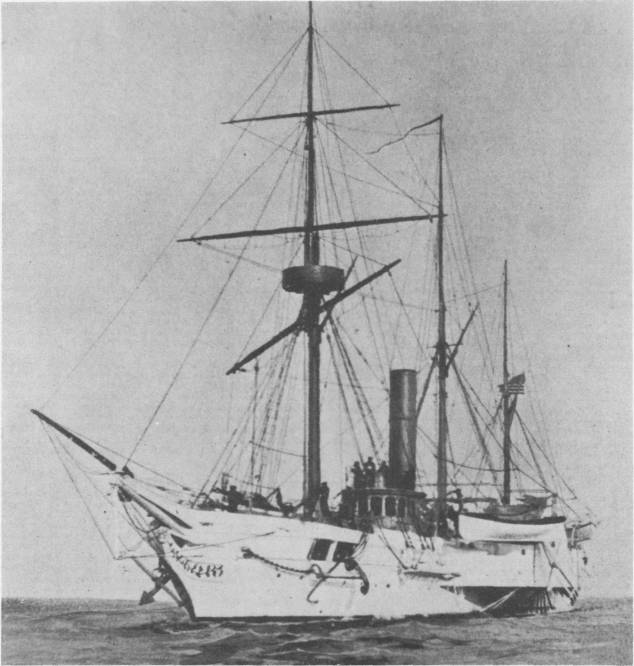
USS Michigan, the first ironclad warship of the U.S. Navy, was built by Hartt in 1843

Samuel Hartt (1786–1860) was a prominent American shipbuilder for the U.S. Navy who built various warships used from the War of 1812 to the U.S. Civil War, including the first steamship and ironclad warships of the U.S. Navy.

== Shipbuilding career ==
Samuel Hartt was born in 1786 in Massachusetts to Edmund Hartt, the builder of the USS Constitution (1797), the United States's oldest warship. Hartt's father owned a large shipyard in Boston.

Following in his father's footsteps, Hartt built many prominent ships including an early steam warship, the USS Missouri, and the first ironclad, the USS Michigan. Hartt worked in various Navy shipyards including the Brooklyn Navy Yard in New York and Portsmouth Naval Shipyard in Maine. He also built the Mount Vernon (1815) for the City of Philadelphia with his relative William Delano, and Hartt later helped train his nephew, Benjamin Franklin Delano, in shipbuilding. In 1853 Hartt served as chief of the navy's Bureau of Construction and Repair. During this time, he stated:

"It is believed . . . that a proper regard for the efficiency of our naval ships and a fair competition with those of other navies, as well as sound economy, require the building of more new ships, embracing the improvements of the age . . . , rather than continuing to make extensive repairs on old ones—the expense of which often amounts to nearly the cost of new."

== Death and legacy ==
Hartt died in Scituate, Plymouth County, Massachusetts, in 1860 and was buried in Brooklyn, New York at Green-Wood Cemetery. He was married to Mary T. Tolman, and they had several children, including Samuel Tolman Hartt (1816-1859) who was also a prominent naval shipbuilder located at the Gosport Navy Yard in Portsmouth, Virginia, and who died there in 1859. Samuel T. Hartt built the USS Powhatan, one of the last and largest paddle frigates. Samuel Hartt's younger sons Edward Hartt and Joseph were also involved in shipbuilding, and Edward constructed various gunboats, monitors and tinclad vessels.
