= James W. Toban =

American soldier (1845–1903)

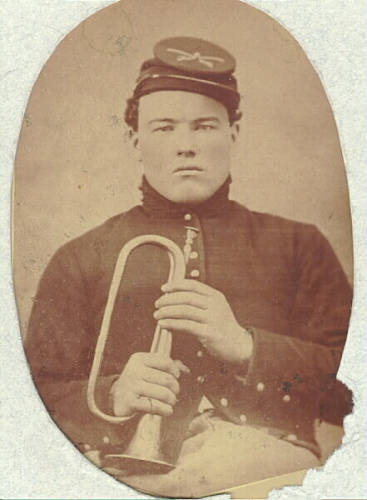
- Undated photograph
- Born: November 23, 1845; Northfield Township, Michigan
- Died: November 2, 1903 (aged 57) Lansing, Michigan
- Buried: Old St. Patrick's Catholic Cemetery
- Allegiance: United States
- Branch: United States Army
- Rank: Sergeant
- Conflicts: American Civil War
- Awards: Medal of Honor

James W. Toban (November 23, 1845 - November 2, 1903) was an American sergeant awarded the Medal of Honor for actions at Aiken, South Carolina during the American Civil War. The medal was awarded for actions on 11 February, 1865 with the 9th Michigan Cavalry. He was born in Northfield Township, Michigan and died in Lansing, Michigan.

== Medal of Honor Citation ==
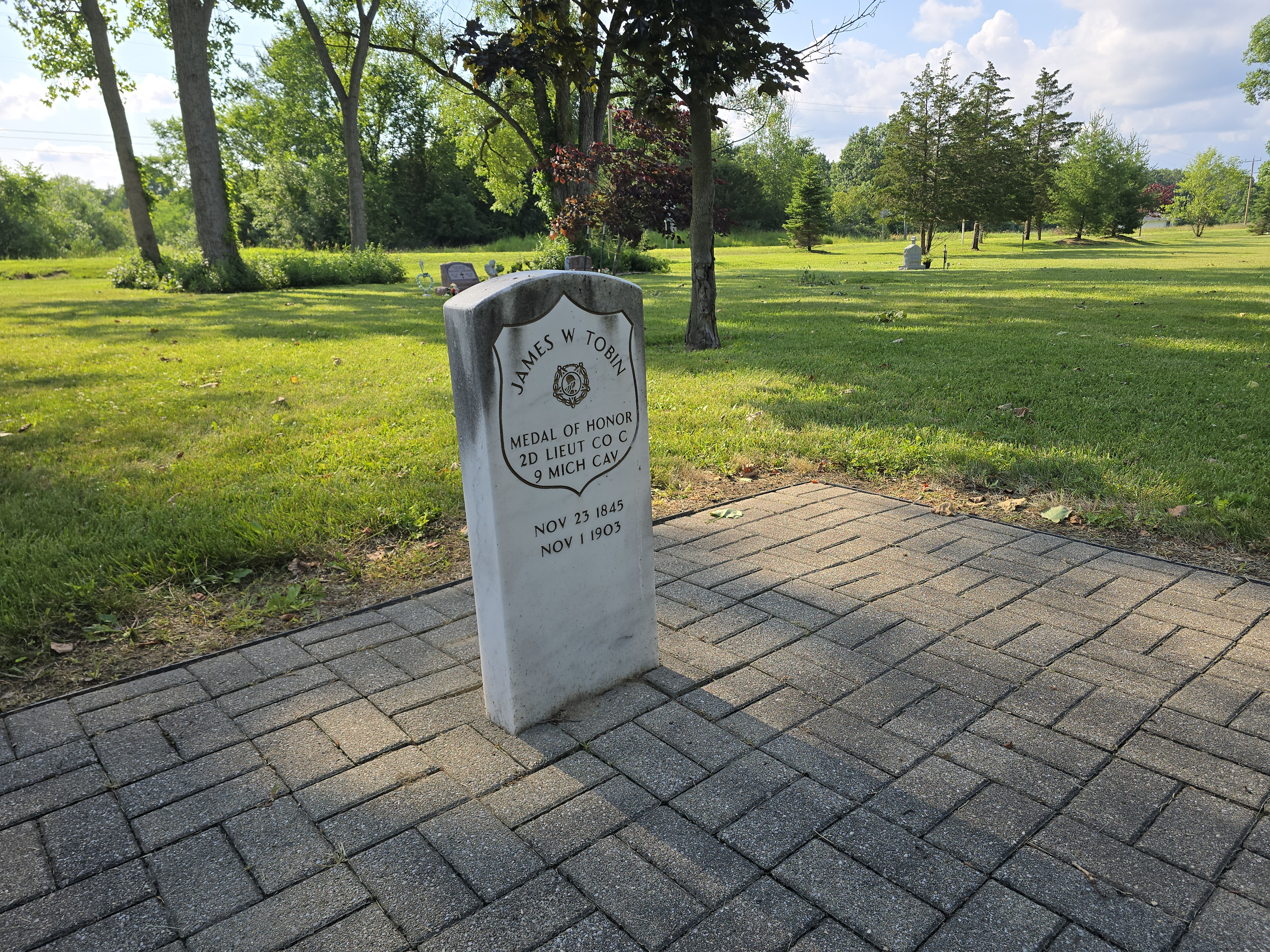
Toban's grave in Old St. Patrick Catholic Cemetery, Northfield Township, Michigan

Voluntarily and at great personal risk returned, in the face of the advance of the enemy, and rescued from impending death or capture, Major William C. Stevens, 9th Michigan Cavalry, who had been thrown from his horse.

Date Issued: 9 July, 1896
