= 13th Kentucky Infantry Regiment =

- Active: December 10, 1861, to January 12, 1865
- Country: United States
- Allegiance: Union
- Branch: Infantry
- Engagements: Battle of Shiloh; Siege of Corinth; Battle of Perryville; Knoxville Campaign; Atlanta campaign Battle of Resaca; Battle of Kennesaw Mountain; Battle of Atlanta; Battle of Jonesboro

The 13th Kentucky Infantry Regiment was an infantry regiment that served in the Union Army during the American Civil War. A soldier from the 13th appears in the third chapter of MacKinlay Kantor's Pulitzer Prize-winning novel "Andersonville" (1955).

== Service ==
The 13th Kentucky Infantry Regiment was organized at Camp Hobson near Greensburg, Kentucky, and mustered in for a three-year enlistment on December 10, 1861, under the command of Colonel Edward Henry Hobson.

The regiment was attached to 16th Brigade, Army of the Ohio, December 1861. 11th Brigade, 1st Division, Army of the Ohio, to March 1862. 11th Brigade, 5th Division, Army of the Ohio, to September 1862. 11th Brigade, 5th Division, II Corps, Army of the Ohio, to November 1862. 1st Brigade, 3rd Division, Left Wing, XIV Corps, Army of the Cumberland, to December 1862. District of West Kentucky, Department of the Ohio, to June 1863. 2nd Brigade, 3rd Division, XXIII Corps, Army of the Ohio, to August 1863. 2nd Brigade, 2nd Division, XXIII Corps, to April 1864. 1st Brigade, 2nd Division, XXIII Corps, to June 1864. 2nd Brigade, 2nd Division, XXIII Corps, to January 1865.

The 13th Kentucky Infantry mustered out of service on January 12, 1865.

== Detailed service ==
Duty on Green River, Ky., until February 1862. March to Bowling Green, Ky.; thence to Nashville, Tenn., February 15-March 8, and to Savannah, Tenn., March 18-April 6. Battle of Shiloh, April 7. Advance on and siege of Corinth, Miss., April 29-May 30. Pursuit to Booneville May 30-June 12. Buell's Campaign in northern Alabama and middle Tennessee June to August. March to Nashville, Tenn.; thence to Louisville, Ky., in pursuit of Bragg, August 21-September 26. Pursuit of Bragg into Kentucky October 1–22. Nelson's Cross Roads October 18. Duty at Munfordville and other points in Kentucky November 1862 to August 1863. Operations against Morgan December 22, 1862, to January 2, 1863. Boston December 29, 1862. Burnside's march over Cumberland Mountains and campaign in eastern Tennessee August 16-October 17. At Loudon, Tenn., September 4 to November 14. Ruff's Ferry November 14. Near Loudon and Holston River November 15. Siege of Knoxville November 17-December 5. Near Lexington December 15. Scott's Mill Road, near Knoxville, January 27, 1864. Duty in eastern Tennessee until April. March to Chattanooga, April. Atlanta Campaign May 1-September 8. Demonstration on Rocky Faced Ridge and Dalton May 5–13. Buzzard's Roost Gap May 8–9. Dalton May 9. Battle of Resaca May 14–15. Cassville May 19. Battles about Dallas, New Hope Church and Allatoona Hills May 25-June 5. Ackworth June 2. Operations about Marietta and against Kennesaw Mountain June 10-July 2. Lost Mountain June 15–17, Muddy Creek June 17. Noyes' Creek June 19. Kolb's Farm June 22. Assault on Kennesaw June 27. Nickajack Creek July 2–5. Chattahoochie River July 6–17. Decatur July 19. Howard House July 20. Battle of Atlanta July 22. Siege of Atlanta July 22-August 25. Utoy Creek August 5–7. Flank movement on Jonesboro August 25–30. Battle of Jonesboro August 31-September 1. Lovejoy's Station September 2–6. Ordered to Kentucky September, and duty at Bowling Green until January 1865. Ordered to Louisville, Ky., and mustered out January 12, 1865.

== Casualties ==
The regiment lost a total of 245 men during service; 8 officers and 50 enlisted men killed or mortally wounded, 6 officers and 181 enlisted men died of disease.

== Commanders ==
- Colonel Edward H. Hobson
- Colonel William E. Hobson
- Chief Surgeon Charles D. Moore
- Lieutenant Colonel John B. Carlisle
- Lieutenant Colonel Benjamin P. Estes

== See also ==
- List of Kentucky Civil War Units
- Kentucky in the Civil War
