= USS St. Clair =

Civil War era gunboat

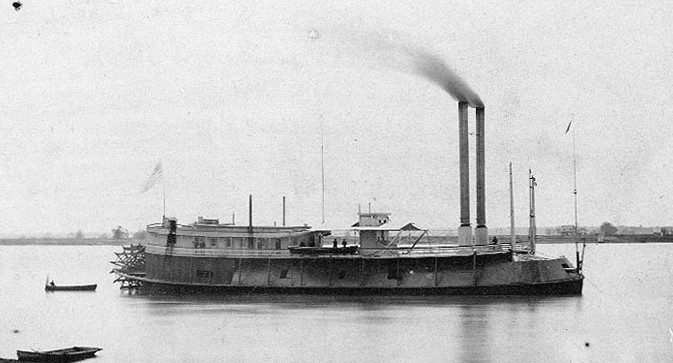

History

United States
- Launched: 1862
- Acquired: 13 August 1862
- Commissioned: 24 September 1862
- Decommissioned: 12 July 1865
- Fate: Sold, 17 August 1865

General characteristics
- Displacement: 203 tons
- Length: 156 ft (48 m)
- Beam: 32 ft (9.8 m)
- Draft: 2 ft 4 in (0.71 m)
- Propulsion: steam engine; stern wheel-propelled
- Armament: 2 × 12-pounder smoothbore guns; 2 × 12 pounder rifles

USS St. Clair was a steamer purchased by the Union Navy during the American Civil War.

She was used by the Union Navy as a gunboat assigned to patrol Confederate waterways.

== Service history ==
=== 1862 ===
St. Clair, a wooden, stern-wheel, river steamer built in 1862 at Belle Vernon, Pennsylvania, was purchased on 13 August that year by the Navy Department from R. D. Cochran et al., at St. Louis, Missouri. She was fitted out by Edward Hartt and commissioned on 24 September 1862 at Carondelet, Missouri, Act. Vol. Lt. J. S. Hurd in command. The next day, she sailed in company with Brilliant for Cairo, Illinois. For many months previous, Flag Officer Foote and Commodore C. H. Davis had commanded the victorious Western Flotilla for the U.S. War Department, gaining control of the Mississippi River from Cairo, Illinois, to Memphis, Tennessee.

On 1 October 1862, the Western Flotilla was transferred to the Navy Department, as the Mississippi Squadron, and was placed under the command of Acting Rear Admiral David D. Porter on the 15th. Davis, who had relieved Foote when the latter was incapacitated by wounds, was now appointed Chief of the Bureau of Navigation. Porter began to augment the gunboat squadron with many shallow-draft vessels, including St. Clair, and to expand Union operations on the western rivers. The squadron assembled at Cairo, from which they were dispatched to and stationed along the Mississippi, Cumberland, Tennessee, and upper Ohio Rivers. The objectives of the Mississippi Squadron were to cooperate with and support Generals William Rosecrans, Ambrose Burnside, Ulysses S. Grant, and others in combating guerrillas along the river banks; to stop the transport of arms and munitions from Mississippi to Arkansas; to punish rebel supporters living in and around the river communities; and to escort Federal troop and supply transports on the waterways. To these ends, St. Clair and her sister gunboats were successful throughout the war.

St. Clair was sent up the Ohio River on 23 October 1862 to assess rebel inhabitants of Caseyville, Kentucky, for robbery of the transport, Hazel Dell, and to close the ferries and curtail cross-river communications. She was ordered to effect reprisals against those persons known to shelter and supply guerrillas by confiscating goods and destroying property as a lesson to others. Failing to receive an indemnity of 35,000 dollars from the townspeople, St. Clair's crew arrested those who could not prove loyalty and held them on board to turn them over to the Union Army. Among those arrested were an official named William Pemberton and a notorious sutler, J. M. Scantlin, who dealt in gunpowder with the Confederates. Operating with Fairplay and Brilliant, St. Clair then engaged in providing protection for loyal citizens. During December, she operated in the Green, Cumberland, and Tennessee Rivers to restrict commerce.

=== 1863–1864 ===
In January 1863, St. Clair provided convoy protection on the Cumberland to Nashville, Tennessee, to support General William Rosecrans. In February, she participated in the relief of Fort Donelson. On 3 February, while convoying Army troop transports with Fairplay, Lexington, Brilliant, Robb, and Silver Lake, St. Clair engaged in a three-hour duel with rebels who were attacking Union troops under Col. Harding near Dover, Tennessee. Driving the enemy from their positions, the gunboats followed their retreat up the river, shelling the woods. Though firing at supposed positions and blinded by the wooded river banks, it was later found that the rebels were never able to avoid the shelling and suffered several hundred casualties. Through March, she continued convoy operations. On 3 April, at Palmyra, Tennessee, while in convoy, St. Clair was fired on by Confederate batteries and disabled when accurate shots crippled her machinery. She was safely towed away by Fairplay and later repaired at Cairo. The following day, her sister gunboats returned to Palmyra and burned the town in retaliation.

On 19 June, St. Clair was designated as Gunboat No. 19. Following repair, she departed Cairo late in June to resume escort duty for convoys bringing supplies to forces besieging Vicksburg. After the fall of that strong Confederate river fortress, the Mississippi Squadron and the Western Gulf Squadron were able to control the entire Mississippi River, though not on all of its tributaries. St. Clair was sent south in mid-September to operate between Donaldsonville, Louisiana, and New Orleans, Louisiana, in support of Union Army operations. On 17 February 1864, St. Clair was on the Mississippi River above New Orleans when a strong wind drove the U.S. 218-ton sidewheel paddle steamer Hope into her. Hope sank as a result of the collision.

Early in 1864, plans were laid down for a joint Army-Navy operation on the Red River with the prime purpose of restoring Federal control in Texas. Admiral Porter's Mississippi Squadron was to convey General William Tecumseh Sherman's forces up the river to Alexandria, Louisiana, timed with the movement of forces under General Nathaniel P. Banks and General Steele between there and Shreveport, Louisiana. The operation was to be carried out during expected high water conditions in mid-March. The major portion of Porter's fleet entered the mouth on 12 March and moved up the river. Unexpected strength in the Confederate ranks, unusual low water conditions for the year, and difficulty in coordinating movement of separate large forces overland brought about failure, to some extent, for the campaign. A portion of the fleet, some 14 vessels, became entrapped in the upper river as the Army was withdrawing from actions at Sabine Crossroads and Pleasant Hill. Only the determination of Admiral Porter and the resourcefulness of the Army engineers saved the fleet.

As they were constructing dams to raise the river to float the boats over the rocks and falls, St. Clair was ordered from Baton Rouge, Louisiana, to Alexandria to bolster defenses. On 21 April, she engaged rebels below Alexandria, and from 25 April to 3 May protected barges between Fort De Russy and Alexandria while silencing gun positions at Dunn's Bayou and Wilson's Bend. Admiral Porter now had his fleet reassembled at Alexandria and strengthened with the addition of three ironclads and a part of Farragut's detached squadron. General Banks arrived on 7 May, and they began to clear out the Red River and its tributary, the Black. St. Clair escorted the transports back to the Mississippi River and engaged rebel troops at Eunice's Bluff on the 15th. The transports safely reached Simmesport, Louisiana, at the mouth on the 21st, and St. Clair proceeded to Baton Rouge.

=== 1865 ===
The Yazoo River now became for a short time the focal point of Porter's squadron operations, while St. Clair continued patrol and convoy duty in the lower Mississippi until August when she steamed to Mound City, Illinois, for repairs. St. Clair spent the remainder of the year at Mound City. In January 1865, she escorted convoys on the Tennessee River and carried dispatches between General Thomas's headquarters and Johnsonville, Tennessee. She remained in the Tennessee River until May and was reassigned to the 3d Division of the Mississippi Squadron to operate between Grand Gulf and New Orleans. In July, she returned to Mound City where she was decommissioned on the 12th and dismantled. On 17 August 1865, St. Clair was sold at public auction to J. H. Stearn at Mound City. She was redocumented on 27 September 1865 and operated in merchant service until abandoned in 1869.

== See also ==
- Anaconda Plan
