= Edmund Hartt =

American master carpenter and shipbuilder (1744–1824)

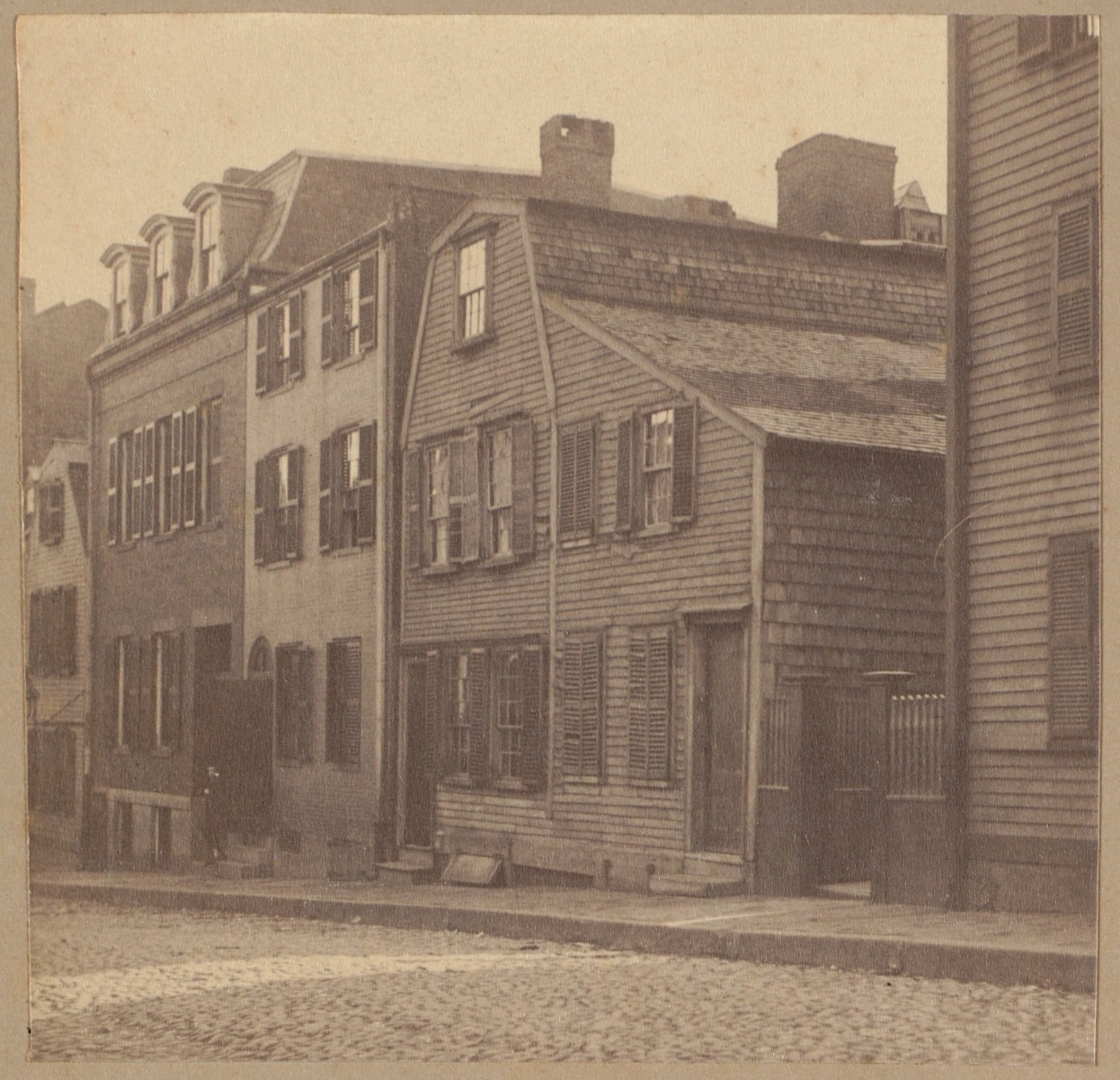
Hartt House, Hull Street, Boston, c. 1895–1905.

Edmund Hartt (1744–1824) was a master carpenter and owned the shipyard in Boston, Massachusetts, where USS Constitution was constructed in 1797. The shipyard was located in the North End of Boston, near the location of the present Coast Guard base. He also built USS Boston (1799), USS Argus (1803), and USS Independence (1814).

Hartt and his descendants lived for many years in "Hartt House" at 24–26 Hull Street in Boston. He is buried at Copp's Hill Burying Ground in Boston. His son, Samuel Hartt, was also a prominent shipbuilder for the U.S. Navy who built the first steamship and ironclad ships for the Navy.
