= USS Naumkeag =

Gunboat of the United States Navy

History

United States
- Laid down: date unknown
- Launched: 1863
- Acquired: 14 April 1863
- Commissioned: 16 April 1863
- Decommissioned: 11 August 1865
- Stricken: 1865 (est.)
- Fate: Sold, 17 August 1865

General characteristics
- Displacement: 148 tons
- Length: 154 ft 4 in (47.04 m)
- Beam: 30 ft 5 in (9.27 m)
- Draft: 5 ft 6 in (1.68 m)
- Depth of hold: 4 ft 6 in (1.37 m)
- Propulsion: steam engine; sternwheel-propelled
- Speed: 6 mph
- Complement: not known
- Armament: two 30-pounder Parrott rifles; four 24-pounder guns

USS Naumkeag was a steamer purchased by the Union Navy during the American Civil War. She was used by the Union Navy as a gunboat assigned to patrol Confederate waterways.

Naumkeag, a wooden stern-wheel steamboat built at Cincinnati, Ohio, early in 1863, was purchased by the Navy at Cairo, Illinois, 14 April 1863 from Allen Collier; and commissioned at Mound City, Illinois, 16 April 1863, Lt. Comdr. George Brown in command.

== The Union effort to control the rivers of the Confederacy ==
The Civil War in the west was largely a struggle to control the Mississippi River and its tributaries which united vast reaches of the Confederacy. As determined Federal forces wiped out Southern naval power on these inland waters, and finally won unbroken possession of the Mississippi Valley with the conquest of Vicksburg, the South selected cavalry raids and guerilla tactics as the most promising means of snatching their fruits of victory from the North.

== The terror tactics of Confederate General John Morgan ==
On 7 July 1863, three days after Vicksburg surrendered, Brig. Gen. John Hunt Morgan, CSA, attacked Union positions on the upper Ohio and captured Union steamers John T. McCombs and Alice Dean. He crossed the river at Brandenburg and raced east through southern Indiana and Ohio—burning bridges, tearing up railroads, destroying Federal public property, and terrifying the countryside.

== In pursuit of General Morgan ==
Learning of the attack the next day, Lt. Comdr. Le Royo Fitch, the Union naval commander in the region, ordered his ships up river in pursuit of the raiders. Naumkeag joined the chase on the 10th. On the 19th, the gunboats caught up with Morgan at a ford above Buffington Island some 250 miles east of Cincinnati, Ohio, and attacked, forcing the Southerners to flee up river leaving their wounded and foot soldiers behind to be captured. The Union ships followed Morgan's troops until stopped by shallow water.

== Final operations, decommissioning and civilian career ==
Naumkeag continued to operate on the western rivers through the end of the war. She decommissioned at Mound City, Illinois, 11 August 1865, and was sold at public auction there to Charles F. Dumont 17 August 1865.

She redocumented as Montgomery 16 September 1865 and served on the rivers of the South until destroyed by fire at Erie, Alabama, 19 January 1867.

== See also ==
- Anaconda Plan
- Mississippi Squadron
