= LeRoy Fitch =

- Born: 1 October 1835; Logansport, Indiana
- Died: 13 April 1875 (aged 39) Logansport, Indiana
- Allegiance: United States of America
- Branch: United States Navy
- Service years: 1856–1875
- Rank: Commander
- Commands: USS Moose
- Conflicts: American Civil War

LeRoy Fitch (1835 - 1875) served with great distinction in the American Civil War and afterward. Commanding Moose in the Mississippi Squadron, in 1863 he pursued General John Hunt Morgan, CSA, the famed raider, for 500 miles up the Ohio River, frustrating Morgan's attempts to cross the river and retire to Confederate territory. Commander Fitch died in Logansport, Indiana, 13 April 1875.

== Namesake ==
In 1941, the destroyer USS Fitch (DD-462) was named in honor of Commander Fitch, sponsored by his grandniece, Mrs. H. W. Thomas.

== See also ==
- United States Navy
