= Edward H. Hobson =

Union Army general (1825–1901)

Edward Henry Hobson
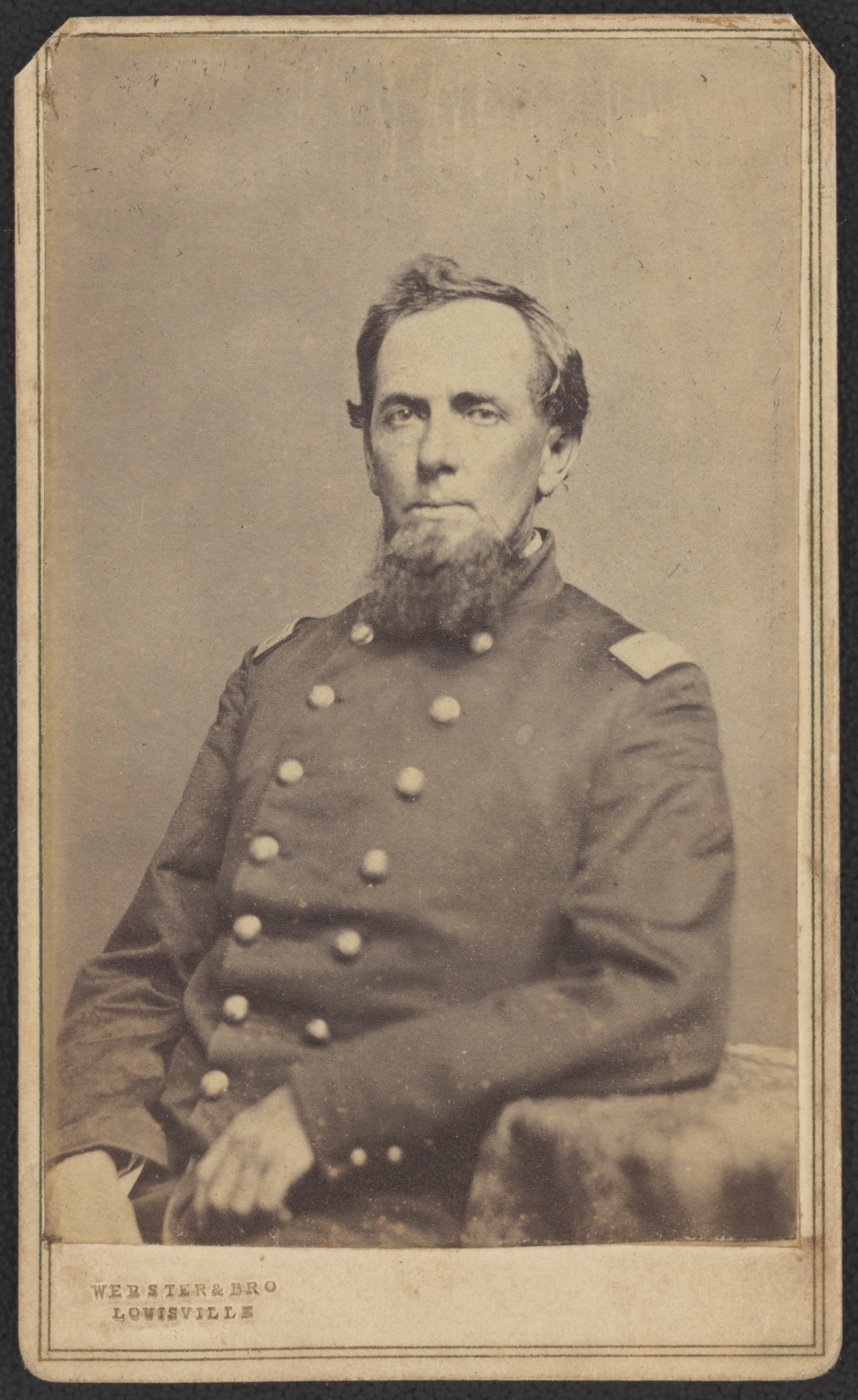
- Born: July 11, 1825; Greensburg, Kentucky
- Died: September 14, 1901 (aged 76); Cleveland, Ohio
- Burial place: Family Cemetery, Greensburg, Kentucky
- Spouse: Katie Adair
- Military career
- Allegiance: United States of America; Union
- Branch: United States Army; Union Army
- Service years: 1846–1847; 1861–1865
- Rank: Brigadier General
- Commands: 13th Kentucky Infantry
- Conflicts: Mexican–American War; American Civil War; Battle of Shiloh; Morgan's Raid; Battle of Corydon; Battle of Buffington Island; Battle of Cynthiana
- Other work: IRS Collector

Edward Henry Hobson (July 11, 1825 – September 14, 1901) worked in many roles, such as, a merchant, banker, politician, tax collector, railroad executive, and an officer in the United States Army in the Mexican–American War and American Civil War. He is most known for his determined pursuit of the Confederates during Morgan's Raid.

== Early life and career ==
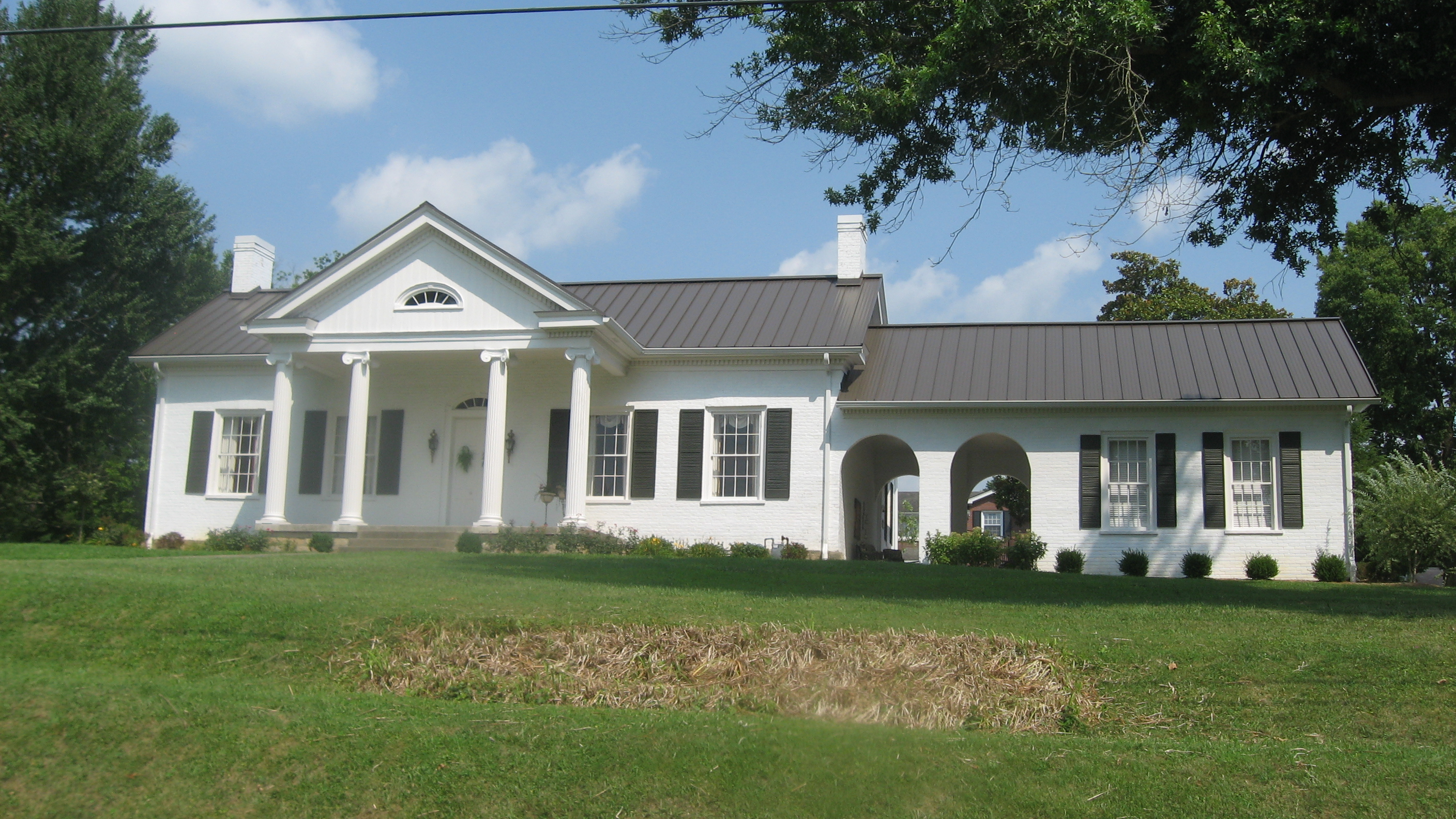
Hobson's childhood home in Greensburg

Edward Henry Hobson was born in Greensburg, Kentucky on July 11, 1825. His father, Capt. William Hobson, was a steamboat operator and merchant. Hobson was educated in the common schools in Greensburg and Danville, Kentucky, and at the age of eighteen, went into business with his father. In 1846, he enlisted in the 2nd Kentucky Volunteer Infantry and served in the Mexican–American War. He was soon promoted to first lieutenant and fought in the Battle of Buena Vista in February, 1847. He was mustered out of service four months later and returned home, where he resumed his mercantile business. He became director of the Greensburg branch of the Bank of Kentucky in 1853, and served as its president from 1857 until 1861. He was married to Katie Adair, a niece of Kentucky Governor John Adair. They had seven children.

== Civil War ==
With the outbreak of the Civil War, Hobson organized and became Colonel of the 13th Kentucky Infantry, serving at "Camp Hobson" (near Greensburg) until he moved southward with General Don Carlos Buell's army in February 1862. He commanded his regiment at the Battle of Shiloh with such success that he was nominated by President Abraham Lincoln for promotion to brigadier general. Before receiving this commission, he took part in the Siege of Corinth in Mississippi. Hobson then commanded a brigade at Perryville, but was soon relieved of his field command due to the poor condition of his troops.

Finally receiving his commission as brigadier general, he was placed in charge of Union troops in his home state of Kentucky and ordered to watch the movements of Confederate Brig. Gen. John Hunt Morgan. In July 1863, during Morgan's Raid, Hobson with three brigades pursued Morgan through Kentucky, Indiana, and Ohio. He inflicted a severe defeat upon the raiders at the Battle of Buffington Island, where he captured most of Morgan's men. He was then appointed to the command of General Ambrose Burnside's cavalry corps, but owing to impaired health, he was unable to serve in that role. Hobson again commanded troops in repelling Confederate raids at Lexington, Kentucky, later in the war. Ironically, Hobson and about 750 men of the 171st Ohio Infantry were captured by Morgan in June 1864, near Cynthiana, Kentucky. He was able to negotiate his release. He commanded a brigade of Kentucky mounted infantry and cavalry at the Battle of Saltville in October. He mustered out of the service on August 24, 1865.

After the war, he became a companion of the Ohio Commandery of the Military Order of the Loyal Legion of the United States.

== Postbellum activities ==
Hobson returned home and engaged in business. He joined the Radical Republicans and unsuccessfully ran for clerk of the state Court of Appeals, a bitterly divisive campaign that foreshadowed the following year's elections for Kentucky's governor and congressional seats. His support of the controversial Thirteenth and Fourteenth Amendments cost him the election. Hobson was a candidate for the U.S. House of Representatives from Kentucky's 4th District in 1872, but again was defeated. He was a delegate to the Republican National Convention in 1880, serving as a vice-president of the convention, and was a strong supporter of Ulysses S. Grant's candidacy. President Grant rewarded Hobson by appointing him the district collector of internal revenue.

In 1887, he became president of the Southern Division of the Chesapeake and Ohio Railway. He became engrossed in the Grand Army of the Republic. He died in Cleveland, Ohio on September 14, 1901. He was buried in the family graveyard in Greensburg, Kentucky.

Hobson's Federal style brick home in Greensburg (built by his father in 1823) is listed on the National Register of Historic Places. As of 2010, it was fully restored by its current owner Erna Hay.
