= USS Alfred Robb =

Gunboat of the United States Navy

History

United States
- Name: USS Alfred Robb
- Laid down: date unknown
- Launched: 1860
- In service: June 1862
- Out of service: 9 August 1865
- Captured: by Union Navy forces; 21 April 1862
- Fate: Sold, 17 August 1865

General characteristics
- Type: Gunboat
- Displacement: 86 long tons (87 t)
- Length: 114 ft 9 in (34.98 m)
- Beam: 20 ft (6.1 m)
- Draft: 4 ft 6 in (1.37 m)
- Depth of hold: 4 ft (1.2 m)
- Propulsion: steam engine; stern wheel-propelled
- Speed: 9.5 kn (10.9 mph; 17.6 km/h)
- Complement: 30
- Armament: 2 × 12-pounder rifles, 2 × 12-pounder smoothbore guns
- Armor: tinclad

USS Alfred Robb was a stern wheel steamer captured by the Union Navy during the American Civil War.

She was used by the Union Navy as a gunboat in support of the Union Navy blockade of Confederate rivers and other waterways.

== Operating as a Confederate transport ==
Alfred Robb – a wooden-hulled, stern-wheel steamboat built at Pittsburgh, Pennsylvania, in 1860 – operated on the Ohio River and the other navigable streams of the Mississippi watershed system until acquired by the Confederate Government at some now-unknown date during the first year of the Civil War for use as a transport.

== Capturing Alfred Robb on the Tennessee River ==
Reconnaissance probes up the Tennessee River by Federal gunboats had convinced leaders of the Union Navy in the area that Southern forces had destroyed this vessel after the fall of Fort Henry, lest she fall into Northern hands. Nevertheless, Alfred Robb remained safe and active until Lieutenant William Gwin – who commanded the side-wheel gunboat Tyler – seized her at Florence, Alabama on 21 April 1862 while being piloted by Billy N Smith (Hollar-Dam) of Paducah, Kentucky. This capture and the burning of the steamer Dunbar in nearby Cypress Creek at about the same time cleared the Tennessee River of the last Confederate vessels afloat, giving Union warships complete control of the river.

=== An embarrassing situation for the admiral ===
Gwin placed a crew of 11 men on the prize and renamed her Lady Foote to honor Flag Officer Andrew H. Foote – who then commanded the Western Flotilla of which Tyler was a part – and his wife. However, Foote found this action embarrassing and directed Gwin to restore the vessel's original name.

=== Converted to use as a Union Navy tinclad ===
Since the Confederacy still held much of the Mississippi River, it was impossible to send Alfred Robb to any Federal court then hearing admiralty cases. Hence, after the prize descended the Tennessee and Ohio Rivers to Cairo, Illinois, she was fitted out there for service in the Western Flotilla without prior adjudication. Upon the completion of her conversion to a so-called "tin-clad" gunboat, Alfred Robb began her Union service early in June 1862.

Apparently not commissioned, Alfred Robb – thereafter usually called simply Robb – departed Cairo on the night of 3–4 June; proceeded up the Ohio River to Paducah, Kentucky; and ascended the Tennessee River to Pittsburgh Landing where, two months before, Union gunboats had supported the river flank of Major General Ulysses S. Grant's embattled army, changing a highly probable defeat into a Union victory known to history as the battle of Shiloh.

== Assigned to Mississippi River operations ==
Upon reaching that small riverside port, Robb reported her arrival to Maj. Gen. Henry W. Halleck and began almost three years of protecting and supporting Union troops who were fighting to control the land between the Mississippi River and the Appalachian Mountains.

Alfred Robb reached Pittsburgh Landing at a critical point in the war. On the Mississippi River, the Western Flotilla was teaming up with the Ellet Ram Fleet to destroy the Confederacy's River Defense Fleet in a hard-fought engagement at Memphis, Tennessee. Their victory gave the Union control of the river as far south as Vicksburg, Mississippi.

=== Supporting the Union drive towards Vicksburg ===
Meanwhile, the powerful concentration of Federal forces which had prevailed at Shiloh moved south and captured Corinth, Mississippi. It then split, with General Grant pushing toward Vicksburg along a path roughly parallel to the Mississippi River while General Don Carlos Buell's troops turned eastward in the general direction of Chattanooga, Tennessee.

To check the advance of these Union forces which were penetrating deep into the Confederate heartland, defenders of the South struck back with guerrilla attacks, cavalry raids, and prolonged counter thrusts by whole armies. All these measures were designed to sever Northern lines of communication and supply. Union railroads, overland convoys of wagons, and supply ships quickly became favorite Confederate targets; and the importance of maintaining Union control of the rivers grew apace to assure Federal troops a steady flow of supplies and munitions.

=== Keeping the Ohio River safe for transit ===
Responsibility for keeping the Ohio River and its tributaries safe for waterborne Union logistics was placed on the gunboats of the Western Flotilla. On 20 August 1862, the commanding officer of that organization, Commodore Charles Henry Davis – recognizing that ". . . the gunboat service of the upper rivers had suddenly acquired a new importance" – charged Commander Alexander M. Pennock, his fleet captain and the commanding officer of the Union naval station at Cairo, Illinois, with taking these small warships under his ". . . special care . . ." with Lt. LeRoy Fitch in immediate command.

=== Beating off attacks by Confederate troops at Fort Donelson ===
Since she was already operating in this area, Alfred Robb was one of Fitch's gunboats; and – except for occasional brief assignments on the Mississippi River – she served on the upper rivers through the end of the Civil War. One of the highlights of her service occurred on the night of 3 February 1863 when she joined several other Union warships in beating off a fierce attack by some 4,500 Confederate troops against the small Federal garrison in Fort Donelson, Tennessee.

She again entered the limelight on 19 June when a landing party from her engaged a Confederate force of some 400 soldiers. Robb's commanding officer estimated that the Confederates lost about 50 men, killed or wounded, while his ship suffered the loss of only one man killed and two wounded.

== Post-war decommissioning, sale, and subsequent career ==
After the end of the Civil War, Alfred Robb was decommissioned at Mound City, Illinois on 9 August 1865. Sold at public auction there to H. A. Smith on 17 August 1865, the ship was redocumented as Robb on 9 September 1865 and served on the Mississippi River system until 1873.
