= USS Fairplay =

Riverine ship in the United States Navy

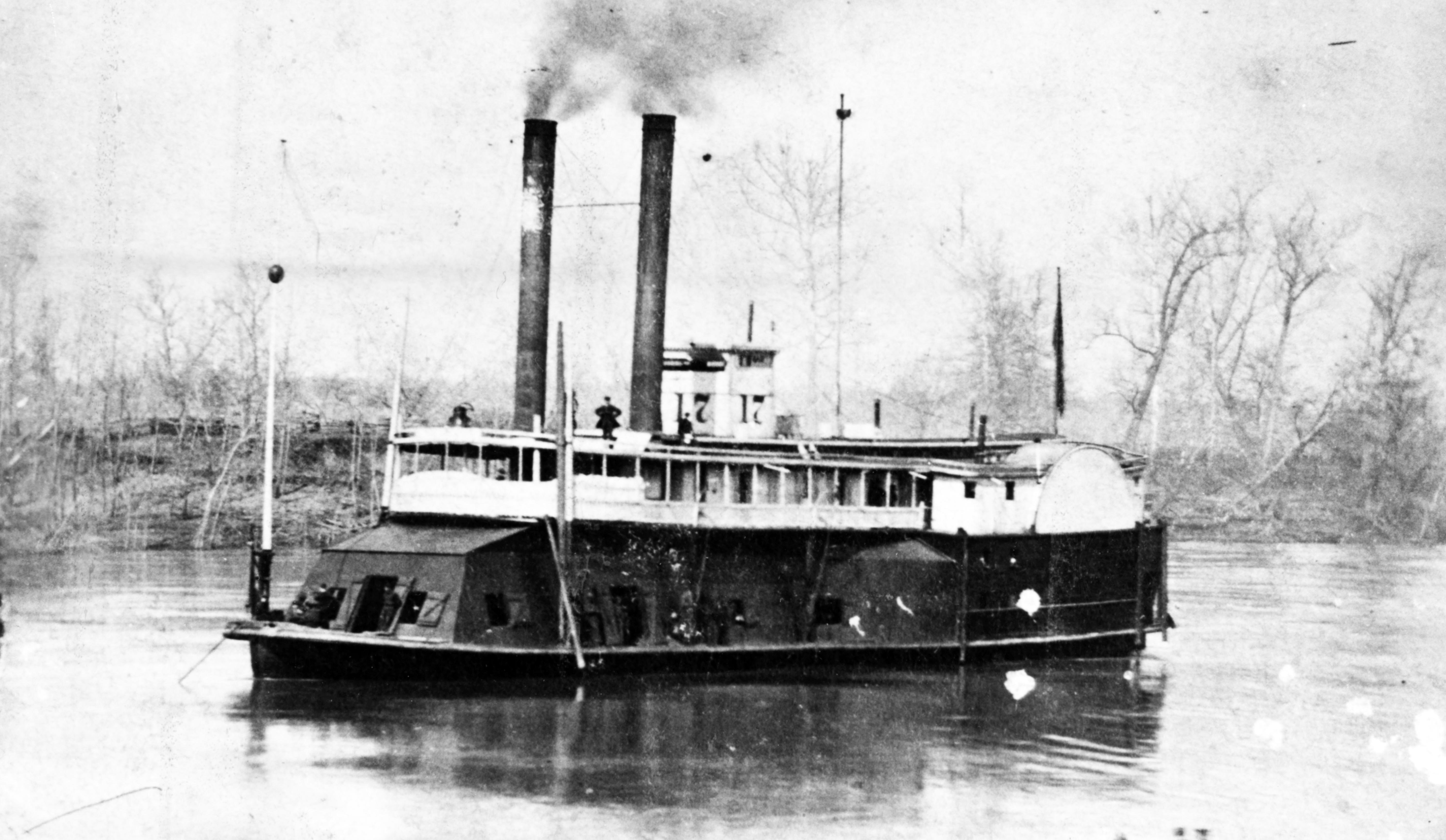
- USS Fairplay, 1862-1865

History
- Commissioned: 6 September 1862
- Decommissioned: 9 August 1865
- Fate: Sold 17 August 1865

General characteristics
- Displacement: 156 tons
- Draft: 5 ft (1.5 m)
- Propulsion: Side-wheel steamer
- Speed: 5 mph
- Armament: 4 12-pounder howitzers

Fairplay was a wooden riverine ship in the United States Navy during the American Civil War.

She was originally built in 1859 at New Albany, Indiana, for service on the Mississippi River and other waterways in the Trans-Mississippi Theater of the war. She was pressed into service at the start of the Civil War by the Confederacy, but was captured by the 76th Ohio Volunteer Infantry Regiment on 18 August 1862, during a joint expedition to Milliken's Bend on the Mississippi. The Union Army took possession of the ship, and on 6 September 1862, Fairplay was commissioned into Federal service with Lieutenant Commander LeRoy Fitch in command. She was transferred to the Union Navy on 1 October 1862.

From the base at Smithland, Kentucky, Fairplay operated with other gunboats in cooperation with the Army, patrolling the Cumberland, Tennessee, and Ohio rivers, convoying troop transports and Army supply ships, and searching out and shelling concentrations of Confederates ashore.

In August 1862 Fairplay was recaptured by the Union navy while it was transporting military supplies during the Vicksburg Campaign. On 3 February 1863, Fairplay was steaming up the Cumberland from the Smithland base to Nashville, Tennessee, guarding a convoy of transports during a lengthy campaign. She and the five other gunboats of the escort received word that the garrison at Dover, Tennessee, was under attack by a large Confederate force. The small flotilla sailed at full speed to disperse the main body of attackers, taking them by surprise, and then returned to complete the passage to Nashville.

Fairplay continued to operate in the Cumberland, Tennessee, and Ohio rivers, and on 3 December 1864, engaged a Confederate battery at Bell's Mill near Nashville. The next day, with the USS Carondelet, she recaptured two transport steamers, previously taken by the Confederates and held at Bell's Mill.

== Postwar history ==
After patrolling the same area after the war, as well as the Mississippi, she was decommissioned at Mound City, Illinois, on 9 August, and sold 17 August 1865.

== See also ==
- Seth Ledyard Phelps (Union navy captain who captured Fairplay in August 1862)
- City-class ironclad
- Blockade runners of the American Civil War

== Sources ==
- Johnson, Robert Underwood (1888). Battles and Leaders of the Civil War Vol III. New York: The Century Co.
- "USS Fairplay". NavSource.
