= Buffington Island =

Island in the Ohio River in Jackson County, West Virginia, United States

- Location within West Virginia Location within the United States

Geography
- Location: Ohio River
- Coordinates: 38°59′28″N 81°46′17″W

Administration
- United States
- West Virginia
- Jackson County

Buffington Island is an island in the Ohio River in Jackson County, West Virginia near the town of Ravenswood, United States, east of Racine, Ohio. During the American Civil War, the Battle of Buffington Island took place on July 19, 1863, just south of the Ohio community of Portland. Buffington Island is protected as part of the Ohio River Islands National Wildlife Refuge.

== History ==
The Ohio History Connection maintains a four-acre park adjacent to the island that features a monument about the battle. It also features signs that tell of the events at the battle.

Buffington descendants will appreciate Fortescue Cumming's account of river travel before the island was host to the great civil war battle. "We were here hailed by two men who offered to work their passage to the falls. We took them on board, and one proved to be one Buffington, son to the owner of Buffington's island, from whom Pickets had purchased his farm and mill.... Buffington was a very stout young man, and was going to the falls to attend a gathering (as they phrase it in this country) at a justice's court, which squire Sears, who resides at the falls, holds on the last Saturday of every month: He supposed there would be sixty or seventy men there—some plaintiffs, and some defendants in causes of small debts, actions of defamation, assaults, &c. and some to wrestle, fight, [117] shoot at a mark with the rifle for wagers, gamble at other games, or drink whiskey. He had his rifle with him and was prepared for any kind of frolick which might be going forward. He was principally induced to go there from having heard that another man who was to be there, had said that he could whip him (the provincial phrase for beat.) After his frolick was ended he purposed returning home through the woods. "He related a laughable story of a panick which seized the people of his neighbourhood about two years ago, occasioned by a report being spread that two hundred Indians were encamped for hostile purposes on the banks of Shade river. The Pickets's and some others not accustomed to Indian war, forted themselves, and hired Buffington to go and reconnoitre. He hunted, and, to use his own language, fooled in the woods three or four days; then returned late in the evening to his own house, and discharged his two rifles, giving the Indian yell after each, which so terrified the party forted at Pickets's, that the centinels threw down their rifles, and ran into the river up to the belts of their hunting shirts. The whole party followed—crossed the Ohio in canoes, and alarmed the Virginia side by reporting that Buffington's wife, and some others, who had not been forted, were shot and scalped by the Indians; but when the truth came out, they were much ashamed. "Buffington deals in cattle and hogs, which he occasionally drives to the south branch of the Potomack, where they find a ready market for the supply of Baltimore and the sea coast. The common price here is about three dollars per cwt. "Two or three years ago when bear skins were worth from six to ten dollars each, he and another man killed one hundred and thirty-five bears in six weeks."

== See also ==
- List of islands of West Virginia
