= USS Brilliant (1862) =

Gunboat of the United States Navy

History

United States
- Laid down: date unknown
- Launched: 1862
- Acquired: August 13, 1862
- Commissioned: October 2, 1862
- Decommissioned: circa early 1865
- Stricken: 1865 (est.)
- Fate: Sold, August 17, 1865

General characteristics
- Displacement: 227 tons
- Length: 154 ft 8 in (47.14 m)
- Beam: 33 ft 6 in (10.21 m)
- Draught: 5 ft (1.5 m)
- Propulsion: steam engine; stern wheel-propelled
- Speed: 6 MPH
- Complement: not known
- Armament: two 12-pounder rifles; two 12-pounder smoothbore guns

USS Brilliant was a steamer purchased by the Union Navy during the American Civil War. She was used by the Union Navy as a gunboat assigned to patrol Confederate waterways.

Brilliant, a wooden stern-wheel steamer, was built in 1862 at Brownsville, Pennsylvania, and purchased by the War Department, August 13, 1862, at St. Louis, Missouri and converted to tinclad by Edward Hartt; transferred to the Navy with the Western Flotilla October 1, 1862; and commissioned the following day. Acting Volunteer Lieutenant Charles G. Perkins in command.

== Assigned to the Mississippi Squadron ==
After undergoing repairs Brilliant sailed from St. Louis, Missouri, September 25, 1862, to join the Mississippi Squadron at Cairo, Illinois. Throughout the Civil War she operated very actively on the Ohio, Cumberland, Tennessee, and Mississippi Rivers until August 2, 1865.

== Assisting in driving off Confederate attackers of Fort Donelson ==
On February 3, 1863, she assisted in repelling the Confederate attack on Fort Donelson, Tennessee, and from December 3 until December 16, 1864, supported the Union Army's attack on Nashville, Tennessee.

== Post war decommissioning ==
Brilliant was sold at public auction August 17, 1865 at Mound City, Illinois.
