= List of shipwrecks in November 1864 =

The list of shipwrecks in November 1864 includes ships sunk, foundered, grounded, or otherwise lost during November 1864.

== 1 November ==
List of shipwrecks: 1 November 1864
Ship	State	Description
B. K.	United Kingdom	The ship was driven ashore at Brest, Finistère, France. She was on a voyage from Santander, Spain to Dunkirk, Nord, France. She had been refloated by 7 November.
Cossipore	India	The ship ran aground in the Hooghly River.
Empress Theresa	United States	American Civil War: The barque, of either 312 or 663 tons (sources disagree) was captured and burned in the North Atlantic Ocean off the Delaware Capes by the merchant raider CSS Olustee (Confederate States Navy).
Francis	United Kingdom	The barque was wrecked on the Lemon and Ower Sand, in the North Sea. Her crew were rescued by the smack Telegram (United Kingdom). Francis was on a voyage from Kronstadt, Russia to London.
Goodspeed	United States	American Civil War: The 283-ton schooner, in ballast, was captured and scuttled in the North Atlantic Ocean off Block Island, Rhode Island, by the merchant raider CSS Chickamauga (Confederate States Navy).
Isabella	United Kingdom	The schooner was run into and sunk by Lord Gough (United Kingdom) at Greenock, Renfrewshire. All hands were lost. She was on a voyage from Whitehaven, Cumberland to the Clyde.
Otter Rock	United States	American Civil War: The 91-ton schooner, carrying a cargo of potatoes, was captured and scuttled in the North Atlantic Ocean off Block Island, off the coast of Rhode Island, by the merchant raider CSS Chickamauga (Confederate States Navy).
Supply	United Kingdom	The ship was driven ashore near Landskrona, Sweden. She was on a voyage from Memel, Prussia to Newcastle upon Tyne, Northumberland. She had been refloated by 7 November.
Winslow	United States	The 265-ton screw steamer sank after colliding with another vessel at Cleveland, Ohio.

== 2 November ==
List of shipwrecks: 2 November 1864
Ship	State	Description
Aphrasia	(United Kingdom of Great Britain and Ireland) New Zealand	The 91-ton paddle steamer was en route from Auckland to Newcastle, New South Wales when she sprang a leak while just north of the Bay of Islands. While attempting to return to Russell, the intake of water increased, and the ship was abandoned at Takou Bay, just south of the Cavalli Islands.
Brilliant	United Kingdom	The paddle steamer ran aground south of Inchkeith, Fife. All on board, about 80 people, were rescued. She was on a voyage from Newcastle upon Tyne, Northumberland to Leith, Lothian.
City of Poona	India	The ship was driven ashore and wrecked near Bimlipatam with the loss of nine of her crew.
Jane Edwards	United Kingdom	The ship was driven ashore near North Berwick, Lothian. She was on a voyage from Seaham, County Durham to Montrose, Forfarshire. She was refloated the next day and taken in to North Berwick.
Ocean	United Kingdom	The ship was driven ashore at Peterhead, Aberdeenshire. She was on a voyage from Sunderland, County Durham to Lossiemouth, Moray.
Sir William Wallace	United Kingdom	The ship ran aground on the Standing Stones Rocks, off Ballyquinton Point, County Down. She was on a voyage from Troon, Ayrshire to Dundalk, County Louth. She was refloated and resumed her voyage.

== 3 November ==
List of shipwrecks: 3 November 1864
Ship	State	Description
Agnes	United Kingdom	The barque was wrecked on a reef off Hog Island, Bahamas. She was on a voyage from Guantánamo, Cuba to London.
A. J. Bird	United States	American Civil War: The 182-ton schooner was captured and burned in the North Atlantic Ocean off the Delaware Capes by the merchant raider CSS Olustee (Confederate States Navy).
Arcole	United States	American Civil War: The 663-ton full-rigged ship was captured and burned in the North Atlantic Ocean off Sandy Hook, New Jersey, by the merchant raider CSS Olustee (Confederate States Navy).
Briton	United Kingdom	The Mersey Flat was run into by a steamship in Liverpool Bay. She capsized and sank. Her crew were rescued. She was on a voyage from Morecambe to the Piel Foundry, Lancashire.
E. F. Lewis	United States	American Civil War: The 119-ton schooner was captured and destroyed in the North Atlantic Ocean off the Delaware Capes by the merchant raider CSS Olustee(Confederate States Navy).
Emma	Russia	The ship struck piles at Kronstadt and sank. She was on a voyage from Riga to Kronstadt.
Faerie Queen	United Kingdom	The ship ran aground at Cardiff, Glamorgan.
Grootzewyk	Belgium	The ship was abandoned in the Atlantic Ocean. She was on a voyage from the River Plate to Antwerp.
RMS Jura	United Kingdom	The steamship ran aground off Crosby, Lancashire. All on board were rescued. She was on a voyage from Quebec City, Province of Canada, British North America to Liverpool, Lancashire. She subsequently broke in two and was a total loss. The bow section was raised on 6 February 1865 and beached at Egremont, Lancashire.
J. W. Cheeseman	United States	American Civil War: The 215-ton sternwheel paddle steamer was burned by Confederate States Army troops on the Tennessee River below Johnsonville, Tennessee. They had captured her with a cargo of commissary stores and furniture on the Tennessee River near Paris Landing and White Oak Island on 30 October.
Morning Star	United Kingdom	The schooner was driven ashore on Lindisfarne, Northumberland.
Robert Emmert, or Robert Emmet	United States	The 178-ton sternwheel paddle steamer struck a snag and sank in the Mississippi River at St. Aubert's Island.
Stella	United Kingdom	The schooner ran aground in the Belfast Lough. She was on a voyage from Ardrossan, Ayrshire to Cardiff, Glamorgan She was refloated and taken in to Belfast, County Antrim.
T. D. Wagner	United States	American Civil War: The brig was captured and burned in the North Atlantic Ocean near Sandy Hook by the merchant raider CSS Olustee (Confederate States Navy).
Vapor	United States	American Civil War: The 312-ton schooner was captured and burned in the North Atlantic Ocean off Sandy Hook by the merchant raider CSS Olustee (Confederate States Navy).

== 4 November ==
List of shipwrecks: 4 November 1864
Ship	State	Description
Arcola	United States	American Civil War, Battle of Johnsonville: The 203-ton sternwheel paddle steamer was burned on the Tennessee River off Johnsonville, Tennessee.
Aurora	United States	American Civil War, Battle of Johnsonville: The 331-ton screw steamer was burned on the Tennessee River off Johnsonville.
Ben Muich Dhu	United Kingdom	The ship was holed by ice as Saint Petersburg, Russia.
Betsey	United Kingdom	The schooner ran aground on Taylor's Bank, in Liverpool Bay and was abandoned by her crew. She was on a voyage from Cardiff, Glamorgan to Liverpool, Lancashire.
Celeste	United States	American Civil War, Battle of Johnsonville: The barge was scuttled and burned on the Tennessee River off Johnsonville, Tennessee, to prevent her capture by Confederate States Army forces.
Chickamauga	United States	American Civil War, Battle of Johnsonville: The barge was scuttled and burned on the Tennessee River off Johnsonville to prevent her capture by Confederate States Army forces.
Doan No. 2	United States	American Civil War, Battle of Johnsonville: The 250-ton sternwheel paddle steamer was burned on the Tennessee River off Johnsonville.
Duke	United States	The 123-ton sternwheel paddle steamer burned on the Cumberland River in Tennessee.
Eagle Coal Co.	United States	American Civil War, Battle of Johnsonville: The barge was scuttled and burned on the Tennessee River off Johnsonville to prevent her capture by Confederate States Army forces.
Eleanore	France	The chasse-marée was driven ashore between Wells-next-the-Sea and Blakeney, Norfolk, United Kingdom. Her four crew were rescued by the Blakeney Lifeboat.
USS Elfin	United States Navy	American Civil War, Battle of Johnsonville: Heavily damaged by Confederate States Army artillery, the tinclad gunboat was burned by her crew in the Tennessee River off Johnsonville.
Goody Friends	United States	American Civil War, Battle of Johnsonville: The 195-ton sternwheel paddle steamer was burned by Union forces on the Tennessee River off Johnsonville to prevent her capture by Confederate States Army troops.
Hibernian	United Kingdom	The steamship ran aground in the Saint Lawrence River at Montreal, Province of Canada, British North America.
J. B. Ford	United States	American Civil War, Battle of Johnsonville: The 197-ton steamer was burned by Union forces on the Tennessee River off Johnsonville to prevent her capture by Confederate States Army troops.
J. H. Doane	United States	American Civil War, Battle of Johnsonville: The barge was scuttled and burned on the Tennessee River off Johnsonville,, to prevent her capture by Confederate States Army forces.
John Gladstone	United Kingdom	The ship was severely damaged by fire at New York, United States. She was scuttled.
Josephine	United States	American Civil War, Battle of Johnsonville: The barge was scuttled and burned on the Tennessee River off Johnsonville, to prevent her capture by Confederate States Army forces.
Kentucky	United States	American Civil War, Battle of Johnsonville: The barge was scuttled and burned on the Tennessee River off Johnsonville, to prevent her capture by Confederate States Army forces.
USS Key West	United States Navy	American Civil War, Battle of Johnsonville: Heavily damaged by Confederate States Army artillery, the gunboat was run aground and burned by her crew in the Tennessee River off Johnsonville, to prevent her capture by Confederate States Army forces.
Mahoning	United States	During a voyage from Green Bay, Wisconsin, to Chicago, Illinois, with a cargo of lumber, the 119-foot (36 m) brigantine was stranded during a gale in Lake Michigan near the mouth of the Black River 4 miles (6.4 km) south of Sheboygan, Wisconsin. She was eventually refloated, but sank under tow to Milwaukee, Wisconsin, on 2 December 1864.
Mountaineer	United States	American Civil War, Battle of Johnsonville: The 211-ton sternwheel paddle steamer was burned by Union forces on the Tennessee River off Johnsonville.
HMS Racehorse	Royal Navy	The Cormorant-class gunvessel was wrecked 5 leagues (15 nautical miles (28 km)) south east of Chefoo, China with the loss of all but nine of her 108 crew. Survivors were rescued by a junk. She was on a voyage from Shanghai to Chefoo.
USS Tawah	United States Navy	American Civil War, Battle of Johnsonville: Heavily damaged by Confederate States Army artillery, the gunboat was burned by her crew in the Tennessee River off Johnsonville.
T. H. U. S. 57	United States	American Civil War, Battle of Johnsonville: The barge was scuttled and burned on the Tennessee River off Johnsonville, to prevent her capture by Confederate States Army forces.
Undine	Confederate States of America	American Civil War, Battle of Johnsonville: Operated by a Confederate crew after her capture on 30 October by Confederate forces but not renamed or commissioned into Confederate States Navy service, the gunboat was burned by her crew in the Tennessee River off Reynoldsburg Island near Johnsonville. She exploded when the flames reached her ammunition magazine.
U.S. No. 22	United States	American Civil War, Battle of Johnsonville: The barge was scuttled and burned on the Tennessee River off Johnsonville, to prevent her capture by Confederate States Army forces.
U.S. No. 44	United States	American Civil War, Battle of Johnsonville: The barge was scuttled and burned on the Tennessee River off Johnsonville, to prevent her capture by Confederate States Army forces.
Venus	United States	American Civil War, Battle of Johnsonville: The 235-ton sternwheel paddle steamer was burned by Union forces on the Tennessee River off Johnsonville to prevent her capture by Confederate States Army forces.
Vera Cruz	Austrian Empire	The brig foundered in the Mediterranean Sea. Her crew were rescued by the brig L'Indifferente (Italy). Vera Cruz was on a voyage from Liverpool to Alexandria, Egypt.
Vibelia	United Kingdom	The schooner was wrecked on the Half Moon Shoal, off Palawan, Spanish East Indies. She was on a voyage from Labuan, Malaya to Hong Kong.
Vivid	United Kingdom	The ship sank 4 nautical miles (7.4 km) off the Bird Rocks. Her crew were rescued. She was on a voyage from Aux Cayes, Haiti to Glasgow, Renfrewshire.
Whale No. 8	United States	American Civil War, Battle of Johnsonville: The barge was scuttled and burned on the Tennessee River off Johnsonville, to prevent her capture by Confederate States Army forces.
Two unnamed barges	United States	American Civil War, Battle of Johnsonville: The barges were scuttled and burned on the Tennessee River off Johnsonville, to prevent her capture by Confederate States Army forces.

== 5 November ==
List of shipwrecks: 5 November 1864
Ship	State	Description
Briton	United Kingdom	The ship was driven ashore on Skagen, Denmark. She was on a voyage from Lowestoft, Suffolk to Gothenburg, Sweden. She had become a wreck by 16 November.
Charter Oak	United States	American Civil War: The 150-ton schooner was captured and burned in the North Atlantic Ocean by the merchant raider CSS Shenandoah (Confederate States Navy).
Clarinda	United Kingdom	The barque was wrecked on Anticosti Island, Nova Scotia, British North America. Her crew were rescued on 17 November by the steamship St. Andrew (United Kingdom). Clarinda was on a voyage from the Clyde to Quebec City, Province of Canada, British North America.
Constellation	United Kingdom	The ship sank off Læsø, Denmark.
Deerhound	United Kingdom	The ship ran aground in the River Wear. She was on a voyage from Hartlepool to Sunderland, County Durham. She was refloated with the assistance of some tugs.
Delaval	United Kingdom	The brig was driven ashore and wrecked at Salthouse, Norfolk. She was on a voyage from Sunderland to Rochester, Kent.
Fawn	United States	American Civil War: The 25-ton steamer was captured and burned at the Buffalo Shoals on the Big Sandy River between Kentucky and West Virginia by the Confederate 34th Virginia Cavalry Battalion. (This may be the same shipwreck as the 11 November shipwreck of a steamer named Fawn).
James White	United States	American Civil War: The 662-ton sidewheel paddle steamer struck a snag and sank in 13 feet (4.0 m) of water in the Mississippi River at Island Number Ten with the loss of 15 lives.
Mentor	United Kingdom	The brig ran aground on the Cross Sand, in the North Sea off the coast of Norfolk. She was on a voyage from Gothenburg to London. She was refloated and towed in to Lowestoft, Suffolk in a severely leaky condition.
Nidelven	Norway	The barque ran aground on the Finngrund, in the Gulf of Bothnia. She was on a voyage from Sundsvall, Sweden to Algiers, Algeria. She was later refloated and taken in to Helsingør, Denmark, where she arrived on 16 November.
Orel	Sweden	The ship was driven ashore at Dragør, Denmark. She was on a voyage from Havre de Grâce, Seine-Inférieure, France to Stockholm. She was later refloated and taken in to Copenhagen, Denmark in a leaky condition.
Prince Carl	Wismar	The ship sprang a leak and was abandoned in the Baltic Sea. her crew were rescued.
R. H. Barnum	United States	American Civil War: The 30-ton sternwheel paddle steamer was captured and burned at the Buffalo Shoals by the Confederate 34th Virginia Cavalry Battalion.
Shannon	United Kingdom	The paddle tug heeled over and sank in the River Tyne at Wylam, Northumberland.
Wolfahrt	Flag unknown	The barque was driven ashore, capsized and was wrecked at Folstrup, Denmark with the loss of four of her eleven crew.
Unidentified sloop	United Kingdom	American Civil War, Union blockade: The sloop, loaded with cotton and turpentine, ran aground on Sullivan's Island in front of Fort Moultrie at Charleston, Confederate States of America. The monitor USS Patapsco (United States Navy) shelled her, hitting her three times and setting her afire.

== 6 November ==
List of shipwrecks: 6 November 1864
Ship	State	Description
Anna	Stettin	The schooner was driven ashore near Stolpemünde, Kingdom of Prussia. She was on a voyage from Stettin to Norrköping, Sweden. Anna was repaired on the beach. She was refloated on 7 April 1865 and taken in to Stolpemünde.
Blakeney	United Kingdom	The ship was driven ashore and wrecked at Sea Palling, Norfolk. Her crew were rescued. She was on a voyage from Sunderland, County Durham to Mistley, Essex.
Brothericks	United Kingdom	The ship was abandoned in the North Sea off Borkum, Kingdom of Hanover. Her crew were rescued by Marianne (Flag unknown). Brothericks was on a voyage from South Shields, County Durham to Hamburg.
Clifford and William	United Kingdom	The fishing smack was run down and sunk in the North Sea off Lowestoft, Suffolk by the steamship Lady Havelock (United Kingdom) with the loss of two of her nine crew. Survivors were rescued by Lady Havelock.
Dorothea	United Kingdom	The ship was driven ashore and wrecked at Swinemünde, Prussia. She was on a voyage from Charlestown, Cornwall to Stettin.
Elvira	United Kingdom	The brig was driven ashore and wrecked at Sea Palling. Her crew were rescued. She was on a voyage from South Shields to Rouen, Seine-Inférieure, France.
Emma Anderson	United Kingdom	The schooner was driven ashore on Long Island, New York. She was on a voyage from St Martin's to New York City. She was refloated on 4 December.
John Grey	United Kingdom	The full-rigged ship ran aground and sank at Honfleur, Calvados, France . She was on a voyage from Newcastle upon Tyne, Northumberland to Honfleur.
Helen	United Kingdom	The brig ran aground and sank at Honfleur. She was on a voyage from Newcastle upon Tyne to Honfleur.
Mary	United Kingdom	The ship ran aground on the Sandwich Flats. She was on a voyage from Hartlepool, County Durham to Sandwich, Kent. She was refloated with the assistance of a tug and towed in to Sandwich, where she sank.
Toluus	United Kingdom	The ship ran aground on the London Chest, in the Baltic Sea and was abandoned. She was on a voyage from Hull, Yorkshire to Kronstadt, Russia.
William West	United States	The ship was abandoned in the Atlantic Ocean. Her crew were rescued by Pioneer (United Kingdom). William West was on a voyage from Antwerp, Belgium to New York.

== 7 November ==
List of shipwrecks: 7 November 1864
Ship	State	Description
Active	United Kingdom	The ship was driven ashore on Saaremaa, Russia with the loss of three of her crew.
Alexandria	United Kingdom	The barque ran aground on the Bredegrund, in the Baltic Sea. She was on a voyage from Kronstadt to Kirkcaldy, Fife.
Anna	Sweden	The ship was driven ashore at Kalmar. Her crew were rescued.
Buckskin	United States	American Civil War: After being captured by Confederate guerrillas, the sloop was recaptured and burned on Chopawamsic Creek by the armed screw steamer USS Anacostia (United States Navy).
Carl Auguste	Sweden	The ship sank at Kalmar with the loss of all hands.
Courrieren	Sweden	The ship was driven ashore at Kalmar. Her crew were rescued.
Elize Vivian	Sweden	The ship was driven out to sea from Kalmar and was reported as missing.
Emily Johan	Flag unknown	The ship was driven ashore at Kalmar. Her crew were rescued.
Express	United Kingdom	The ship was driven ashore at Kalmar. Her crew were rescued.
Fazela	Sweden	The ship was driven out to sea from Kalmar and was reported as missing.
Johann Petten	Sweden	The ship was driven ashore at Kalmar. Her crew were rescued.
Josephine	Flag unknown	The ship was wrecked at Visby, Sweden. She was on a voyage from Sundsvall, Sweden to "Hollenau".
Mesto	Sweden	The ship was driven ashore at Kalmar. Her crew were rescued.
Niels Osten	Sweden	The ship was driven ashore at Kalmar. Her crew were rescued.
N. M. Terry	United States	The Brigantine ran ground on French Reef, Key Largo, Florida and was wrecked.
Petten	Netherlands	The ship was driven ashore at Kalmar.
Rosetta	Danzig	The ship was abandoned in the Baltic Sea. She was on a voyage from Vyborg, Grand Duchy of Finland to Newcastle upon Tyne, Northumberland, United Kingdom. She came ashore at Libau, Courland Governorate on 9 November.
Telegraphen	Sweden	The ship was driven ashore at Kalmar. Her crew were rescued.
Vesta	United Kingdom	The barque ran aground on the Lemon and Ower Sand, in the North Sea off the coast of Norfolk. She was on a voyage from South Shields, County Durham to Adra, Spain. She was refloated with the assistance of a smack and taken in to Great Yarmouth Norfolk and consequently put back to South Shields.
Vivian	Flag unknown	The ship was driven out to sea from Kalmar and was reported as missing.

== 8 November ==
List of shipwrecks: 8 November 1864
Ship	State	Description
Catherine	(United Kingdom of Great Britain and Ireland) New Zealand	The schooner left Lyttelton for the North Island on 8 November, laden with coal. Wreckage was spotted later the same day by the captain of the steamer Mullogh ( (United Kingdom of Great Britain and Ireland) New Zealand), which was identified as belonging to the Catherine. It is believed that the schooner, which was in a poor condition, had been overloaded.
Demath	United Kingdom	The ship was driven ashore at Kalmar, Sweden. She was on a voyage from Hartlepool, County Durham to Kalmar.
Demuth	Russia	The ship was driven ashore at Riga. She was on a voyage from Hartlepool to Riga.
D. Godfrey	United States	American Civil War: Carrying a cargo of mess beef and pork from Boston, Massachusetts, the 299-ton barque was captured, burned, and sunk in the North Atlantic Ocean southwest of the Cape Verde Islands (4°42′N 28°24′W) by the merchant raider CSS Shenandoah (Confederate States Navy) on either 7 or 8 November.
Donna Ann	United Kingdom	The barque ran aground at Bangkok, Siam and broke in two. She was on a voyage from Saigon, French Cochinchina to Shanghai, China.
Fisherman	United Kingdom	The ship was driven ashore on Öland, Sweden. She was on a voyage from Ventava, Courland Governorate to Lowestoft, Suffolk.
Mayflower	United Kingdom	The ship was driven ashore near Treptow, Prussia. She was on a voyage from Kronstadt, Russia to London. She was reported to have become a wreck by 14 November, but was refloated in December and taken in to Treptow.
Pensher	United Kingdom	The brig sank off Langeoog, Kingdom of Hanover. Her crew were rescued. She was on a voyage from Sunderland, County Durham to Hamburg.
Pioneer	United Kingdom	The ship was driven ashore and wrecked 5 nautical miles (9.3 km) from Libau, Courland Governorate. Her crew were rescued. She was on a voyage from London to Riga, Russia. Pioneer was refloated on 12 November with the assistance of two steamships and was towed in to Libau.
Renown	United Kingdom	The barque ran aground at Fife Ness, Fife. She was on a voyage from Riga to Grangemouth, Stirlingshire. She was refloated and taken in tow for Grangemouth.
Stranger	United Kingdom	The barque ran aground in the Dardanelles. She was refloated.

== 9 November ==
List of shipwrecks: 9 November 1864
Ship	State	Description
Blarney	United Kingdom	The steamship was driven ashore near Varna, Ottoman Empire. Her crew were rescued. She had broken up by 12 November.
Buenos Ayres	United Kingdom	The ship was run down and sunk by Jamie (United Kingdom) with the loss of seventeen of her nineteen crew.
Elizabeth Hill	United Kingdom	The ship was driven ashore and damaged at Fécampl, Seine-Inférieure, France. She was refloated.
Marco Polo	United Kingdom	The ship foundered off Douglas, New Brunswick, British North America. Her crew were rescued. She was on a voyage from Newcastle upon Tyne, Northumberland to Saint John, New Brunswick.
Stella	United Kingdom	The schooner ran aground on the Hook Sand, in the English Channel off the coast of Dorset. She was on a voyage from Penarth, Glamorgan to Stockton-on-Tees, County Durham. She was refloated the next day and towed in to Poole, Dorset.

== 10 November ==
List of shipwrecks: 10 November 1864
Ship	State	Description
Anna	United Kingdom	The ship was driven ashore at Jershöft, Prussia. She was on a voyage from Hudiksvall, Sweden to London.
Bosetta	Stettin	The ship collided with another vessel and was wrecked at Leba, Prussia.
Charlotte	Prussia	The ship was abandoned in the Atlantic Ocean. Her crew were rescued by British Empress (United Kingdom). Charlotte was on a voyage from Quebec City, Province of Canada, British North America to Antwerp, Belgium.
Monica	United Kingdom	The ship was driven ashore in the River Mersey. She was on a voyage from Quebec City, Province of Canada, British North America to Liverpool, Lancashire. She was refloated.
Perth	United Kingdom	The hulk was severely damaged by fire at Deptford, Kent.
Powerful	United Kingdom	The steamship sank at North Shields, Northumberland.
Susan	United States	American Civil War: The 134-ton brigantine was captured and scuttled in the North Atlantic Ocean southwest of the Cape Verde Islands by the merchant raider CSS Shenandoah (Confederate States Navy).
Sydney Packet	United Kingdom	The ship struck a sunken rock and foundered in the North Sea 20 nautical miles (37 km) north east of Flamborough Head, Yorkshire. Her crew were rescued. She was on a voyage from Sunderland,, County Durham to Dunkirk, Nord, France.
William	United Kingdom	The barque departed from Hartlepool, County Durham for London. Presumed subsequently foundered off Lowestoft, Suffolk with the loss of all hands on or about 17 November. She may have collided with the barque George Stephenson (United Kingdom).

== 11 November ==
List of shipwrecks: 11 November 1864
Ship	State	Description
Fawn	United States	The 36-ton sternwheel paddle steamer was burned on the Big Sandy River between Kentucky and West Virginia. (This may be the same shipwreck as the 5 November shipwreck of a steamer named Fawn).
Godemoder	Norway	The brig was driven ashore near Jershöft, Prussia.
Hawk Eye	United Kingdom	The ship was damaged by fire at Valparaíso, Chile.
Monica	United Kingdom	The ship ran aground in the Rock Channel. She was on a voyage from Quebec City, Province of Canada, British North America to Liverpool, Lancashire. She was refloated and towed in to Liverpool.
Muta	United Kingdom	The schooner departed from Liverpool for Glasgow, Renfrewshire. No further trace, presumed foundered with the loss of all hands.
USS Tulip	United States Navy	The gunboat suffered a boiler explosion and sank in the Potomac River off Piney Point, Maryland. The explosion killed 49 men. The tug Hudson (United States Army) rescued ten survivors, two of whom later died of their injuries.

== 12 November ==
List of shipwrecks: 12 November 1864
Ship	State	Description
Ann Proud	United Kingdom	The ship departed from Danzig for London. No further trace, presumed foundered with the loss of all hands.
Flensburg	Denmark	The barque was driven ashore at Beachy Head, Sussex, United Kingdom.
Jupiter	United Kingdom	The ship ran aground and was damaged at Constantinople, Ottoman Empire. She was on a voyage from Constanţa to Constantinople. She was refloated and towed in to Constantinople.
Kate Prince	United States	American Civil War: The 1,100-ton clipper, carrying a cargo of coal, was captured and burned in the North Atlantic Ocean by the merchant raider CSS Shenandoah (Confederate States Navy).
Kelvin, and Onward	(United Kingdom of Great Britain and Ireland) British North America; United Kingdom	The full-rigged ship Kelvin collided with Onward off the Giants Causeway, County Antrim. Both vessels were on a voyage from Quebec City, Province of Canada to the River Clyde and both were severely damaged. Kelvin was towed in to the Belfast Lough by the steamship Rose (United Kingdom). Onward was towed in to the Belfast Lough by Shamrock (United Kingdom).
Scandinavian	United Kingdom	The brig was driven ashore near Jershöft, Prussia.
Vigilant	United Kingdom	The steamship was driven ashore near Jershöft.
Stand	(United Kingdom of Great Britain and Ireland)	The schooner was wrecked off Arichat, Nova Scotia. Her crew were rescued. She was on a voyage from Quebec City, Province of Canada to Halifax, Nova Scotia.

== 13 November ==
List of shipwrecks: 13 November 1864
Ship	State	Description
Lizzie M. Stacey	United States	American Civil War: The 140-ton schooner was captured and burned in the North Atlantic Ocean by the merchant raider CSS Shenandoah (Confederate States Navy).
Ville de Lyons	France	The ship caught fire at Alexandria, Egypt and was scuttled.

== 14 November ==
List of shipwrecks: 14 November 1864
Ship	State	Description
Carrier Dove	United Kingdom	The schooner foundered off Long Point, Nova Scotia, British North America. Her crew were rescued.
Druid	United Kingdom	The ship was wrecked on the Emma Bank, off Maranhão, Brazil with the loss of two of her crew. She was on a voyage from Cardiff, Glamorgan to Maranhão.
Emma	United Kingdom	The ship was driven ashore on the east coast of "Acland". She was on a voyage from Pori, Grand Duchy of Finland to Rio de Janeiro, Brazil.
Mymphe	France	The ship was driven ashore on "Hogande Salvoors". She was on a voyage from Riga, Russian Empire to Dunkirk, Nord.

== 15 November ==
List of shipwrecks: 15 November 1864
Ship	State	Description
Isis	Norway	The schooner was abandoned in the North Sea off St Abbs Head, Berwickshire, United Kingdom. Her crew were rescued. She was on a voyage from Newcastle upon Tyne, Northumberland, United Kingdom to Christiania.
San Nicolo	Kingdom of Lombardy–Venetia	The ship was wrecked on the Primero Bank. She was on a voyage from the Levant to Trieste.

== 16 November ==
List of shipwrecks: 16 November 1864
Ship	State	Description
Alma	United Kingdom	The ship foundered. She was on a voyage from Cádiz, Spain to Saint Petersburg, Russia.
Andrea Mignano	Flag unknown	The ship departed from Gibraltar for a British port. No further trace, presumed foundered with the loss of all hands.
Charlotta	Prussia	The full-rigged ship was abandoned in the Atlantic Ocean. Her thirteen crew were rescued by the barque Empress (United Kingdom). Charlotta was on a voyage from Quebec City, Province of Canada, British North America to Memel.
Ellen	United Kingdom	The pilot boat foundered off Lundy Island, Devon with the loss of all hands.
Euterpe	United Kingdom	The ship was damaged by fire at Liverpool, Lancashire.
Isabella and Ann	United Kingdom	The barque foundered 30 nautical miles (56 km) west of Start Point, Devon. Her eight crew were rescued by the barque Arion (Russia or Grand Duchy of Finland). She was on a voyage from South Shields, County Durham to Alexandria, Egypt
Sea Queen	United Kingdom	The steamship ran aground north of Cuxhaven. She was on a voyage from Hartlepool, County Durham to Hamburg. She was refloated and taken in to Hamburg.

== 17 November ==
List of shipwrecks: 17 November 1864
Ship	State	Description
Agnes Davidson	United Kingdom	The schooner departed from Danzig for Dundee, Forfarshire. No further trace, presumed foundered with the loss of all hands.
Belinda	(United Kingdom of Great Britain and Ireland) Jersey	The brigantine sprang a leak in the English Channel off Beachy Head, Sussex. She was consequently beached at Dungeness, Kent with the loss of two lives. She was on a voyage from London to Jersey.
Betsey Hall	United Kingdom	The ship sank off Seaham, County Durham. Her crew were rescued. She was on a voyage from Sunderland, County Durham to Fécamp, Seine-Inférieure, France.
Dolphin	United Kingdom	The oyster boat foundered off Garlieston, Wigtownshire with the loss of all three crew.
Earl of Elgin	United Kingdom	The ship ran aground. She was on a voyage from Moulmein, Burma to a British port. She was refloated and towed in to Natmoo, Burma.
Elbe	United Kingdom	The brig was driven ashore at Hubberstone Pill, Pembrokeshire. She was on a voyage from Demerara, British Guiana to Newcastle upon Tyne, Northumberland.
Euphemia	United Kingdom	The schooner was wrecked on a reef off the coast of Fife. Her four crew were rescued by a coble. She was on a voyage from Aberdeen to East Wemyss, Fife.
Hectorine	United Kingdom	The schooner was driven ashore and wrecked at Llangennith, Glamorgan. Her crew survived. She was on a voyage from Cork to Llanelly, Glamorgan.
Mary	United Kingdom	The schooner was destroyed by fire at Jura, Inner Hebrides. She was on a voyage from Larne, County Antrim to Glasgow, Renfrewshire.
Parrsborough	United Kingdom	The brig foundered in Killala Bay.
Rhoda	United Kingdom	The steamship departed from Liverpool for Barcelona, Spain. No further trace, presumed foundered with the loss of all fourteen crew.
Rosetta	United Kingdom	The brig struck the pier at South Shields, County Durham and was consequently beached. She was on a voyage from Seaham to South Shields.
Satira	United Kingdom	The ship ran aground on Taylor's Bank, in Liverpool Bay. She was on a voyage from Falmouth, Cornwall to Runcorn, Cheshire. She was refloated and taken in to Liverpool, Lancashire.
Sarah	United Kingdom	The brigantine was driven ashore and wrecked in Tramore Bay. She was on a voyage from Waterford to Cardiff, Glamorgan.
Velise	United Kingdom	The ship ran aground off Östergarn, Sweden and sank. Her crew were rescued. She was on a voyage from Visby, Sweden to Saint-Nazaire, Loire-Inférieure, France.
Wind	United Kingdom	The brig was driven ashore in Freshwater Bay, Pembrokeshire. Her crew were rescued.
No. 17	United Kingdom	The pilot boat foundered off Lundy Island, Devon with the loss of all hands.

== 18 November ==
List of shipwrecks: 18 November 1864
Ship	State	Description
Active	United Kingdom	The Mersey Flat foundered in the Irish Sea 15 nautical miles (28 km) off the Isle of Man with the loss of one of her three crew. Survivors were rescued by the fishing smack Perseverance (United Kingdom). Active was on a voyage from Chester, Cheshire to the Isle of Man.
Active	United Kingdom	The sloop was abandoned off the coast of Pembrokeshire. Her three crew were rescued by the Tenby Lifeboat. Active was subsequently taken in to Tenby by a fishing smack.
Agenoria	United Kingdom	The schooner was driven ashore between Swansea and the Mumbles, Glamorgan.
Alice	United Kingdom	The fishing boat was driven ashore at Porthdinllaen, Caernarfonshire. Her crew were rescued.
Amphytrite	United Kingdom	The schooner collided with the steamship Queen (United Kingdom) at Ilfracombe, Devon and was abandoned by her crew. They were rescued by Queen, which towed Amphytrite in to Ilfracombe in a severely damaged condition.
Arabia, Edward and Margaret, Ellen Edwards, and Killala Lass	United Kingdom	Arabia was driven in to the schooners Edward and Margaret and Ellen Edwards at Milford Haven, Pembrokeshire. Both schooners sank. She then drove into the schooner Killala Lass, which was left in a sinking condition. Arabia then drove ashore. She had also collided with Bridget, Ontario, Progress, Puebla and Tempest (all United Kingdom). Arabia was on a voyage from Quebec City. Province of Canada, British North America to Milford Haven. She was refloated on 27 November.
Biene	Russia	The brigantine foundered in the Atlantic Ocean. Her crew were rescued by Volunteer (United Kingdom). Biene was on a voyage from Lisbon, Portugal to Kristiandstad, Sweden.
Billow	United Kingdom	The schooner foundered in the Bristol Channel with the loss of all hands. She was on a voyage from Llanelly, Glamorgan to Hayle, Cornwall.
Chimera	United Kingdom	The brig-rigged steamship was wrecked on the Horse Bank, off Southport, Lancashire with the loss of fourteen of the fifteen people on board. The survivor was rescued by the Lytham St Annes Lifeboat. She was on a voyage from Sierra Leone to Liverpool, Lancashire.
Cottager	United Kingdom	The brigantine sprang a leak and was run ashore at Rossglass, County Down.
David and Martha	United Kingdom	The ship was wrecked on the Saunton Sands, Devon with the loss of all hands.
Desirée	France	The smack was driven ashore in Oxwich Bay, Glamorgan, United Kingdom. Her five crew were rescued. She was on a voyage from Havre de Grâce, Seine-Inférieure, to Swansea, Glamorgan.
Ellen Fair	United Kingdom	The schooner foundered in the Bristol Channel with the Loss of all hands. She was on a voyage from Neath, Glamorgan to Portreath, Cornwall.
Far West	United Kingdom	The ship ran aground off Penarth, Glamorgan. Her 22 crew were rescued by the Penarth Lifeboat. She was on a voyage from Callao, Peru to Newport, Monmouthshire. She was refloated with the assistance of some tugs.
Friendship	United Kingdom	The full-rigged ship was abandoned in the North Sea 90 nautical miles (170 km) north west of Heligoland. Her crew were rescued. She was on a voyage from South Shields, County Durham to Hamburg.
George Stephenson	United Kingdom	The barque was wrecked off Corton, Suffolk with the loss of all hands. She may have collided with the barque William (United Kingdom).
Harmony	United Kingdom	The full-rigged ship was driven ashore at Pembroke. She was on a voyage from Quebec City to Gloucester.
Heroine	United Kingdom	The ship was driven ashore and wrecked at Newquay, Cornwall. Her five crew were rescued by the Newquay Lifeboat. She was on a voyage from a Welsh port to Devoran, Cornwall.
Hurry Puddemsey	United Kingdom	The ship was driven against the quayside and damaged at Liverpool. She was on a voyage from Liverpool to Singapore, Straits Settlements. She was taken in to Liverpool for repairs.
Industry	United Kingdom	The fishing boat was driven ashore at Porthdinllaen. Her crew were rescued.
John and Catherine	United Kingdom	The ship was driven ashore and wrecked at Ilfracombe. Her crew had been taken off by a gig.
J. S. T.	United Kingdom	The schooner foundered in the Bristol Channel with the loss of all hands. She was on a voyage from Llanelly to Bremen.
Lancaster No. 4	United States	The 218-ton sidewheel paddle steamer struck a snag and sank in the Mississippi River below Portland, Missouri.
Lykken	Prussia	The ship was driven ashore. She was on a voyage from Stolpemünde to Grimsby, Lincolnshire, United Kingdom.
Mayflower	United Kingdom	The schooner was driven ashore and wrecked at St Davids, Pembrokeshire.
Meridian	United Kingdom	The brigantine ran aground on the North Tail Ridge, off Barnstaple, Devon. The crew of the Appledore Lifeboat refused to attend. Nevertheless, her crew were eventually rescued.
Reporter	United Kingdom	The ship was driven ashore on Oyster Island, County Sligo. She was refloated the next day.
Resolution	United Kingdom	The schooner foundered off Maughold Head, Isle of Man with the loss of all three crew. Mona's Queen ( (United Kingdom of Great Britain and Ireland) Isle of Man) was unable to rescued them.
Rook	United Kingdom	The schooner was driven ashore at Milnerston, County Down. She was on a voyage from Liverpool to Newry, County Antrim.
Sailor's Bride	United Kingdom	The barque ran aground on the India Bank, in Wicklow Bay. Her crew were rescued by the brig Cordelia (United Kingdom). Sailor's Bride was on a voyage from Troon, Ayrshire to Malta.
Sligo	United Kingdom	The ship was driven ashore at Sligo.
Sydney Trader	United Kingdom	The schooner was abandoned off the coast of Pembrokeshire. Her crew were rescued by a dredge boat.
The Lady of the Lake	United Kingdom	The vessel foundered in Oxwich Bay.
Undine	United Kingdom	The brig foundered off Caldy Island, Pembrokeshire. Her crew were rescued.
Union	United Kingdom	The brig foundered off the coast of Pembrokeshire. Her crew were rescued by the fishing smack Breeze (United Kingdom).
William and Maria	(United Kingdom of Great Britain and Ireland) Jersey	The fishing boat was driven ashore at Porthdinllaen. Her crew were rescued.

== 19 November ==
List of shipwrecks: 19 November 1864
Ship	State	Description
Acasco	Flag unknown	The schooner collided with Witch of the Seas (United Kingdom) and was beached at "Mossil", Spain. She was on a voyage from Rio de Janeiro, Brazil to Kronstadt, Russia. She was refloated and taken in to Málaga, Spain for repairs.
Augusta	United Kingdom	The ship was wrecked on the Lemon and Ower Sand. Her crew were rescued. She was on a voyage from the Danube to Alloa, Clackmannanshire.
Lady Eliott	United Kingdom	The ship sank at Padstow, Cornwall with the loss of all five crew. She was on a voyage from Neath, Glamorgan to plymouth, Devon.
Nebraska	United Kingdom	The brig was driven ashore on the Mull of Galloway. Her crew were rescued. She was on a voyage from Llanelly, Glamorgan to the Clyde.
Prince Humbert	Portugal	The ship was abandoned at sea. Her crew were rescued by the brig Lodnea (Norway) and/or by Svanen (Sweden). Prince Humbert was on a voyage from Porto to Newcastle upon Tyne, Northumberland, United Kingdom.
Sappho	United Kingdom	The herring boat departed from Howth, County Dublin. No further trace, presumed foundered with the loss of all six crew.
Unity	United Kingdom	The ship sprang a leak and was run ashore at Turnbull Point, Wigtownshire. She was on a voyage from Troon, Ayrshire to Belfast, County Antrim.
Zito	Italy	The barque foundered off Cape St. Vincent, Portugal. Her crew were rescued by the British steamship Italian. Zito was on a voyage from Genoa to Swansea, Glamorgan.

== 20 November ==
List of shipwrecks: 20 November 1864
Ship	State	Description
Ansea	United Kingdom	The schooner was driven ashore and wrecked at Sandy Haven, Pembrokeshire. She was on a voyage from Newport, Monmouthshire t Balbriggan, County Dublin.
England	United Kingdom	The barque was abandoned off the coast of County Cork. Her crew were rescued by the steamship RMS Canada (United Kingdom). England was on a voyage from Quebec City, Province of Canada, British North America to Newcastle upon Tyne, Northumberland.
Mary L. Sutton	United States	The clipper was wrecked in the Line Islands. Her crew survived.
Telegraph	United Kingdom	The tug sank at North Shields, Northumberland. She was refloated.

== 21 November ==
List of shipwrecks: 21 November 1864
Ship	State	Description
Constantia	United Kingdom	The barque was wrecked on the Wittsand, in the North Sea. She was on a voyage from Bahia, Brazil to Bremen.
Najaden	United Kingdom	The ship was abandoned in the South Atlantic.

== 22 November ==
List of shipwrecks: 22 November 1864
Ship	State	Description
Danish Queen	United Kingdom	The steamship ran aground on the Whittsand, in the North Sea. She was on a voyage from Hartlepool, County Durham to Hamburg. She was refloated and taken in to Hamburg in a leaky condition.
Horizon	United Kingdom	The ship was abandoned in the Atlantic Ocean 100 nautical miles (190 km) west of the Isles of Scilly. Her crew were rescued by a Dutch schooner. She was on a voyage from Calcutta, India to London.
Katie	United States	The 180-ton sternwheel paddle steamer sank in the Ohio River at Diamond Island with the loss of one life nine minutes after colliding with Des Moines (flag unknown).
Robin Hood	United Kingdom	The ship collided with Spirit of the Ocean (United Kingdom) and sank in the English Channel 3 nautical miles (5.6 km) west of Dungeness, Kent. Her crew took to three boats; those in two of the boats were rescued by the tug Conqueror (United Kingdom). Seven crew in the third boat reached Dover. Robin Hood was on a voyage from London to Hong Kong.
Robert and Charlotte	United Kingdom	The ship was run into by the steamship Volunteer and sank in the River Yare at Great Yarmouth, Norfolk. She had been refloated by 1 December.
Sidonia	Prussia	The barque foundered off Banff, Aberdeenshire with the loss of a crew member. Survivors were rescued by the schooner Lord Redhaven (United Kingdom). Sidona was on a voyage from South Shields, County Durham, United Kingdom to Swinemünde.
Strand	United Kingdom	The ship was driven ashore and wrecked at Thorntonloch, Lothian. Her four crew were rescued by rocket apparatus and a coble. She was on a voyage from South Shields to St. Andrews, Fife.

== 23 November ==
List of shipwrecks: 23 November 1864
Ship	State	Description
Anne Kerstine	Denmark	The ship ran aground on the Cork Sand, in the North Sea off the coast of Essex, United Kingdom. She was on a voyage from Gothenburg, Sweden to Calais, France. She was refloated with the assistance of two smacks and assisted in to Harwich, Essex.
Balkan	Flag unknown	The ship was wrecked at "Alverdo", Mexico.
Capella	Hamburg	The galiot was driven ashore at Corton, Suffolk, United Kingdom. Her six crew were rescued by rocket apparatus. She was on a voyage from Hamburg to Bruges, West Flanders, Belgium.
Damsel	United Kingdom	The sloop collided with the brig Monarch ( (United Kingdom of Great Britain and Ireland) Jersey) off Lowestoft, Suffolk. She was towed in to Lowestoft, where she sank. She was on a voyage from Hull, Yorkshire to Ipswich, Suffolk.
Lady Anne	United Kingdom	The schooner was driven ashore at Gorleston, Suffolk with the loss of a crew member. Survivors were rescued by rocket apparatus. She was on a voyage from Newcastle upon Tyne, Northumberland to Rochester, Kent.
Light of the Harem	United Kingdom	The schooner was driven ashore and broke her back at Corton. Her seven crew were rescued by rocket apparatus. She was on a voyage from Seaham, County Durham to London or Rochester. She was refloated on 27 November and taken in to Great Yarmouth, Norfolk.
Sea Serpent	United Kingdom	The barque was driven ashore at Great Yarmouth. Her crew were rescued by the Great Yarmouth Lifeboat or by rocket Apparatus. Severely hogged, she was dismantled in situ.
Sultana	United Kingdom	The schooner was driven ashore at Corton. Her crew were rescued by rocket apparatus. She was on a voyage from Sunderland, County Durham to Abbeville, Somme. She was refloated on 29 November and taken in to Great Yarmouth in a waterlogged condition.
Unnamed	United Kingdom	The Thames barge sank off Leysdown, Isle of Sheppey, Kent with the loss of eight of the ten people on board. Survivors were rescued by the Coast Guard. She was on a voyage from London to Leysdown.
Unnamed	Norway	The schooner was wrecked at Haroldswick, Shetland Islands, United Kingdom. Her crew were rescued.

== 24 November ==
List of shipwrecks: 24 November 1864
Ship	State	Description
Actif	France	The schooner was driven ashore at Corton, Suffolk, United Kingdom. She was on a voyage from Sunderland, County Durham, United Kingdom to Nantes, Loire-Inférieure. She was refloated on 27 November.
Ashmore	United Kingdom	The barque foundered 7 nautical miles (13 km) off Cape Sarawasaki, Japan. Her crew survived.
Betsey	United Kingdom	The brig ran aground on the Goodwin Sands, Kent. She was on a voyage from Boulogne, Pas-de-Calais, France to Sunderland. She was refloated and resumed her voyage, but consequently put in to Lowestoft, Suffolk in a leaky condition.
Capella	Netherlands	The galiot was driven ashore and wrecked at Gorleston, Suffolk. Her six crew were rescued by rocket apparatus. She was on a voyage from Hamburg to Buenos Aires, Argentina.
Constance	United Kingdom	The lifeboat was severely damaged attempting to rescued the crew of the schooner Friendship (United Kingdom) at Tynemouth, Northumberland. She put in to Tynemouth and was subsequently towed to North Shields, Northumberland by the lifeboat William Wake (United Kingdom).
Cunliffe	United Kingdom	The sloop was driven ashore and wrecked at Corton. She was refloated on 27 November.
Dalhousie	United Kingdom	The steamship was wrecked on the Abertay Sands, off the mouth of the River Tay with the loss of all 24 people on board. She was on a voyage from Newcastle upon Tyne, Northumberland to Dundee, Forfarshire.
David and John	United Kingdom	The schooner foundered off the mouth of the River Tay. Her crew were rescued by the tug Samson (United Kingdom).
Devonport	United Kingdom	The schooner was driven ashore at Kingsdown, Kent. Her five crew were rescued. She was on a voyage from South Shields, County Durham to Naples, Italy. She was refloated and put in to Lowestoft in a leaky condition.
Diligence	United Kingdom	The schooner was driven ashore 3 nautical miles (5.6 km) north of Hartlepool, County Durham. She was on a voyage from Le Tréport, Seine-Inférieure, France to Sunderland. She was refloated and towed in to Sunderland.
Elizabeth	(United Kingdom of Great Britain and Ireland) New Zealand	The schooner's anchor chain parted while she was moored at Okains Bay, Banks Peninsula, and was driven on shore by a heavy sea.
Elizabeth Young	United Kingdom	The ship struck the Longscar Rocks, in the North Sea off the coast of Northumberland. She was on a voyage from Danzig to Newcastle upon Tyne. She put in to Hartlepool in a waterlogged condition.
Fernand	France	The ship was driven ashore at Blakeney, Norfolk, United Kingdom. Her crew were rescued. She was on a voyage from South Shields to Saint-Malo, Ille-et-Vilaine.
Friendship	United Kingdom	The schooner was driven ashore and wrecked at Tynemouth with the loss of all six crew and two of the four crew of the Tynemouth Lifeboat Constance (United Kingdom), who had been left on that vessel when the lifeboat was damaged and had to abandon the rescue attempt.
Haselman, and Margaret	United Kingdom	The schooner Haselman collided with the brig Margaret collided with each other and were both driven ashore and sank at Fraserburgh, Aberdeenshire. They were on a voyage from Sunderland to Fraserburgh. Margaret was refloated on 30 November and taken in to Fraserburgh.
Integrity	United Kingdom	The fishing lugger was driven ashore at Corton. Her crew were rescued.
Iwanowa	Unknown	The full-rigged ship was lost off Cape Flattery on the coast of Washington Territory.
Joseph and Elizabeth	United Kingdom	The ship ran aground on the Bawdsey Sand, in the North Sea off the coast of Suffolk. She was on a voyage from Newcastle upon Tyne to London. She was refloated and put in to Lowestoft.
Juniata	United Kingdom	The collier, a brig, was wrecked on the Cork Sand, in the North Sea off the coast of Essex with the loss of two of her six crew. Survivors were rescued by Paragon and Queen Victoria (both United Kingdom).
Leeds	United Kingdom	The schooner was driven ashore at Theddlethorpe, Lincolnshire. She was on a voyage from London to Hull, Yorkshire.
Light of the Harem	United Kingdom	The schooner was driven ashore and broke her back at Corton. Her seven crew were rescued by rocket apparatus.
Lily	United Kingdom	The ship ran aground on the Newcombe Sand, in the North Sea off the coast of Suffolk. She was refloated with assistance from the tug Rainbow (United Kingdom).
Lord Harley	United Kingdom	The ship was driven ashore and wrecked at Tynemouth. Survivors were rescued by rocket apparatus.
Louisa	Flag unknown	American Civil War, Union blockade: The schooner was chased ashore by the gunboat USS Chocura (United States Navy) on the bar off the San Bernard River off the coast of Texas Confederate States of America, where a heavy gale completely destroyed her before Union forces could board her.
Louis XIV	France	The barque was driven ashore and wrecked at Dungeness, Kent, United Kingdom. All fifteen people on board were rescued by the Dungeness Lifeboat. She was on a voyage from Dunkirk, Nord to Liverpool, Lancashire, United Kingdom.
Martin Luther	United Kingdom	The brig was driven against the pier at South Shields and wrecked with the loss of all hands.
New York	Hamburg	The ship foundered in the Dogger Bank. Her crew were rescued by Prinz Adalbert (Prussia). New York was on a voyage from Sunderland to New York, United States.
Ork	Flag unknown	The vessel was wrecked on the Umpqua River Bar at the mouth of the Umpqua River off the coast of Oregon, United States.
Sea Serpent	United Kingdom	The barque was driven ashore at Great Yarmouth, Norfolk with the loss of one of her fourteen crew. Survivors were rescued by the Great Yarmouth Lifeboat and the Coast Guard using rocket apparatus. She was on a voyage from South Shields, County Durham to Jamaica.
Shrapnel	United States Army	The steamer sank in a canal in Virginia while on her way to Norfolk, Confederate States of America, for repairs.
Silistria	United Kingdom	The brig was driven ashore at Aldeburgh, Suffolk and was abandoned by her crew. She was on a voyage from Sunderland to London. She was refloated by the crew of the smack Nautilus (United Kingdom) and taken in to Lowestoft in a waterlogged condition.
Stanley	United Kingdom	The steamship was wrecked on the Black Middens, off Tynemouth with the loss of 26 of the 61 people on board. Survivors were rescued by the Coast Guard using rocket apparatus. She was on a voyage from Aberdeen to London.
Sultana	United Kingdom	The schooner was driven ashore at Gorleston. Her crew were rescued by rocket apparatus. She was on a voyage from Sunderland, County Durham to a French port.
William Hutt	United Kingdom	The steamship foundered in the North Sea off Great Yarmouth with the loss of seventeen of her eighteen crew. The survivor was rescued by the smack Telegraph (United Kingdom). William Hutt was on a voyage from Sunderland to London.
Unnamed	Norway	The schooner was driven ashore and scuttled at Dysart, Fife, United Kingdom.

== 25 November ==
List of shipwrecks: 25 November 1864
Ship	State	Description
Anne Davies	United Kingdom	The schooner was driven ashore at Morfa Bychan, Caernarfonshire. She was refloated with assistance from the tugboat Wave of Life (United Kingdom) and towed in to Portmadoc.
Ardwell	United Kingdom	The collier, a brig, sank at South Shields, County Durham. Her crew were rescued.
Argo	United Kingdom	The schooner was wrecked on the Corton Sands, in the North Sea off the coast of Suffolk with the loss of her captain. Five survivors were rescued by the barque Medora (United Kingdom). Argo was on a voyage from Hartlepool, County Durham to London.
Atterdag	Norway	The brig was wrecked at Macduff, Aberdeenshire, United Kingdom.
Bird	United Kingdom	The ship was wrecked in Sandown Bay. Her crew were rescued. She was on a voyage from Newport, Isle of Wight to Sandown, Isle of Wight.
Breeze	United Kingdom	The schooner was driven ashore at Abersoch, Caernarfonshire. She was refloated on 1 December and taken in to Pwllheli for repairs.
Elida	Norway	The schooner was wrecked near Aith, Shetland Islands, United Kingdom with the loss of all five crew.
Eliza and Jane	United Kingdom	The brig was driven ashore near Trelleborg, Sweden. She was on a voyage from Danzig to London. She was refloated on 23 December and taken in to Copenhagen, Denmark.
Eustace	United Kingdom	The steamship ran aground on the Longsand, in the North Sea off the coast of Essex. She was on a voyage from London to Constantinople, Ottoman Empire. She was refloated and put in to Harwich, Essex.
Francis Skiddy	United States	The 1,183- or 1,235-ton sidewheel paddle steamer was stranded on a reef in the Hudson River four miles (6.4 km) south of Albany, New York.
Hosannah	Netherlands	The fishing boat was discovered abandoned off the coast of Norfolk. Crew presumed drowned.
Hydaspes	France	The steamship was wrecked on the Pan Reef. Her crew were rescued. She was on a voyage from Batavia, Netherlands East Indies to Singapore, Straits Settlements.
Immanuel	United Kingdom	The ship was driven ashore east of Nes, Ameland, Friesland, Netherlands. Her crew were rescued by the Nes Lifeboat. She was on a voyage from Middlesbrough, Yorkshire to Norden, Kingdom of Hanover. Immanuel subsequently sank.
Janet	United Kingdom	The ship foundered in the North Sea. She was on a voyage from Sunderland, County Durham to Hamburg.
John	United Kingdom	The ship was driven ashore and wrecked at Winterton-on-Sea, Norfolk. Her crew were rescued by the Winterton Lifeboat. She was on a voyage from West Hartlepool, County Durham to London.
L and R Smith	United States	Carrying a cargo of coal, the schooner sank in the Atlantic Ocean 21 nautical miles (39 km) east of Cape Henry, Virginia, Confederate States of America.
Maria	United Kingdom	The ship was wrecked near Berck, Pas-de-Calais, France. Her crew were rescued. She was on a voyage from Veracruz, Mexico to London.
Mary	United Kingdom	The sloop was driven ashore and wrecked 2 nautical miles (3.7 km) south of Troon, Ayrshire. Her crew were rescued. She was on a voyage from Belfast, County Antrim to Troon.
Marys	United Kingdom	The sloop was driven ashore at Irvine, Ayrshire. Her crew were rescued.
Matilda	United Kingdom	The barque was abandoned in the Atlantic Ocean. Her crew were rescued by Standard (United Kingdom). Matilda was on a voyage from Liverpool to Malta.
Peace	United Kingdom	The ship was wrecked in Sandown Bay. Her crew were rescued.
Three Sisters	United Kingdom	The ship was wrecked in Sandown Bay. Her crew were rescued.
Nuestra Señora del Triunfo	Spanish Navy	The Lealtad-class screw frigate was destroyed by fire in the Chincha Islands off Pisco, Peru.
Vitus	Sweden	The schooner foundered in the North Sea (56°10′N 1°57′E). Her crew were rescued by the brig Messenger (United Kingdom). Vitus was on a voyage from London to Stockholm.
William L. Ewing	United States	The 335-ton sidewheel paddle steamer was stranded on the Mississippi River at St. Louis, Missouri.
Wont Roy	Netherlands	The fishing boat foundered off Smith's Knoll, in the North Sea off the coast of Norfolk with the loss of all hands.
Unnamed	United Kingdom	The brig was driven ashore at South Shields.
Unnamed	Flag unknown	The ship was wrecked at Gulberwick, Shetland Islands. Another vessel may also have been wrecked at the same time.

== 26 November ==
List of shipwrecks: 26 November 1864
Ship	State	Description
Dasher	United Kingdom	The ship ran aground on the Girdler Sand, in the North Sea off the coast of Suffolk. She was on a voyage from London to "Ambrook". She was refloated and taken in to Ramsgate, Kent in a leaky condition.
Deptford Packet	United Kingdom	The ship ran aground on the Black Middens, in the North Sea off the coast of County Durham. She was refloated and taken in to South Shields.
Emily	United Kingdom	The barque was driven ashore and wrecked at Östergarn, Sweden. Her crew were rescued. She was on a voyage from Kronstadt, Russia to London.
Fah Kee	China	The brig capsized in the South China Sea. Her crew survived. She was on a voyage from Bangkok, Siam to Hong Kong.
Follene	Kingdom of Hanover	The galiot collide with the full-rigged ship Norwegian (Norway) and was abandoned with the loss of one of her four crew. Survivors were rescued by Norwegian. Follene was on a voyage from Burntisland, Fife, United Kingdom to Hamburg.
James	United Kingdom	The brig foundered in the North Sea. Her crew were rescued. She was on a voyage from Sunderland, County Durham to Hamburg.
John	United Kingdom	The ship struck the Culloded Rock, off Portmahomack, Ross-shire and was abandoned. She was taken in to Skudeneshavn, Norway in a derelict condition on 2 December.
Julia	United Kingdom	The schooner was abandoned in the North Sea off Whitby, Yorkshire. Her crew were rescued by the steamship Morna (United Kingdom), which towed her in to Hartlepool, County Durham, where she was beached.
Marquis of Anglesey	United Kingdom	The smack was driven ashore at New Brighton, Cheshire. She was refloated with assistance from the tug Relier (United Kingdom).
Mentor	Stralsund	The ship was wrecked on the Jadder, in the Baltic Sea with the loss of all but two of her crew. She was on a voyage from Newcastle upon Tyne, Northumberland, United Kingdom to Stralsund.
Minerva	United Kingdom	The steamship ran aground in the River Tyne. She was on a voyage from Cádiz, Spain to Newcastle upon Tyne. She was refloated.
Olivia	United Kingdom	The schooner ran aground on the Cutler Sand, in the North Sea off the coast of Suffolk. She was on a voyage from Sunderland, County Durham to London. She was refloated with assistance and taken in to Harwich, Essex.
Raven	United Kingdom	The ship was wrecked on the Sandhammer, in the Baltic Sea. Her crew were rescued. She was on a voyage from Windau, Courland Governorate to Lowestoft, Suffolk.
Rhine	United Kingdom	The brig foundered in the North Sea. Her crew were rescued. She was on a voyage from Sunderland to Hamburg.
Sagamore	Flag unknown	Carrying a cargo of granite and cobbles, the schooner foundered in a storm in the Pacific Ocean off the coast of California four nautical miles (7.4 km) above Point Pinole.
Salisbury	United Kingdom	The ship foundered in the North Sea 30 nautical miles (56 km) south by east of Tynemouth Castle, Northumberland. Her crew were rescued by George A. Holt ( (United Kingdom of Great Britain and Ireland) British North America). Salisbury was on a voyage from Hamburg to Sunderland.
Sarah	United Kingdom	The ship was wrecked in the Farne Islands, Northumberland with the loss of all but one of her crew.
Southern Light	(United Kingdom of Great Britain and Ireland) New South Wales	The ship foundered in Broken Bay with the loss of all hands. She was on a voyage from Sydney to Brisbane Water.
Susan	United Kingdom	The schooner was driven ashore in the Belfast Lough. She was on a voyage from Glasgow, Renfrewshire to Dublin.
Swift	United Kingdom	The schooner was driven ashore by ice at Bolderāja, Russia.
Tartar	United Kingdom	The steamship foundered in the North Sea with the loss of her captain. Survivors were rescued by a Dutch galiot. She was on a voyage from Gävle, Sweden to Hull, Yorkshire.
Trial	United Kingdom	The schooner was driven ashore and wrecked at Breaksea Point, Glamorgan.
William Walker	United Kingdom	The brig was wrecked on the Barber Sand or the Patch Sand, in the North Sea off the coast of Norfolk. Her crew were rescued. She was on a voyage from Sunderland to London.

== 27 November ==
List of shipwrecks: 27 November 1864
Ship	State	Description
Adolf	Sweden	The brig was driven ashore on the east coast of Öland. She was on voyage from Gävle to Grimsby, Lincolnshire, United Kingdom. She was later refloated and taken in to Fredrikshavn, Denmark, where she arrived on 31 December.
Adolphine	Sweden	The ship was driven ashore on Skagen, Denmark. She was on a voyage from Malmö to Hull, Yorkshire, United Kingdom. She was later refloated and taken in to Arendal, Norway, where she arrived on 3 December.
Dinapadog	Denmark	The schooner was driven ashore and wrecked in Sandwick Bay, Shetland Islands, United Kingdom. She was on a voyage from Iceland to Copenhagen.
Emily Anne	(United Kingdom of Great Britain and Ireland) New South Wales	The schooner ran aground, capsized and sank at the mouth of the Manning River with the loss of all hands. She was on a voyage from Sydney to the Manning River.
Expert	United Kingdom	The brig ran aground on the Herd Sand, in the North Sea off the coast of County Durham, and sank.
Fidelio	Prussia	The ship was wrecked on "Ross Island", Shetland Islands. Her crew were rescued. She was on a voyage from Newcastle upon Tyne, Northumberland, United Kingdom to Wolgast.
Flying Fish	(United Kingdom of Great Britain and Ireland) New South Wales	The schooner ran aground at the mouth of the Manning River and was wrecked with the loss of two of her crew. She was on a voyage from Sydney to the Manning River.
Greyhound	United States	American Civil War: The 380-, 400-, or 900-ton sidewheel paddle steamer, serving as headquarters ship for Major General Benjamin Butler, was destroyed by an explosion and fire on the James River in Virginia 5 to 6 nautical miles (9 to 11 km) below Bermuda Hundred. Union forces assessed the cause of the explosion as a "coal torpedo" – a charge of gunpowder disguised as a lump of coal – planted by Confederate saboteurs. All aboard, including Butler, Rear Admiral David Dixon Porter, and Major General Robert C. Schenk, survived, but horses belonging to Butler and his staff died in the sinking.
Johanna	Stettin	The ship foundered in the North Sea. Her crew were rescued by Susannah Dixon (United Kingdom).
Maria	United Kingdom	The ship was driven ashore at Dornoch, Sutherland. She was on a voyage from Macduff, Aberdeenshire to London.
Mary	(United Kingdom of Great Britain and Ireland) New South Wales	The ship ran aground at the mouth of the Manning River.
Olive Branch	United Kingdom	The ship was driven ashore at Pridmouth, Cornwall. She was refloated on 1 December and taken in to Fowey, Cornwall.
Sarah	United Kingdom	The schooner was wrecked at Tain, Ross-shire with the loss of all but one of her crew. She was on a voyage from Newcastle upon Tyne to Tain.
Teviotdale	United Kingdom	The ship ran aground in St Roques Channel. She was on a voyage from Stockholm, Sweden to Australia.

== 28 November ==
List of shipwrecks: 28 November 1864
Ship	State	Description
Africa	Prussia	The brig ran aground and sank off Dundalk, County Louth, United Kingdom. She was refloated on 1 January 1865.
Alemania	United Kingdom	The steamship ran aground on the Mezuno Rapid and was damaged. She was refloated and placed under repair.
Amy Robsart	United Kingdom	The barque ran aground on the Black Middens, in the North Sea off the coast of Northumberland and was wrecked. Her crew were rescued by lifeboats.
Charlie Potwan	United States	Carrying a cargo of slack coal, the 52-ton sternwheel paddle steamer was swamped by the wakes of the passing Diamond and Coal Hill (Flags unknown), filled with water, capsized, and sank without loss of life at Eightmile Island on the Ohio River above Point Pleasant, West Virginia. Her cabin separated from her hull and floated downstream.
Chase	United Kingdom	The brigantine was wrecked on the Shipwash Sand, in the North Sea off the coast of Suffolk. Her crew took to a boat; they were rescued the next day by Excelsior (United Kingdom). Chase subsequently floated off and was driven ashore on the Kent coast. She was on a voyage from Newcastle upon Tyne, Northumberland to Liverpool, Lancashire.
Columbus	Rostock	The ship was abandoned in the North Sea. Her crew were rescued. She was on a voyage from Newcastle upon Tyne, Northumberland to Hamburg. Columbus was subsequently driven ashore on Spiekeroog, Kingdom of Hanover in a derelict condition.
Content	United Kingdom	The schooner was wrecked on the Salthous Bank, in the Irish Sea 5 nautical miles (9.3 km) south of Lytham St. Annes, Lancashire. Her six crew were rescued by the Lytham Lifeboat. Content was on a voyage from Dundalk, County Louth to Preston, Lancashire. She fkoated off the next day and sank.
Curlew	United Kingdom	The brig ran aground on the Newcombe Sand, in the North Sea off the coast of Suffolk and sank. Her crew were rescued. She was on a voyage from South Shields, County Durham to London.
Czar	United Kingdom	The ship ran aground at Sunderland, County Durham. She was on a voyage from Quebec City, Province of Canada, British North America to Sunderland. She was refloated.
Devonport	United Kingdom	The brig foundered off Pakefield, Suffolk. Her crew were rescued by the Kessingland Lifeboat. She was on a voyage from South Shields to London.
Devonside	United Kingdom	The ship ran aground on the Shipwash Sand, in the North Sea off the coast of Suffolk. She was on a voyage from South Shields to Naples, Italy. She was refloated and taken in to Lowestoft, Suffolk.
Diana	Sweden	The brig foundered off Porto, Portugal with the loss of four of her seven crew. She was on a voyage from Newcastle upon Tyne to Alexandria, Egypt.
Doane	United States	Carrying forage and freight, the 250-ton sternwheel paddle steamer ran aground, broke in two, and sank in 6 feet (1.8 m) of water in the Arkansas River about 20 nautical miles (37 km) above Dardanelle, Arkansas and 18 nautical miles (33 km) east of Clarksville.
Elizabeth	United Kingdom	The schooner ran aground on the Hinder Bank, in the North Sea off the Dutch coast and sank. Her crew survived.
CSS Florida	Confederate States Navy	American Civil War: While in United States Navy custody, the captured sloop-of-war, leaking after a collision on 19 November with USAT Alliance (United States Army) at Newport News, Virginia, sank in the James River below Newport News, Virginia at (37°04′24″N 76°32′35″W) after her seacocks were opened.
Freya	Norway	The barque was wrecked on Papa Stour, Shetland Islands, United Kingdom. Her crew were rescued.
Harbinger	United Kingdom	The barque was driven into another ship and severely damaged at Odesa, Russia.
Henry	United Kingdom	The ship ran aground at Carlingford, County Louth. She was on a voyage from Sulina, Ottoman Empire to Carlingford. She was refloated.
Hudiksvall	Norway	The ship ran aground at Lowestoft. She was on a voyage from Hudiksval to Lowestoft. She was refloated the next day and taken in to Lowestoft.
Jenny	(United Kingdom of Great Britain and Ireland) British North America	The barque ran aground on the Newcombe Sand, in the North Sea off the coast of Suffolk. She was on a voyage from South Shields to London. She was refloated and assisted in to Lowestoft in a leaky condition.
Julia	United Kingdom	The ship sprang a leak and was beached at Hartlepool, County Durham. She was on a voyage from South Shields to Wisbech, Cambridgeshire.
Mary Ann	United Kingdom	The brig ran aground on the Newcombe sand and sank. Her crew were rescued. She was on a voyage from South Shields to London.
Mindora, and an unnamed vessel	United Kingdom	The barque Mindora collided with another vessel in the English Channel 8 nautical miles (15 km) south west by west of the South Foreland, Kent. She was on a voyage from London to Victoria, British Columbia. The other vessel was abandoned in a sinking condition. Her crew were rescued by a tug.
Newton	United Kingdom	The brig ran aground on the Cutler Sand, in the North Sea off the coast of Suffolk. She was on a voyage from Hartlepool to Rochester, Kent. She was refloated and take in to Harwich, Essex in a severely leaky condition.
Pauline	France	The ship was wrecked near Zandvoort, North Holland, Netherlands. She was on a voyage from a Norwegian port to Pontrieux, Côtes-du-Nord.
Reaper	United Kingdom	The barque was driven ashore at Tynemouth, Northumberland. Her crew remained on board, refusing offers off assistance from two lifeboats – William Wake (United Kingdom) and the South Shields Lifeboat. She was on a voyage from London to South Shields. She was refloated and taken in to South Shields.
Regalia	United Kingdom	The ship was driven ashore at Cunningsburgh, Shetland Islands. She was on a voyage from Ystad, Sweden to London. Regalia was refloated in January 1865 and towed in to Lerwick, Shetland Islands.
Stranger	United Kingdom	The ship ran aground on the North Spit Sand, in the North Sea off the coast of Norfolk. She was on a voyage from Middlesbrough, Yorkshire to Callao, Peru. She was refloated with the assistance of three tugs and taken in to Great Yarmouth in a severely leaky condition.
Young Dixon	United Kingdom	The brig ran aground on the Herd Sand, in the North Sea off the coast of County Durham. She was refloated with assistance from a tug and towed in to South Shields.
Zenobia	United Kingdom	The barque was driven ashore at Odesa.
No. 50	Russia	The lighter was driven ashore at Odesa.
Unnamed	United Kingdom	The barque ran aground on the Black Middens. She was refloated with assistance from two tugs and towed in to the River Tyne.

== 29 November ==
List of shipwrecks: 29 November 1864
Ship	State	Description
Alcedo	United Kingdom	The ship was driven ashore at Arthurstown, County Wexford.
Boadicea	United Kingdom	The ship was abandoned in the Atlantic Ocean. Her crew were rescued by Balnaguith (United Kingdom). Boadicea was on a voyage from Indian Tickle, Labrador, British North America to London. She was taken in to the Isles of Scilly in a derelict condition.
Clyde	United Kingdom	The schooner was driven ashore and severely damaged at Moville, County Donegal. She was on a voyage from Londonderry to Troon, Ayrshire. She was refloated on 5 December.
Eleonole	Prussia	The brig ran aground on the Lappan Sand, in the Baltic Sea. She was refloated the next day and resumed her voyage.
Eweretta	United Kingdom	The ship was driven ashore in Loch Indaal. She was on a voyage from Quebec City, Province of Canada, British North America to the Clyde.
Gipsy	United Kingdom	The barque ran aground on the Haisborough Sands, in the North Sea off the coast of Norfolk. She was on a voyage from Quebec City to Berwick upon Tweed, Northumberland. She was refloated and towed in to Great Yarmouth, Norfolk in a leaky condition.
Governor Elias	United Kingdom	The brig was wrecked at Accra, Gold Coast. Her crew were rescued.
Islesman	United Kingdom	The steamship struck a sunken rock and sank in Loch Boisdale. All on board were rescued. She was on a voyage from Glasgow, Renfrewshire to the Outer Hebrides. Islesman was later raised. She was taken in to Ardrossan, Ayrshire on 20 January 1865.
Magenta	France	The ship was wrecked. Her crew were rescued. She was on a voyage from Cherbourg, Seine-Inférieure to Dinan, Côtes-du-Nord. .
Mercator	United Kingdom	The brig was run into by North American (United Kingdom) and sank in the River Mersey. Her crew were rescued. She was on a voyage from Odesa to Liverpool, Lancashire.
Percy	United Kingdom	The ship ran aground on the Panbush Rocks, on the coast of Northumberland. She was on a voyage from Amble, Northumberland to Dieppe, Seine-Inférieure, France. She was refloated and put back to Amble.
Racer	United Kingdom	The smack was wrecked at "Penrhyn Melyn", Caernarfonshire. She was on a voyage from Neath, Glamorgan to Woodend.
HMS Torch	Royal Navy	The Philomel-class gunvessel sprang a leak and was beached on Fernando Po, Portuguese Guinea.
Unidentified schooner	Confederate States of America	American Civil War, Union blockade: During a voyage to Matagorda, Texas, the 100-ton schooner, possibly named Carrie Mair, was forced aground and destroyed by the gunboat USS Itasca (United States Navy) on the coast of Texas about 5 nautical miles (9.3 km)north east of De Crow's Point.

== 30 November ==
List of shipwrecks: 30 November 1864
Ship	State	Description
Active	United Kingdom	The ship was driven ashore and wrecked at Flamborough Head, Yorkshire. Her crew were rescued. She was on a voyage from King's Lynn, Norfolk to Newcastle upon Tyne, Northumberland.
Arctos	Sweden	The brig was driven ashore at Brønnøy, Norway. She was on a voyage from Hartlepool, County Durham, United Kingdom to Gothenburg.
Elizabeth	United Kingdom	The ship sprang a leak and was abandoned in the Dogger Bank. Her crew were rescued. She was on a voyage from Hamburg to Sunderland, County Durham. She was taken in to Strömstad, Sweden in a derelict condition in December.
Friends	United Kingdom	The smack was driven ashore at Cymryan, Anglesey. She was on a voyage from Poole, Dorset to Runcorn, Cheshire.
Havelock	United Kingdom	The schooner was driven ashore and wrecked at How Wells, 7 nautical miles (13 km) from Kirkcudbright, with the loss of all hands. She was on a voyage from Kingstown, County Dublin to Preston, Lancashire.
Havfruen	Norway	The ship was driven ashore and wrecked at Stavanger with the loss of three of her crew. She was on a voyage from Hartlepool, County Durham to Stavanger.
Herring	United Kingdom	The schooner was driven ashore and wrecked at Whitby, Yorkshire. Her crew were rescued. She was on a voyage from Hartlepool, County Durham to Whitby.
Hotspur	United Kingdom	The ship ran aground at Canterbury Point.

== Unknown date ==
List of shipwrecks: Unknown date in November 1864
Ship	State	Description
Æolus	United Kingdom	The ship was driven ashore near Swinemünde, Prussia. She was refloated.
Akhira	Russia	The ship was driven ashore by ice at Kronstadt. She was on a voyage from Kronstadt to Aberdeen, United Kingdom. She was refloated.
Anna Elsina	Sweden	The ship was driven ashore near Gothenburg. She was on a voyage from Malmö to London, United Kingdom.
Astrea	United Kingdom	The ship was driven ashore. She was on a voyage from Hudiksvall, Sweden to London.
Auguste	France	The ship foundered. She was on a voyage from Noirmoutier, Vendée to Redon, Ille-et-Vilaine.
Ayrshire Lass	United Kingdom	The ship was wrecked in the Atlantic Ocean 200 nautical miles (370 km) west of Tory Island, County Donegal with the loss of 21 of her crew. She was on a voyage from Miramichi, New Brunswick, British North America to Ardrossan, Ayrshire. She arrive at Greenock, Renfrewshire in a waterlogged condition on 12 November under tow of the steamship Caledonia (United Kingdom).
Batavia	Netherlands	The steamship was driven ashore near Brielle, South Holland.
Beatrice	United Kingdom	American Civil War, Union blockade: The 342-gross register ton screw steamer, a blockade runner bound from Nassau, Bahamas, to Charleston, South Carolina, Confederate States of America, with a cargo that included artillery shells, was destroyed on the coast of South Carolina off Charleston, but sources differ on the date and circumstances of her destruction. According to one account, she was captured by picket boats of the South Atlantic Blockading Squadron (United States Navy) on 27 November, then was wrecked on Morris Island while under control of a U.S. Navy prize crew, becoming a total loss; according to another source, she took several shell hits from United States Navy warships and ran aground on Drunken Dick Shoal on 29 November, then was boarded by several boatloads of U.S. Navy sailors who captured 30 of her 35 crew and burned her.
Belle	United Kingdom	The schooner foundered in Lake Erie off Long Point, Province of Canada, British North America.
Briton	United Kingdom	The brig was driven ashore on Skagen, Denmark. She was on a voyage from Lowestoft, Suffolk to Gothenburg, Sweden. She had become a wreck by 16 November.
Catch-me	United Kingdom	The ship was wrecked at Falsterbo, Sweden. She was on a voyage from Sundsvall, Sweden to Bordeaux, Gironde, France.
Catherine Margaret	United Kingdom	The ship was driven ashore at Varde, Denmark. She was on a voyage from Portmadoc, Caernarfonshire to Hamburg.
Ceylon	United Kingdom	The brig was wrecked at Lingan, Nova Scotia, British North America.
Chevalier	United Kingdom	The ship was driven ashore and wrecked at Falsterbo. She was on a voyage from Kronstadt to London.
China	United Kingdom	The ship was abandoned in the Bay of Bengal.
Choice	United Kingdom	The ship was driven ashore at St. Margaret's Bay, Kent. Her crew were rescued. She was on a voyage from Colombo, Ceylon to London. She was refloated and resumed her voyage, but was consequently towed in to Ramsgate, Kent in a sinking condition.
City of Buffalo	United States	The 2,026-ton screw steamer sank in Lake Erie off Long Point.
Constantia	Flag unknown	The ship was wrecked. Her crew were rescued.
Crusader	United Kingdom	The ship was abandoned at sea. She was on a voyage from South Shields to Shanghai, China.
CSS Danube	Confederate States Navy	American Civil War: The floating battery was sunk as a blockship in the Spanish River gap in Mobile Bay on the coast of Alabama.
Dwina	Russia	The steamship was holed by ice at Saint Petersburg.
Eliza Jane	United Kingdom	The schooner capsized in the River Nene. She was refloated on 16 November and take in to Wisbech, Cambridgeshire.
Eliza Jane	United Kingdom	The ship was wrecked near Malmö, Sweden. She was on a voyage from Danzig to London.
Ellergill	United Kingdom	The barque was abandoned in the Bay of Biscay before 26 November. She was on a voyage from Newcastle upon Tyne, Northumberland to Barcelona, Spain.
Emily Nielson	United Kingdom	The ship was driven ashore on Öland, Sweden.
Empress	United Kingdom	The ship was wrecked at Old Calabar, Africa.
England	United Kingdom	The barque was abandoned at sea before 27 November. Her crew were rescued by a steamship. She was towed in to Milford Haven, Pembrokeshire on 2 December by the tug Tiger (United Kingdom).
Evangelistra	United Kingdom	The ship sprang a leak and was beached at Sulina, Ottoman Empire, where she was severely damaged.
Eva Honorine	United Kingdom	The schooner was driven ashore at Saint-Marc. Her crew were rescued She was on a voyage from Paimbœuf, Loire-Inférieure to Falmouth, Cornwall, United Kingdom.
Evangelistra	Greece	The brig was lost.
Express	United Kingdom	The ship was wrecked at Brass, Africa.
Fortuna	Sweden	The ship was driven ashore on Skagen. She was on a voyage from Málaga, Spain to Stockholm.
Hecla	United Kingdom	The schooner was driven ashore in the Belfast Lough. She was on a voyage from Drogheda, County Louth to Cardiff, Glamorgan. She was refloated and taken in to Belfast, County Antrim for repairs.
Helen	United Kingdom	The brigantine was driven ashore and wrecked at Ayr.
Helen's Bank	United Kingdom	The barque was driven ashore in the Isles of Scilly. She was on a voyage from Colombo, Ceylon to London. She was refloated with the assistance of the steamship Little Western (United Kingdom) and a pilot cutter.
Heroine	United Kingdom	The brig was wrecked on the coast of Cornwall. Five crew were rescued by the Newquay Lifeboat.
Ideal	(United Kingdom of Great Britain and Ireland) Jersey	The brigantine was wrecked at Cape Cove, Province of Canada. Her crew were rescued.
Indefatigable	Belgium	The brig was abandoned off The Lizard, Cornwall, United Kingdom. Her ten crew were rescued by the brigs Decisne (Spain) and Navy (United Kingdom). Indefatigable was on a voyage from Antwerp to Havana, Cuba. She was discovered derelict 30 nautical miles (56 km) off Queenstown, County Cork, United Kingdom on 23 November and was towed into that port.
Jane	United Kingdom	The ship sank off Land's End, Cornwall. She was on a voyage from Charlestown, Cornwall to Newport, Monmouthshire.
Jennie Hubbs	United States	The 220-ton sternwheel paddle steamer sank in the Ohio River near New Albany. She was later refloated, repaired, and returned to service.
J. Marsden	United Kingdom	The Yorkshire Billyboy was driven ashore at North Shields, Northumberland. She was refloated on 8 November.
Joanna	United Kingdom	The ship caught fire and was abandoned before 10 November.
John G. Morton	(United Kingdom of Great Britain and Ireland) British North America	The barque was abandoned in the Atlantic Ocean 300 nautical miles (560 km) west of the Isles of Scilly before 2 November. She was on a voyage from Demerara, British Guiana to Queenstown, County Cork.
Justyn	United Kingdom	The ship was abandoned in the Atlantic Ocean before 12 November. Her crew were rescued by Norton Hale (United Kingdom).
Khersonese	United Kingdom	The ship collided with another vessel off Folkestone, Kent and was abandoned. At least eleven crew survived.
Lambert	United Kingdom	The ship foundered. She was on a voyage from Málaga, Spain to London.
Laura	United States	The ship was wrecked at the mouth of the Grande de Santiago River. She was on a voyage from New York to Matamoros, Mexico.
Maitland	United Kingdom	The ship was holed by ice at Saint Petersburg. She was refloated on 12 November.
Margaretta Morris	United Kingdom	The ship was destroyed by fire at Ceará, Brazil.
Marietta	Spain	The brig was wrecked on Anticosti Island, Nova Scotia. Her crew survived. She was on a voyage from Havana to Quebec City, Province of Canada, British North America.
Mary	United Kingdom	The Yorkshire Billyboy was driven ashore at North Shields. She was refloated on 8 November.
Mary Anne Elliott	United Kingdom	The ship was wrecked near Agrigento, Sicily, Italy. She was on a voyage from Agrigento to Liverpool, Lancashire.
Matilde	Bremen	The barque was wrecked near Hong Kong.
North Eastern	United Kingdom	The steamship foundered in the Baltic Sea with the loss of all twenty crew. She was on a voyage from Danzig to Hull, Yorkshire.
Ocean Pearl	United States	The ship was wrecked off Tarragona, Spain.
Orion	Denmark	The ship foundered off the Shetland Islands, United Kingdom on or before 28 November.
Peace	United Kingdom	The ship foundered off Madagascar before 7 November. Her crew were rescued. She was on a voyage from London to Bombay, India.
Preciosa	United Kingdom	The ship ran aground near Marstrand, Sweden. She was refloated and found to be severely leaky.
Principe Umberto	Italy	The ship foundered. She was on a voyage from La Laja, United States of Colombia to Newcastle upon Tyne.
Queen of England	United Kingdom	The ship was driven ashore. She was on a voyage from Memel, Prussia to Dublin. She was refloated and put in to Helsingør, Denmark.
Queen of Perth	Flag unknown	The 96-ton schooner was wrecked on the Taranaki coast, New Zealand in early November.
Rock City	United Kingdom	The ship was holed by ice at Saint Petersburg.
Rosita	United Kingdom	The ship was driven ashore at Libau. She was on a voyage from South Shields to Libau.
Rotterdam	Netherlands	The ship foundered. She was on a voyage from Ängelholm, Sweden to an English port.
Run Her	United Kingdom	The steamship was wrecked in Augra Bay, Terceira Island, Azores. She was on a voyage from London to Bermuda.
Sarah	United Kingdom	The schooner was wrecked on the coast of County Waterford. Her six crew were rescued by the Tramore Lifeboat.
Scinde	France	The ship was wrecked at Bimlipatam, India. Her crew were rescued.
Skulda	Sweden	The ship was driven ashore and wrecked in the Isles of Scilly. She was on a voyage from Cardiff to Stockholm.
Texian Khis	Greece	The brig was lost.
Torch Lake	United States	The 20-ton screw steamer foundered at Sturgeon Bay, Wisconsin.
Totness	United Kingdom	The ship was driven ashore near Kronstadt and was abandoned by her crew. She was on a voyage from Hull to Kronstadt.
Velore	United Kingdom	The barque was driven ashore and wrecked at Visby, Sweden. She was on a voyage from Gävle, Sweden to Paimbœuf.
Virginia	Greece	The brig was lost in the Sea of Azov.
Wesselburen	(Denmark) Duchy of Schleswig	The ship foundered. She was on a voyage from Jakobstad, Grand Duchy of Finland to Hull.
No. 26	Russia	The lighter sank at Odesa.
Unnamed	Flag unknown	The ship was wrecked on Yell, Shetland Island on or before 28 November.
Unnamed	Flag unknown	The ship was wrecked on Mousa, Shetland Islands on or before 28 November.
