= USS Undine (1863) =

Gunboat of the United States Navy

- A profile drawing of USS Undine (1992)

History

United States
- Name: USS Undine
- Launched: 1863
- Acquired: by purchase, March 7, 1864
- Commissioned: April 1864
- Fate: Captured by Confederate forces, October 30, 1864, and then burned by them to prevent recapture, November 4, 1864

General characteristics
- Type: Sternwheel tinclad warship
- Tonnage: 179 tons
- Propulsion: Steam engine(s) fed by two boilers
- Complement: 52
- Armament: 8 × 24-pounder Dahlgren howitzers

The first USS Undine was a sternwheel steamer and tinclad warship that served with both the Union and Confederate forces during the American Civil War. Built in Cincinnati, Ohio, as Ben Gaylord for civilian trade on the Ohio River, the ship was purchased by the Navy in March 1864 and renamed. Converted to a tinclad (a type of lightly-armored vessel used on inland rivers during the war) and commissioned the following month, Undine originally served on the Mississippi River before being transferred to the Tennessee River. In July 1864, the vessel sank after hitting a snag (submerged tree) near Clifton, Tennessee, but was refloated a week later. Undine was then involved in an operation at Eastport, Mississippi, on October 10.

While responding to the sound of a fight between Nathan Bedford Forrest's Confederate cavalry raiders and a transport on October 30, Undine was damaged and surrendered to Forrest's troops. Taken into Confederate service, Undine participated in Forrest's movement against the Union supply depot at Johnsonville, Tennessee. With Undine caught between two Union naval forces, the Confederates burned the captured tinclad on November 4. What is left of Undine lies beneath Kentucky Lake.

== Civil War operations ==
=== Early activities ===
The packet steamer Ben Gaylord was built by Captain Uriah B. Scott at Cincinnati, Ohio, in 1863. A sternwheel steamer with a wooden hull and a tonnage of 179 tons, Ben Gaylord was intended for use in civilian trade between the Ohio River towns of Portsmouth, Ohio, and Parkersburg, West Virginia. (Note: West Virginia separated from the state of Virginia (which had joined the Confederacy) in 1863 and rejoined the United States.) (Note: One article about Undine written by Donald H. Steenburn quotes records which indicate that the ship "measured 129 tons and 51/95".) It is known that the vessel had two boilers, but no information on her dimensions is available. (Note: The records quoted by Steenburn provide a beam of 27 feet (8.2 m), a length of 140 feet (43 m), and a "depth" of 3 feet 8 inches (1.12 m).) On March 7, 1864, the steamer was acquired by the Union Navy for military use in the American Civil War. The purchase took place at Cincinnati, at a cost of $35,600, which is equivalent to $579,000 in 2024. After acquisition, the government renamed the vessel Undine after the mythical class of water nymphs. Undine was sent to Mound City, Illinois, to be outfitted as a tinclad warship. Tinclads were lightly armored naval vessels used on inland rivers by the Union during the Civil War. They were not actually armored with tin – the name was used to distinguish the vessels from the more heavily-armored ironclads. Undine's armor consisted of 0.25-inch (0.64 cm) and 0.5-inch (1.3 cm) iron plates. The tinclads were all assigned identifying numbers, which were painted on the side of each ship's pilothouse; Undine was given the identification number 55. Her military commissioning occurred at Mound City the month after her purchase. She was under the command of Acting Master John L. Bryant and was armed with eight smoothbore 24-pounder Dahlgren howitzers. Undine's muster rolls list 52 sailors who were part of her crew.

Assigned to the Mississippi River Squadron after commissioning, Undine served on the Mississippi River beginning in May 1864, operating between Natchez and Fort Adams, Mississippi. She was reassigned, and by July 1864 was operating on the Tennessee River. On July 25, while near Clifton, Tennessee, Undine struck a snag (submerged tree) while backing off a riverbank and sank. Bryant and his crew were able to remove the ship's armament and most of the ammunition stores. Undine's bow was in a deeper part of the river than the stern; the former was 14 feet (4.3 m) underwater, while the latter was only 2 feet (0.61 m). The vessel's armament was used as part of the defenses of Clifton while Undine was raised. The salvage process was completed on August 1, with the assistance of Little Champion, a pump steamer.

On either October 9 or October 10, Undine left Clifton along with the tinclad USS Key West and three transports: City of Pekin, Kenton, and Aurora. The transports were carrying troops from the 113th Illinois Infantry Regiment on an expedition to Eastport, Mississippi, as part of operations against the Confederate cavalry raider Nathan Bedford Forrest. The commander of the 113th Illinois failed to scout the area around Eastport after landing on October 10, and the troops were ambushed by part of Forrest's command under Lieutenant Colonel David C. Kelley. His troops drove the Union soldiers back to the transports in disarray. Undine and Key West provided covering fire, although a contemporary newspaper report in the Chicago Daily Tribune claimed that the two tinclads caused more friendly fire casualties than they inflicted on the Confederates. The convoy withdrew and reached Paducah, Kentucky, on October 12.

=== Johnsonville ===
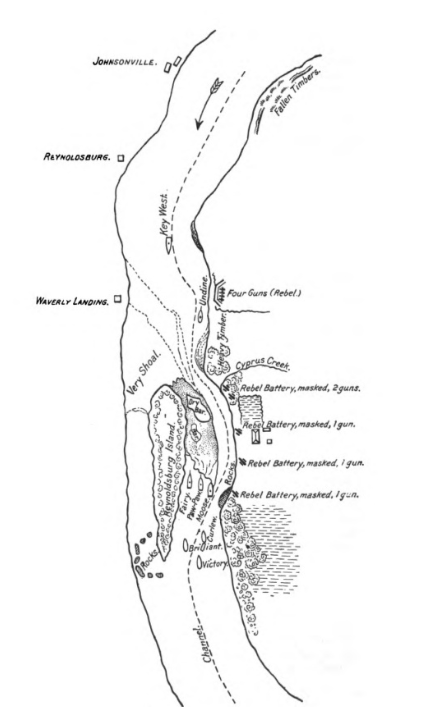
Map of the naval action near Reynoldsburg Island, in which Undine took part

Undine, along with Key West and the tinclads USS Tawah and USS Elfin, frequently operated out of Johnsonville, Tennessee. During October 1864, Forrest's cavalry was raiding along the Tennessee River to damage the Union supply lines in the area and disrupt the Atlanta campaign from a distance. Undine escorted the transport Anna on October 30 from Johnsonville to Sandy Island. Undine turned back towards Johnsonville, but near Paris Landing, Tennessee, the transport came under fire from some of Forrest's artillery. The transport was damaged but was able to escape to Paducah. The sound of the fighting caught the attention of Undine, and the Union vessel steamed back downriver to investigate. Undine came under fire from the Confederates on the west side of the river at Paris Landing, and was severely damaged after a fight of nearly an hour. One of the Confederate shots caused damage that temporarily put out the tinclad's boiler fires; another damaged her exhaust system.

Bryant ordered Undine to be maneuvered out of range of the Confederates and anchored along the east bank of the Tennessee River. While repairs were going on, Undine came under Confederate small arms fire from across the river, but the Confederates were driven off by her artillery after an hour of fighting. Another Union transport, Venus, came downriver from Johnsonville, and after ignoring warning signals from Undine, came under Confederate fire. The transport's captain was killed, but the vessel's crew was still able to get the craft to Undine. Shortly thereafter, another transport, J. W. Cheeseman, arrived. Confederate fire knocked out the steering system of J. W. Cheeseman, and the transport drifted to the Confederate side of the river and was captured. While Confederate troops and the captured crew of J. W. Cheeseman unloaded the transport, other Confederate troops moved downriver to attack Undine and Venus. Fighting followed for several hours. Damage to Undine's steam pipe caused steam to enter the engine room. Running low on ammunition, Bryant ordered the ship to be abandoned and the guns spiked, of which only two were. (Note: Spiking cannons refers to the process of disabling a gun by obstructing its vent; this was often done by driving a spike into the vent.) Attempts to destroy her failed. Bryant struck his colors at roughly 4:00 p.m. A court of inquiry later cleared Bryant and his crew of any blame in the loss of Undine. The Confederates captured a copy of the Union signal codes along with the vessel. The loss of the codes led to widespread fears in the Union Navy that the Confederates could now read Union signals, but the Confederates may not have even been aware the codes were on Undine. Naval historian Robert Gudmestad attributes the loss of Undine to the lack of experience of her crew, almost all of whom had joined the navy earlier in 1864.

Confederate troops crossed the Tennessee on rafts and repaired Undine and Venus enough to bring the steamers to Paris Landing, while J. W. Cheeseman was burned due to the severity of her damage. A Confederate officer with prewar steamboat experience, Captain Frank Gracey, was placed in command of Undine, and some of Forrest's troops were transferred to the two ships to operate them. The soldiers transferred to the two vessels were referred to as horse marines; some may have previously seen action on the ironclad warship CSS Arkansas. Forrest's artillery commander, Captain John W. Morton, had previously declined the command of Forrest's fleet. The cavalrymen steamed the vessels between Paris Landing and Fort Heiman as operational practice. Early on November 1, Forrest's troops moved out towards Johnsonville, accompanied by Undine and Venus. On the afternoon of November 2, Key West and Tawah were sent downriver from Johnsonville and encountered the two Confederate-operated ships. Venus had gotten ahead of Undine, and after twenty minutes of fighting, the Confederates ran the transport aground and abandoned the ship, which was recaptured by the Union forces. Undine was able to escape downriver. Meanwhile, a force of six tinclads – USS Curlew, USS Fairy, USS Paw Paw, USS Victory, USS Brilliant, and USS Moose – was coming up from the other end of the Tennessee River.

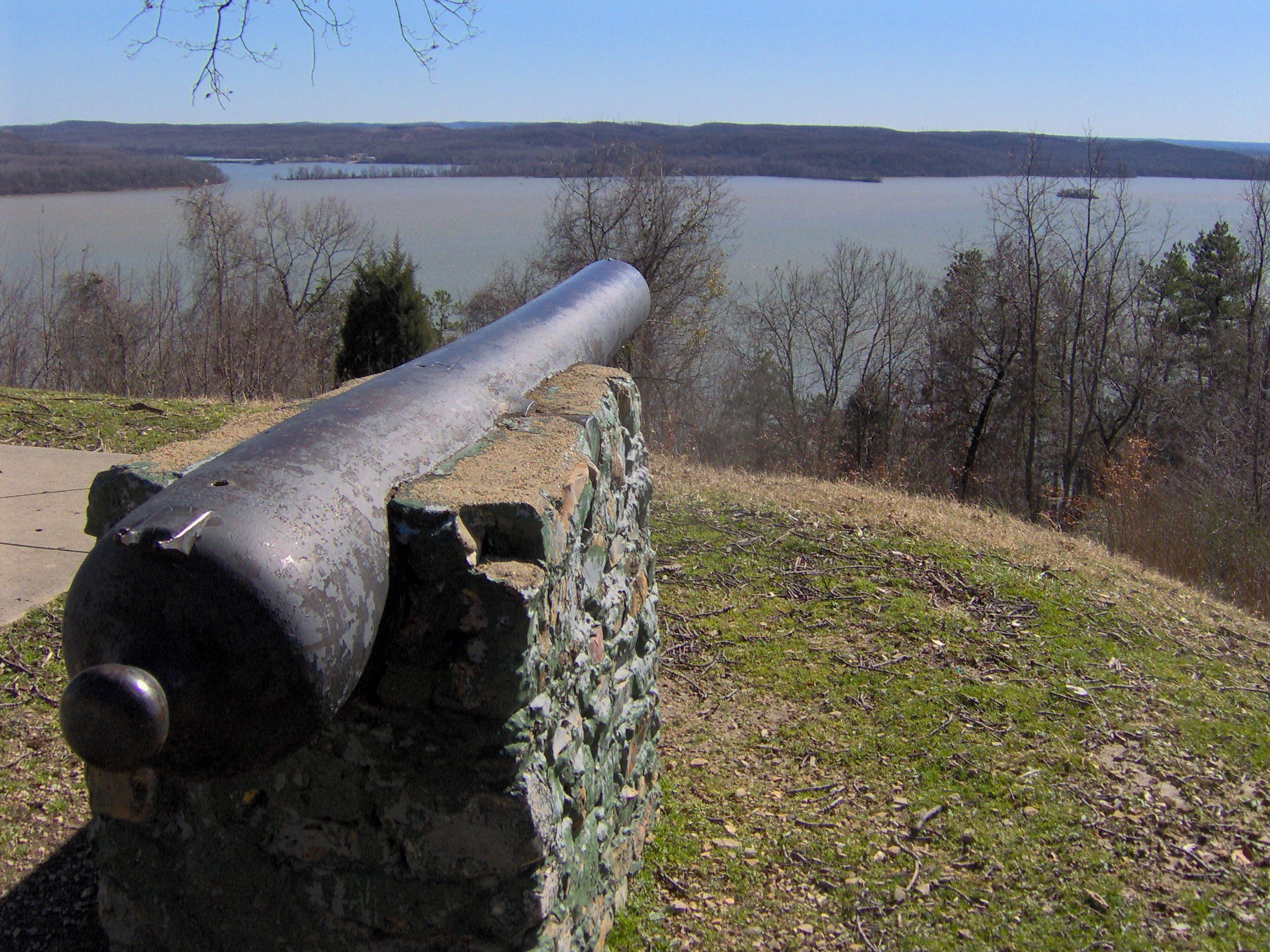
A cannon at Nathan Bedford Forrest State Park overlooking the former site of Johnsonville

Forrest and Undine reached Reynoldsburg Island, which was 3.5 miles (5.6 km) from Johnsonville, on November 3. Undine was used as bait to draw the Union tinclads at Johnsonville towards Forrest's artillery, Tawah attempted to attack Undine twice, but the Confederate vessel was able to maneuver away back towards the Confederate batteries. On the morning of November 4, Undine again moved down towards Johnsonville. The tinclads at Johnsonville advanced towards Undine, hoping to reach the six tinclads further downriver, which were under the command of Lieutenant Commander LeRoy Fitch, but the lead ship, Key West, was repeatedly driven back by Confederate artillery fire. Still, Undine was trapped between the two Union forces and had taken some damage. Unable to escape, Gracey had Undine intentionally run aground on a sandbar. Oil-soaked mattresses were piled in the ship's magazine and then lit with a lamp. Gracey and the Confederate crew escaped as Undine went up in flames. The gunboat's magazine detonated at around 11:00 a.m.

Forrest's troops opened fire on the Union defenses and depot at Johnsonville later that day, opening the Battle of Johnsonville. Key West and Tawah suffered severe damage, and the Union troops burned the two gunboats along with Elfin to prevent their capture if Johnsonville fell. Large quantities of supplies and a number of transports were destroyed at Johnsonville, much of which was burned by the Union forces, although Forrest did not take the town. The tinclad USS Kate was ordered in June 1865 to "raise or wreck, as the case may require" the wrecks of Undine, Key West, Elfin, Tawah, and three coal barges. Two of the 24-pounder howitzers were recovered that month, and additional items were salvaged in August. Kate's commander reported the recovery of iron plating, five 24-pounder howitzers, a safe, and 125 feet (38 m) of hog chains from Undine; the report also indicated that the wreck was being broken up. The area where Undine sank became part of Kentucky Lake in the 1940s when the area was flooded as part of a Tennessee Valley Authority project. Divers later found a 90-foot (27 m) timber which was originally thought to be from Undine, but a 1993 archaeological study determined the artifact was from the wreck of a postwar barge. In the early 21st century, the combined efforts of several private and governmental entities located the remains of Undine's burned hull.

== See also ==
- Anaconda Plan

== Sources ==
- Gaines, W. Craig (2008). Encyclopedia of Civil War Shipwrecks. Baton Rouge, Louisiana: Louisiana State University Press. ISBN 978-0-8071-3274-6.
- Gudmestad, Robert (2025). The Devil's Own Purgatory: The United States Mississippi River Squadron in the Civil War. Baton Rouge, Louisiana: Louisiana State University Press. ISBN 978-0-8071-8491-2.
- Hess, Earl J. (2023). Civil War Field Artillery: Promise and Performance on the Battlefield. Baton Rouge, Louisiana: Louisiana State University Press. ISBN 978-0-8071-7800-3.
- Lee, Dan (2019). General Hylan B. Lyon: A Kentucky Confederate and the War in the West. Knoxville, Tennessee: University of Tennessee Press. ISBN 9781621904878.
- Silverstone, Paul H. (1989). Warships of the Civil War Navies. Annapolis, Maryland: Naval Institute Press. ISBN 0-87021-783-6.
- Smith, Myron J. (2010). Tinclads in the Civil War: Union Light-Draught Gunboat Operations on Western Waters, 1862–1865. Jefferson, North Carolina: McFarland & Company. ISBN 978-0-7864-3579-1.
- Smith, Myron J. (2021). After Vicksburg: The Civil War on Western Waters, 1863–1865. Jefferson, North Carolina: McFarland & Company. ISBN 978-1-4766-4370-0.
- Steenburn, Donald H. (1996). "The United States Ship Undine". Civil War Times Illustrated. Vol. 35, no. 4. p. 27.
- Way, Frederick (1994). Way's Packet Directory, 1848–1994: Passenger Steamboats of the Mississippi River System Since the Advent of Photography in Mid-Continent America. Athens, Ohio: Ohio University Press. ISBN 0821411063.
- Wenner, Joan (2004). "The Gunboat Undine Traded Sides During an 1864 Raid by Nathan B. Forrest Along the Tennessee River". America's Civil War. Vol. 17, no. 4. pp. 14, 16, 72.
- Wooten, Jerry T. (2024) [2019]. Johnsonville: Union Supply Operations on the Tennessee River and the Battle of Johnsonville, November 4–5, 1864. El Dorado Hills, California: Savas Beatie. ISBN 978-1-61121-541-0.
