= USS Curlew (1862) =

Gunboat of the United States Navy

History

United States
- Name: Curlew (originally Florence)
- Namesake: Curlew
- Acquired: December 17, 1862
- Commissioned: February 16, 1863
- Decommissioned: July 5, 1865
- Fate: Sold, August 17, 1865

General characteristics
- Type: Stern-wheel steamer, converted into a gunboat
- Tonnage: 196 tons
- Length: 159 ft (48 m)
- Beam: 32 ft 1 in (9.78 m)
- Draught: 4 ft (1.2 m) or 4 ft 6 in (1.37 m)
- Propulsion: 2x steam engines
- Speed: 4 knots (7.4 km/h; 4.6 mph)
- Armament: 8x 24-pounder Dahlgren boat howitzers
- Armour: Tinclad

USS Curlew was a stern-wheel steamer that saw service for the Union Navy during the American Civil War. Built in 1862 in Pennsylvania as a civilian vessel, she was purchased by the Union Navy on December 17, 1862. Converted into a tinclad warship, she saw service from 1863 to 1865, often serving on the Mississippi River, the Ohio River, and the Tennessee River. In May 1863, she was involved in a minor action against Confederate forces on the Mississippi River off of the shore of Arkansas. July saw Curlew take part in an expedition up the Red River of the South, the Tensas River, the Black River, and the Ouachita River that captured two steamers and destroyed two more and a sawmill. On May 24, 1864, she dueled with Pratt's Texas Battery while on the Mississippi River, and on November 4 of that same year, was near the action of the Battle of Johnsonville but was unable to join the fighting. Decommissioned on June 5, 1865, she was sold in mid-August and her further career is unknown.

== Construction and characteristics ==
In late 1861 or in 1862, the stern-wheel steamer Florence was constructed at Elizabeth, Pennsylvania. She had a tonnage of 196 tons, a length of 159 feet (48 m), a beam of 32 feet 1 inch (9.78 m), and a draft of 4 feet (1.2 m) or 4 feet 6 inches (1.37 m). Powered by two engines and two boilers, her machinery was reported to produce a speed of 4 knots (7.4 km/h; 4.6 mph) against a current of unstated strength. Beginning in March 1862, Florence ran the civilian trade route between Pittsburgh, Pennsylvania, and St. Louis, Missouri, with Z. C. Brickell as her captain. The vessel was sold to a group led by Will Kyle in June. Kyle in turn sold Florence to the Union Navy on December 17 at a cost of $21,500, for military service in the American Civil War. She was converted into a tinclad warship (Note: A variant of the ironclad warship with only light metal armor) and renamed Curlew, after a type of bird. Curlew was commissioned on February 16, 1863, at Cairo, Illinois, with acting Master George Hentig in command. She was initially armed with eight 24-pounder Dahlgren boat howitzers, but according to naval historian Paul Silverstone, was instead armed with six 32-pounders and one rifled 20-pounder at a later point during her service history. In June 1863, the tinclads were assigned identifying numbers which were painted on the ships' pilothouses; Curlew was given the number 12.

== Service history ==
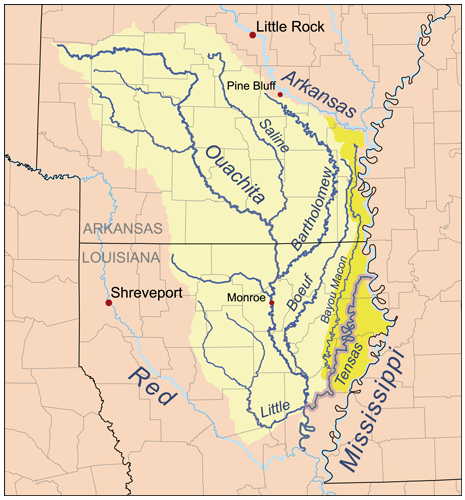
Map showing the Tensas, Red, Ouachita, and Mississippi Rivers, all of which Curlew served on

On February 17, 1863, Curlew left Cairo, Illinois, to join the fleet of Admiral David Dixon Porter. She served on patrol duty on the Mississippi River, and in May was reported to be serving on the White River, where she captured four Confederate soldiers. On May 29, Curlew was reported to be under the command of acting Ensign R. A. Turner, as Hentig had been arrested earlier that month; he was dismissed from the military in June. On June 2, she took part in a minor action against Confederate forces on the shore of Arkansas in a Union Army-Navy joint expedition, raiding what was believed to be the position of Confederate troops that had earlier fired on a Union transport. Over the course of a little over a week in mid-July, she was part of a multi-vessel expedition led by Lieutenant Commander Thomas O. Selfridge Jr. that moved into the Red River of the South, Black River, Tensas River, and Ouachita River. The Union ships captured two steamers (one in a tributary of the Black River and the other in the Tensas), destroyed two others, and also destroyed a sawmill, a quantity of lumber, and Confederate supplies. Turner was killed by a provost marshal in August and was replaced by acting Ensign H. B. O'Neill.

From December 23 through January 14, 1864, Curlew saw service on the Ohio River and the Tennessee River, before going to Mound City, Illinois, to be repaired. Leaving Mound City on March 12, she took members of the United States Coast Survey to Grand Gulf, Mississippi. On May 24, Curlew was engaged in an action with Pratt's Texas Battery on the Mississippi River off the coast of Arkansas. The Confederate artillerymen and the Union gunboat dueled for about 20 to 35 minutes, with Curlew taking several hits and firing 28 shots. Curlew signaled with her ship's whistle for the nearby timberclad USS Tyler to come to her aid, but the Confederate artillery left before Tyler arrived. Further upriver, Curlew met the tinclad USS Romeo, and the two vessels escorted the transport Nicholas Longworth until Curlew suffered a mechanical breakdown. Romeo and the transport continued upriver and came under Confederate fire. No sailors on Curlew were injured during the fighting.

On May 31, Curlew returned to Mound City before again going on the Mississippi on June 30. Patrolling between Natchez, Mississippi, and Vicksburg, Mississippi, she sometimes skirmished with Confederate land forces. She then moved upriver beginning on October 24 to again serve on the Ohio and the Tennessee; while still on the Mississippi on October 27, she assisted the passenger steamer Belle Saint Louis, which had beem nearly captured by Confederate cavalry. Arriving at Paducah, Kentucky, on November 2, Curlew was then sent up the Tennessee in company of two other warships. On November 4, Curlew was part of a group of six steamers that came to the aid of the gunboats USS Key West, USS Tawah, and USS Elfin who were heavily engaged with Confederate artillery on shore during the Battle of Johnsonville. The narrowness of the Tennessee River at that location and Confederate shore fire prevented Curlew and the other five would-be relief ships from rescuing Key West, Tawah, and Elfin, and the latter three were destroyed. From February 1865 to mid-June of that year, Curlew was tasked with making surveys of the river near Cairo and Mound City. A military return dated March 1 indicated that Curlew was assigned to the Ninth District of the Mississippi River Squadron, was armed with eight cannons, and was commanded by acting Master M. Hickey, while another dated April 1 listed her as being assigned to special duty, still under the command of Hickey. She was decommissioned on July 5 and sold at an auction on August 17 for $7,600. Her further career is unknown.

== Sources ==
- Civil War Naval Chronology, 1861–1865. Washington, D.C.: Naval History Division. 1971.
- Konstam, Angus (2013). Mississippi River Gunboats of the American Civil War 1861–1865. Osprey. ISBN 9781472800954.
- Official Records of the Union and Confederate Navies in the War of the Rebellion, Series 1. U. S. Naval War Records Office. Office memoranda. Vol. 24. Washington, D.C.: Government Printing Office. 1911.
- Official Records of the Union and Confederate Navies in the War of the Rebellion, Series 1. U. S. Naval War Records Office. Office memoranda. Vol. 25. Washington, D.C.: Government Printing Office. 1912.
- Official Records of the Union and Confederate Navies in the War of the Rebellion, Series 1. U. S. Naval War Records Office. Office memoranda. Vol. 26. Washington, D.C.: Government Printing Office. 1914.
- Official Records of the Union and Confederate Navies in the War of the Rebellion, Series 1. U. S. Naval War Records Office. Office memoranda. Vol. 27. Washington, D.C.: Government Printing Office. 1917.
- Official Records of the Union and Confederate Navies in the War of the Rebellion, Series 2. U. S. Naval War Records Office. Office memoranda. Vol. 1. Washington, D.C.: Government Printing Office. 1921.
- Palucka, Tim (2017). "Timberclads, Tinclads, and Cottonclads in the US Civil War". MRS Bulletin. 42 (1): 73. Bibcode:2017MRSBu..42...73P. doi:10.1557/mrs.2016.317. ISSN 1938-1425.
- Silverstone, Paul H. (1989). Warships of the Civil War Navies. Annapolis, Maryland: Naval Institute Press. ISBN 0-87021-783-6.
- Smith, Myron J. (2010). Tinclads in the Civil War: Union Light-Draught Gunboat Operations on Western Waters, 1862–1865. Jefferson, North Carolina: McFarland & Company. ISBN 978-0-7864-3579-1.
- Smith, Myron J. (2021). After Vicksburg: The Civil War on Western Waters, 1863–1865. Jefferson, North Carolina: McFarland & Company. ISBN 978-1-4766-4370-0.
- Way, Frederick (1994). Way's Packet Directory, 1848–1994: Passenger Steamboats of the Mississippi River System Since the Advent of Photography in Mid-Continent America. Athens, Ohio: Ohio University Press. ISBN 0821411063.
