= USS Key West (1862) =

Gunboat of the United States Navy

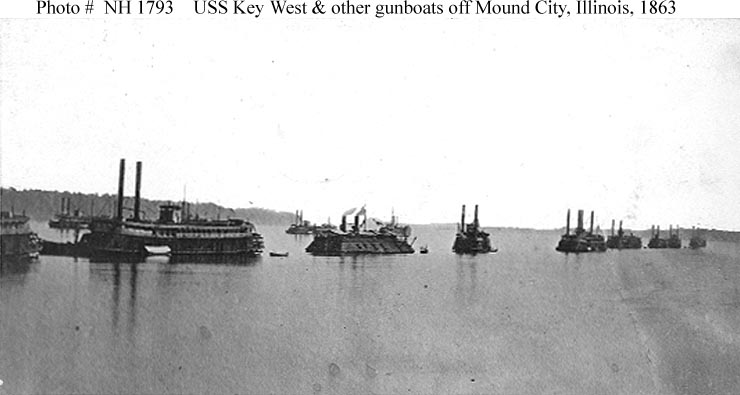
- USS Key West at left

History

United States
- Name: USS Key West
- Namesake: Key West, Florida
- Launched: 1862
- Acquired: 16 April 1863
- Commissioned: 26 May 1863
- Fate: Scuttled, 4 November 1864

General characteristics
- Displacement: 207 tons
- Length: 156 ft (48 m)
- Beam: 32 ft (9.8 m)
- Depth of hold: 4 ft 6 in (1.37 m)
- Propulsion: steam engine; stern wheel-propelled
- Armament: 6 × 24-pounder howitzers

USS Key West was a steamer acquired by the Union Navy during the American Civil War. She was used by the Union Navy as a convoy and patrol vessel on Confederate waterways, only to be sunk, along with Elfin and Tawah by Confederate shore batteries.

== Service history ==
Key West was built in 1862 at California, Pennsylvania, as Key West No. 8; purchased by the Navy from W. S. Evans et al. at Cairo, Illinois, 16 April 1863; and commissioned 26 May, Acting Master E. M. King in command. The wooden stern-wheel steamer departed Cairo that day for patrol duty in the Tennessee River, supporting Union Army efforts and protecting Federal positions in the Tennessee Valley from Confederate Cavalry raids. Frequently, as she patrolled the river and escorted transports and supply ships, her guns engaged hit-and-run batteries and bands of riflemen.

On 10 October 1864, as troops debarked at Eastport, Mississippi, from three transports Key West and Undine had escorted from Clifton, Tennessee, a hidden Confederate 6-gun battery at Eastport and a 3-gun battery near Chickasaw opened fire on the Union ships. After the Southern guns had set two of the transports on fire and damaged Key West with two rifle shots, the Union ships reluctantly retired downstream out-of-range. On 2 November at Johnsonville, Tennessee, Key West assisted Tawah in recapturing transport Venus, taken along with Undine and Cheeseman by the Confederates there 30 October. On 4 November Key West, Tawah, and Elfin were caught in a narrow, shallow section of the river near Johnsonville by a Confederate force under General Nathan B. Forrest. After a vigorous action in which Key West was hit 19 times by rifled artillery, the three Union gunboats, riddled and almost out of ammunition, were set afire and scuttled.
