= USS Elfin =

USS Elfin has been the name of more than one United States Navy ship, and may refer to:

- USS Elfin (1864), a gunboat commissioned in February 1864 and burned in November 1864
- USS Elfin (SP-965), a patrol boat in commission from 1917 to 1918

== See also ==
- USS Elf (SP-81)
