= Johnsonville State Historic Park =

State park in Tennessee, United States

Johnsonsville State Historic Park
- Interactive map of Johnsonsville State Historic Park
- Type: Tennessee State Park
- Location: New Johnsonville, Tennessee
- Coordinates: 36°03′42″N 87°57′59″W
- Area: 2,000 acres (8.1 km^{2})
- Created: 1971
- Operator: Tennessee State Parks
- Open: Year around
- Website: Johnsonville State Historic Park
- Johnsonville Historic District
- U.S. National Register of Historic Places
- U.S. Historic district
- MPS: Civil War Historic and Historic Archeological Resources in Tennessee MPS
- NRHP reference No.: 01000257
- Added to NRHP: 2001

Johnsonville State Historic Park is a state park in Humphreys County in the U.S. state of Tennessee. This 1,075-acre (4.35 km^{2}) park commemorates the Battle of Johnsonville, which was fought in 1864 during the Civil War, and the historic town site of Johnsonville, which was inundated by the creation of Kentucky Lake by the Tennessee Valley Authority in the 1940s. It is located north of New Johnsonville.

== History ==
The park commemorates the Battle of Johnsonville and the historic town site that was in existence from 1864 to 1944. The town was flooded by the creation of Kentucky Lake in 1944.

== Activities ==
There several things to do at Johnsonville:

=== Birding ===
There is a wooded trail that provides a look several species of birds including Gulls, Sandpipers, Woodpeckers and White-breasted Nuthatches. And sometimes even Bald Eagles.

During winter and migration times one will see Bay Ducks and Ring-tailed Gulls.

=== Fishing ===
The Tennessee River's impoundment of Kentucky Lake provides fishing opportunities.

=== Hiking ===
There are three hiking trails in the park:

- Historic Johnsonville Trail is 2.05 miles long
- African-American Cemetery Loop Trail is 0.35 miles long
- Civil War Forts Trail is 0.65 miles long
- Old Railway Trail is 0.7 miles long
