= USS Tawah =

Gunboat of the United States Navy

History

United States
- Acquired: 19 June 1863
- Commissioned: circa June 1863
- Fate: Sunk during combat, 4 November 1864

General characteristics
- Displacement: 108 tons
- Length: 114 ft (35 m)
- Beam: 33 ft (10 m)
- Depth of hold: depth of hold 3 ft 9 in (1.14 m)
- Propulsion: steam engine; side wheel-propelled
- Armament: 4 × 24-pounder guns; 2 × 30-pounder Parrott rifles; 2 × 12-pounder guns

USS Tawah was a 108-ton steamer acquired by the Union Navy during the American Civil War.

Tawah was used by the Union Navy as a convoy and patrol vessel on Confederate waterways, only to be sunk, along with USS Elfin and USS Key West by Confederate shore batteries.

== Service history ==
Tawah (Gunboat No. 29)—a wooden river steamer, formerly named Ebenezer—was purchased by Rear Admiral David Dixon Porter on 19 June 1863 from Ebenezer Blackstone, St. Louis, Missouri. Tawah was assigned to the Mississippi Squadron under the command of Acting Master Alfred Phelps Jr. In October 1863, she was assigned to patrol the Tennessee River and remained there until the following year. In April 1864, Tawah, USS Paw Paw, Key West, and USS Alfred Robb were employed in convoying Army transports up the Tennessee River, in addition to being on the lookout for Confederate shipping. At this time, Tawah was reported to be a miserable ship at best and badly in need of repairs.

On 2 November, Tawah and Key West encountered USS Undine and Venus, which the Confederates had captured three days earlier. After a running battle, Venus was recaptured. Undine, a "tinclad" of eight 24-pounder brass howitzers, was able to outrun the Union ships and escape to the protection of Confederate shore batteries on Reynoldsburg Island. When Venus was recaptured, there were two 20-pounder Parrott rifles and over 200 rounds of ammunition on board. On 4 November, Tawah, Key West, and Elfin were patrolling the river to protect the Union headquarters and depot at Johnsonville when Confederate forces under the command of General Nathan B. Forrest attacked the city.

Undine came up river from the protection of the Confederate batteries, and the three Union ships moved down to attack her. The Confederates burned Undine and opened fire on the Union ships with their shore batteries. They were using heavy, rifled guns, and the three Union ships were badly outgunned. The Confederates moved their batteries along the shore and severely shelled the three ships as well as other gunboats, transports, and the wharfs. After fighting fiercely for several hours, Tawah's Parrott guns on the starboard bow were disabled; and all three ships had been damaged, in addition to having expended most of their ammunition. The Union gunboats were abandoned and fired to prevent them from falling into Confederate hands. In June 1865, four 24-pounder howitzers and two rifled, steel 12-pounders were salvaged from the hulk of Tawah.

== See also ==
- Anaconda Plan
