= USS Paw Paw =

Gunboat of the United States Navy

History

United States
- Ordered: as Fanny
- Acquired: 9 April 1863
- Commissioned: 25 July 1863
- Decommissioned: 1 July 1865
- Fate: sold, 17 August 1865

General characteristics
- Displacement: 175 tons
- Length: 120 ft (37 m)
- Beam: 34 ft (10 m)
- Draft: 6 ft (1.8 m)
- Depth of hold: 3 ft 10 in (1.17 m)
- Propulsion: steam engine; center wheel-propelled
- Speed: 4 knots (7.4 km/h; 4.6 mph)
- Armament: six 24-pounder howitzers; two 30-pounder Parrott Rifles

USS Paw Paw was a steamer acquired by the Union Navy during the American Civil War. She was used by the Union Navy as a convoy and patrol vessel on Confederate waterways.

== Service history ==
Fanny, a wooden, center-wheel steamer formerly named St. Charles, was purchased by the Navy at Chicago, Illinois, 9 April 1863 from J. Van Vartwick; arrived Cairo, Illinois, from St. Joseph, Missouri. 13 April 1863 for conversion to a "tinclad" gunboat; renamed Paw Paw 12 May 1863, designated gunboat No. 31 on 19 June 1863; and commissioned 25 July 1863, Acting Master Augustus F. Thompson in command. Paw Paw patrolled the upper Mississippi River protecting Union communication and supply bases from guerrilla attacks. She struck a snag and sank in Walnut Bend 6 August 1863, but was pumped out and raised by steam pump boat Champion No. 5. After repairs at Cairo, Illinois, she resumed patrol duty. From 10 October to 13 December, she supported General William Tecumseh Sherman's operations on the Tennessee River. In acknowledging the arrival of the gunboats, General Sherman wrote Admiral David Dixon Porter:

Of course we will get along together elegantly. All I have, he (Lt. Comdr. S. L. Phelps, the senior naval officer on the Tennessee River) can command, and I know the same feeling pervades every sailor's and soldier's heart. We are as one.

Sherman's confidence was well founded. The joint effort solidified the Union's position in the South's interior and prepared for Sherman's drive on Atlanta, Georgia, and ultimate thrust to the sea. Through the end of the war, Paw Paw remained active in the Mississippi Squadron maintaining Union control of the vast river system which acted as the nerves and sinews of the South. Paw Paw decommissioned at Mound City, Illinois, 1 July 1865 and was sold at public auction there to Sol. A. Silver 17 August 1865.
