= Eastport, Mississippi =

- Unincorporated community
- Location of Eastport, Mississippi Eastport, Mississippi (the United States)
- Coordinates: 34°53′08″N 88°06′02″W
- Country: United States
- State: Mississippi
- County: Tishomingo
- Established: c. 1838
- Elevation: 436 ft (133 m)
- Time zone: UTC-6 (Central (CST))
  - Summer (DST): UTC-5 (CDT)
- GNIS feature ID: 669629

Eastport is an unincorporated community in Tishomingo County, Mississippi, United States. During the 1840s and 1850s, Eastport became an important river port and boasted a population of 2,000 and many businesses. In 1857, the railroad missed Eastport and the townspeople began moving to nearby Iuka. During the American Civil War, the town again became an important river port, but by the 1890s the post office closed. When the Tennessee River was dammed to create Pickwick Lake in the 1930s, the old town was submerged. Eastport still exists as a small community with a marina.

== Geography ==
Eastport is located northeast of Iuka at the end of County Road 956, which is also called Eastport Road. The community is located on the west side of Bear Creek where it flows into the Tennessee River.

== History ==
Tishomingo County was established in 1836 after the Chickasaw Cession. Because it had access to the Tennessee River and the Natchez Trace, Eastport soon became a major trading post. Steamboats plying the Tennessee River docked there to bring goods in and out of northern Mississippi. By 1838 Eastport was chartered and it soon became one of the most wealthy towns in the area. During the 1850s, as many as six steamboats per day stopped at the town's docks. The town's population may have reached 2,000 with a post office, many businesses, Baptist and Methodist churches, a Masonic lodge, a hotel, and a girls school. The turning point came in 1857 when the town's leaders rejected an offer to run the Memphis and Charleston Railroad through Eastport. Instead, the new railroad went through Iuka and many townspeople soon relocated there, some even moving their houses. By 1860, the town was already fading away. In 1862 during the Civil War, Federal gunboats shelled the town. By the 1890s, Eastport lost its post office and its last few businesses. When the Pickwick Dam was built in the 1930s, the old town was inundated by the river. The small present-day community includes a marina.
