= USS Elfin (1864) =

Gunboat of the United States Navy

History

United States
- Ordered: as W. C. Mann
- Laid down: date unknown
- Launched: date unknown
- Acquired: February 23, 1864
- In service: (circa) February 1864
- Out of service: November 4, 1864
- Stricken: 1864 (est.)
- Fate: Destroyed in combat; November 4, 1864

General characteristics
- Displacement: 192 tons
- Length: 155 ft (47 m)
- Beam: 31 ft (9.4 m)
- Depth of hold: 4 ft 4 in (1.32 m)
- Propulsion: steam engine
- Speed: not known
- Complement: 50
- Armament: eight 24-pounder howitzers

The first USS Elfin was a light draft gunboat acquired by the Union Navy during the American Civil War. She was used by the Union Navy as a patrol vessel on Confederate waterways.

She was purchased as W. C. Mann by Admiral David Dixon Porter at Cincinnati, Ohio, February 23, 1864, and placed under the command of Acting Master A. F. Thompson.

== Assigned to the Mississippi Squadron ==
Assigned to the Mississippi Squadron, she cruised in the 7th District between Caledonia and Mound City, Illinois, for a month, then took up duty in the 9th District extending from Cairo, Illinois, to the head of the Tennessee River.

== Elfin destroyed in combat with Confederate shore batteries ==
On November 4, 1864 Elfin was operating with USS Tawah and USS Key West in the Tennessee and Cumberland Rivers. After a severe engagement of several hours with heavy Confederate shore batteries it was considered impossible to save the three vessels, and they were burned to prevent capture.
