= Johnsonville, Tennessee =

Destroyed town in Tennessee

Johnsonville was a town in Humphreys County, Tennessee. During the American Civil War, the town was a depot for the Union Army and the site of the Battle of Johnsonville. The town was destroyed by the creation of the Kentucky Dam and the subsequent flooding of the Tennessee River in 1944. Today, the site is managed by the state of Tennessee as Johnsonville State Historic Park.

At the time of its destruction, many of its residents moved to the current site of New Johnsonville, which was incorporated in 1949.
