= USS Walke =

Three ships in the United States Navy have been named for Rear Admiral Henry A. Walke.

- USS Walke (DD-34) was a Paulding-class destroyer, launched in 1910 and decommissioned in 1919 after service in World War I.
- USS Walke (DD-416) was a Sims-class destroyer, launched in 1939 and sunk in battle on 15 November 1942.
- USS Walke (DD-723) was an Allen M. Sumner-class destroyer, launched in 1943 and decommissioned in 1970.
