= USS Lafayette (1848) =

Side wheel steamer

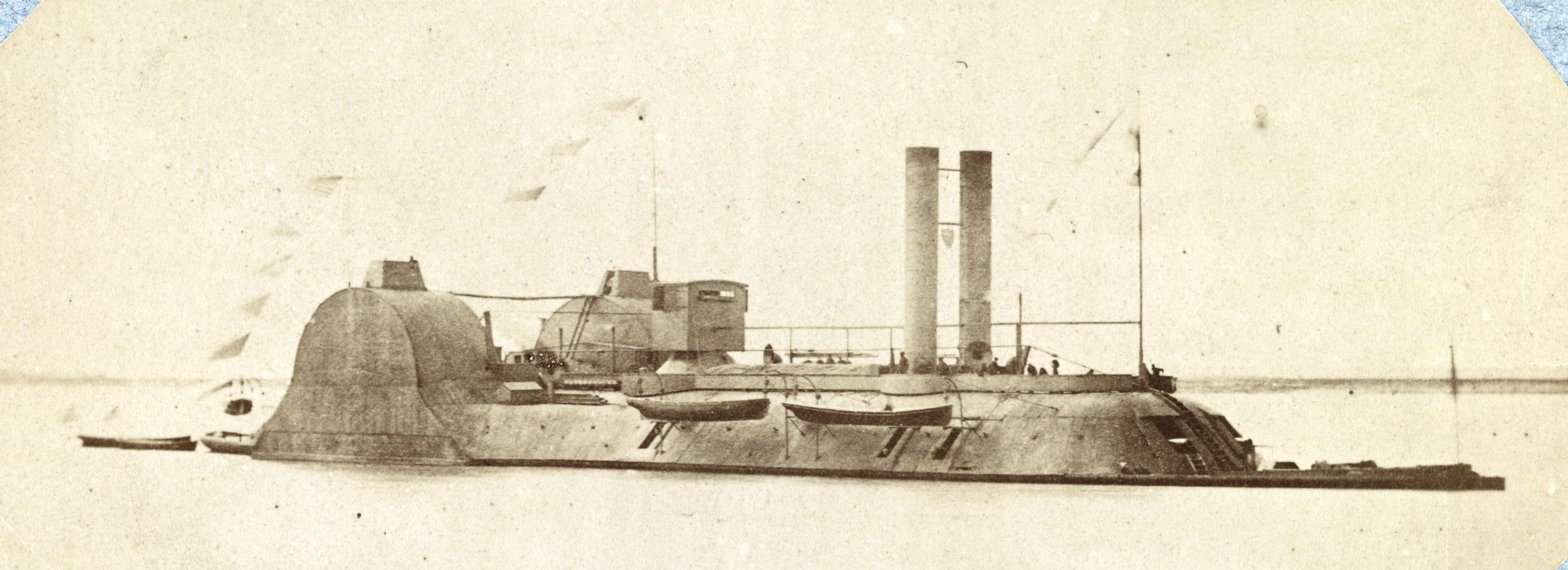
- USS Lafayette

History

United States
- Name: USS Lafayette
- Laid down: 1848
- Acquired: by purchase, 18 May 1862
- Commissioned: 27 February 1863
- Decommissioned: 23 July 1865
- Fate: Sold, 28 March 1866

General characteristics
- Type: Ironclad ram
- Displacement: 1,193 long tons (1,212 t)
- Length: 280 ft (85 m)
- Beam: 45 ft (14 m)
- Draft: 8 ft (2.4 m)
- Propulsion: Steam engine
- Speed: 4 knots (7.4 km/h; 4.6 mph)
- Armament: 2 × 11 in (280 mm) Dahlgren smoothbore guns; 4 × 9 in (230 mm) Dahlgren smoothbore guns; 2 × 100-pounder Parrott rifle guns

The first USS Lafayette was a side wheel steamer, converted to an ironclad ram, in the United States Navy during the American Civil War.

Lafayette was built at St. Louis, Missouri, in 1848 as Aleck Scott (often spelled Alick Scott). She was purchased by the War Department as Fort Henry on 18 May 1862 for use in the western flotilla. She was converted to an ironclad ram at St. Louis by Edward Hartt. Renamed Lafayette on 8 September 1862, she was transferred to the Navy with the entire western flotilla by executive order on 1 October 1862. She was commissioned at Cairo, Illinois, 27 February 1863, with Captain Henry A. Walke in command.

== Service history ==
=== Battle of Vicksburg, April–July 1863 ===
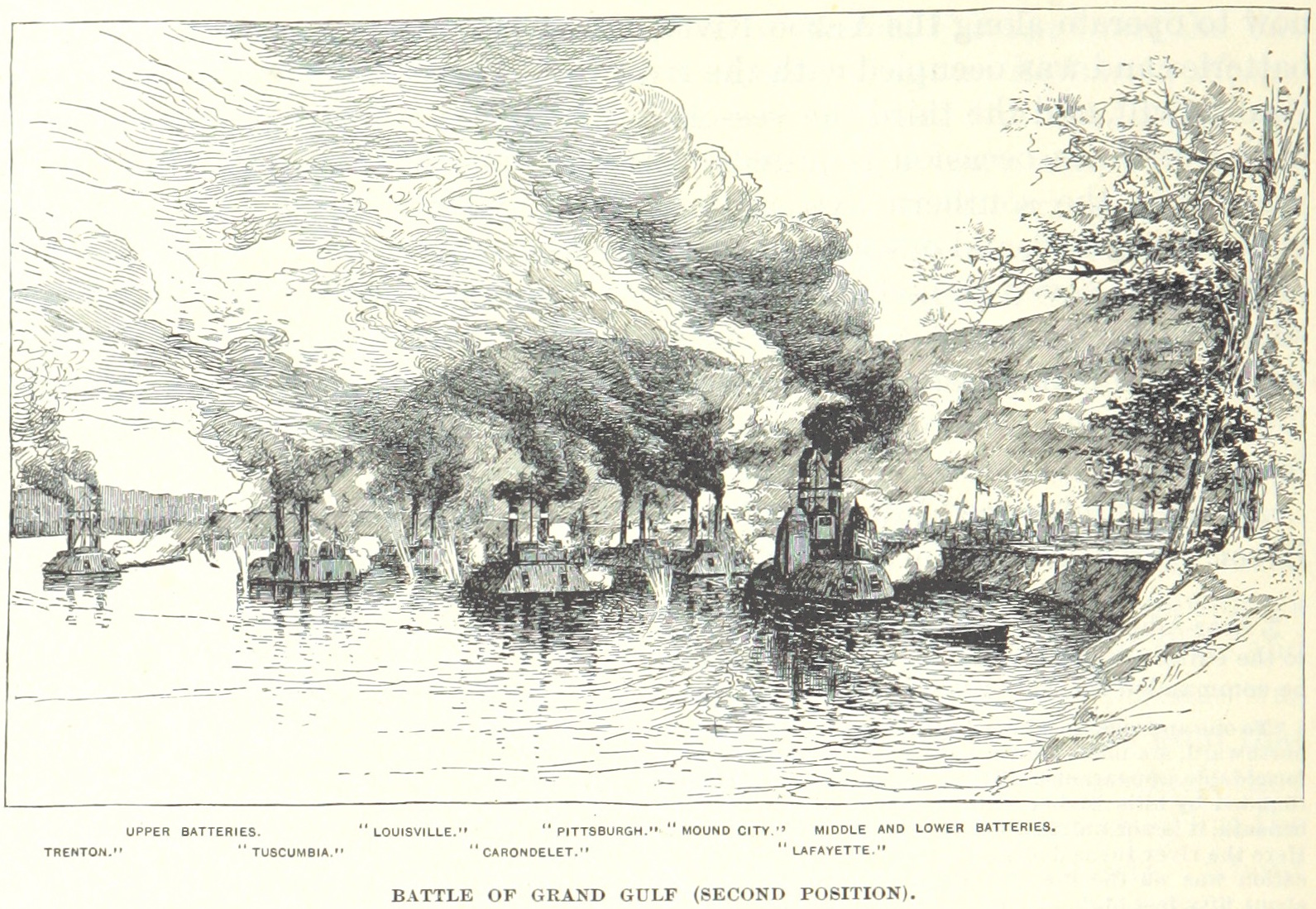
Battle of Grand Gulf second position

The new ram joined Rear Admiral David Dixon Porter's Mississippi Squadron above Vicksburg in time for the famous dash on 16 April 1863 past the deadly batteries which protected the vital Confederate fortress. The gunboats engaged the southern guns as they shepherded Army transports through the gauntlet to New Carthage. Ram General Sterling Price was lashed to the starboard side of Lafayette for the passage. The ships were covered with heavy logs and bales of wet hay, which proved to be an excellent defense. Each ship, except Benton, also towed a coal barge. Lafayette, hampered by the ship lashed to her side, received nine "effective" shots through her casemate and had her coal barge sunk. Although under fire for 2 1/2 hours, all ships of the squadron were ready for service within half an hour after the passage. The successful steaming of the squadron past the heavy batteries contributed to the early seizure of Grand Gulf, the eventual fall of Vicksburg itself, and ultimately the conquest of the entire Mississippi River.

Five days later Porter, in Lafayette, reconnoitered the Confederate works at Grand Gulf. He found a "strong fort" under construction and shelled the workers out. When Confederate steamer Charm attempted to land supplies for the fort the Union gunboats drove her back up the Big Black River. By the 24th, Porter had stationed his gunboats so that they commanded the upper battery at Grand Gulf and closed off the mouth of the Big Black River.

On the 29th Porter's ships engaged the heavy Confederate works at Grand Gulf, which, the admiral acknowledged, "were very formidable." In the 5 1/2-hour battle, the gunboats silenced the lower batteries but could succeed in stopping the fire from the upper forts only "for a short time." Meanwhile, Army transports passed safely below the batteries. Though Benton, Tuscumbia, and Pittsburgh were "pretty much cut up" in the engagement, the expedition was successful, and the net result was summed up by Porter, "We are now in a position to make a landing where the general [Grant] pleases." The following night Ulysses S. Grant took advantage of this mobility and ferried his troops across the Mississippi and landed them at Bruinsburg for lightning operations to isolate Vicksburg from reinforcements.

On 3 May Porter once again moved his gunboats against the Confederate batteries, but the southerners, finding their position totally untenable after Grant had taken his army into the country back of Grand Gulf, had evacuated. The great land-sea pincer could now close on Vicksburg. As Porter reported to Secretary of the Navy Gideon Welles, "...the Navy holds the door to Vicksburg."

Porter departed Grand Gulf with his gunboat squadron and rendezvoused that evening with the Farragut fleet at the mouth of the Red River. He preceded up the river the next day with Benton, Lafayette, Pittsburg, General Sterling Price, rams Switzerland, and Ivy. Estrella and Arizona joined en route. The evening of 5 May the ships arrived at Fort DeRussy, "a powerful casemated work" which the Confederates had recently evacuated in the face of the naval threat. Porter pushed past a heavy obstruction in the river and proceeded to Alexandria, Louisiana, which he occupied on the morning of the 7th. Subsequently, turning the town over to Army troops and unable to continue upriver because of the low water, Porter's force returned to Fort DeRussy and partially destroyed it.

As the Union noose around Vicksburg tightened, Lafayette steamed up and down the river gathering information and dispersing Confederate defensive works. With Pittsburg she shelled Simmesport, Louisiana, 4 June, forcing the defenders to abandon strong riverside positions. The gunboats then returned to the mouth of the Red River to resume blockade duty. Exactly a month later, on Independence Day, Vicksburg surrendered, ending a long and valiant siege.

=== Summer 1863 ===
During the summer and fall Lafayette, with other Union ships, patrolled the river protecting Federal communications. On 29 September she and Kenwood arrived at Morganza, Louisiana, on Bayou Fordeche, to support troops under Major General Napoleon J. T. Dana. There more than 400 Union troops recently had been captured in an engagement with Confederates under Brig. Gen. Thomas Green. The Union ships deterred the Confederates from attacking the smaller force of General Dana, demonstrating the ability of gunboats to vastly strengthen otherwise relatively weak ground forces.

=== Red River Campaign, 1864 ===
The Mississippi Squadron's next major operation took the gunboats up the Red River to open the two-month campaign aimed at obtaining a lodgment across the border in Texas. Eastport led the way on 12 March 1864, followed by ironclads Essex, Ozark, Osage and Neosho, and wooden steamers Lafayette, Choctaw, Fort Hindman, and Cricket.

When they reached the obstructions which the southerners had taken five months to build below Fort DeRussy, "...our energetic sailors," Porter observed, "with hard work opened a passage in a few hours." Eastport and Neosho passed through and commenced bombarding Fort DeRussy as the Union troops began their assault on the works; by the 14th it was in Union hands. Porter wrote: "The surrender of the forts at Point DeRussy is of much more importance than I at first supposed. The rebels had depended on that point to stop any advance of Army or Navy...."

On the 15th, after ordering Benton and Essex to remain at Fort DeRussy to support the Army detachment destroying the works, Porter convoyed the main body of troops up the Red River toward Alexandria. The Union ships reached Alexandria the next morning and a landing party occupied the town and awaited the arrival of Major General Nathaniel Prentiss Banks' army, delayed by heavy rains. Slowed by low water and obstructions, Porter pushed his vessels up the river. At Grand Encore he left the heavier gunboats behind, including Lafayette, and continued up stream 7 April with three ironclads and three wooden steamers to meet General Banks at Shreveport, Louisiana. Three days later they were stopped at Springfield Landing by a huge steamer, New Falls City, sunk athwart the channel. Before this formidable obstruction could be removed, word arrived that General Banks had been decisively defeated in the Battle of Sabine Cross Roads near Grand Encore and was in headlong retreat. Porter had no choice but to withdraw. Falling water and increasing Confederate fire from the riverbank strained the seamanship and ingenuity of the Union sailors in their desperate struggle to avoid being trapped above the Alexandria Rapids.

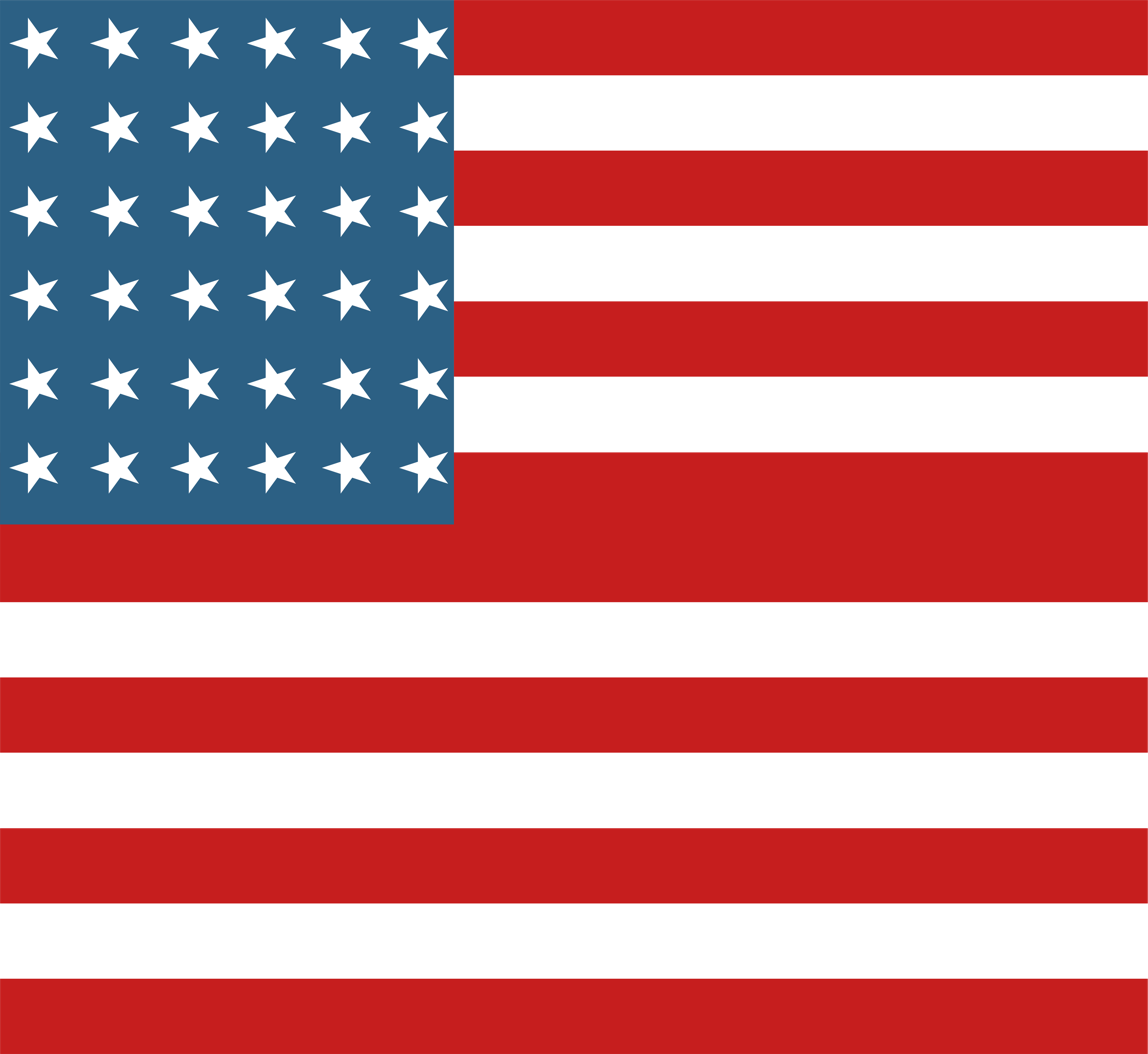
Ship's flag, 1865

After returning to the Mississippi, ships of the squadron were constantly occupied with safeguarding river transportation from southern attack. On 16 May sidewheeler General Sterling Price engaged a Confederate battery which had fired on transport steamer Mississippi near Ratliff's Landing, Mississippi. Lafayette and General Bragg converged upon the battery, and the three heavy steamers forced the Confederate gunners back from the river, enabling the transport to proceed.

After the war, Lafayette decommissioned on 23 July 1865 and was laid up at New Orleans until sold there on 28 March 1866.

== See also ==
Media related to USS Lafayette (ship, 1848) at Wikimedia Commons

- Seth Ledyard Phelps (commander in Mississippi River Squadron)
