= Mississippi River campaigns =

Series of military actions by the Union Army

The Mississippi River campaigns, within the Western and Trans-Mississippi Theater of the American Civil War, were a series of military actions by the Union Army during which Union troops, helped by Union Navy gunboats and river ironclads, took control of the Cumberland River, the Tennessee River, and the Mississippi River, a main north–south avenue of transport.

The campaign on and along the Mississippi River started in February 1862 with Union forces pushing down from Cairo, Illinois into disputed territory in Missouri and Kentucky and Confederate territory in Tennessee. It ended with the surrender of the last Confederate strongholds on the Mississippi River, Vicksburg, Mississippi on July 4, 1863, and of Port Hudson, Louisiana on July 9, 1863. Flag Officer Foote initially commanded the Union naval forces, which were later led by Farragut and Porter. Union ground forces were primarily under the command of General Grant.

== Background ==
In July 1863, the Trans-Mississippi Department of the Confederate States of America was split from the Confederate States east of the river when the Union gained control of the entire Mississippi River. This cut the main east–west artery of transportation for the South, depriving the rest of the Confederacy of men, food and other supplies from the Confederate States west of the river. While not commonly lumped together under this designation, the river campaigns were undertaken mainly for reasons found in Union General-in-Chief Winfield Scott's 1861 Anaconda Plan. Scott proposed to defeat the Confederacy largely through blockade of ports and control of rivers leading to the economic 'strangulation' of the Confederacy, which he hoped would prevent a large number of bloody land battles.

The original Union Army expedition to control the Cumberland and Tennessee Rivers was under the overall command Major General Henry W. Halleck although Brigadier General Ulysses S. Grant commanded the forces in the field. Flag officer Andrew H. Foote commanded the Navy's squadrons. The Vicksburg and Port Hudson campaigns were commanded by Major Generals Grant and Nathaniel P. Banks, respectively while the Mississippi River Squadron was commanded by then Rear Admiral David Farragut from the south and Flag Officer David Dixon Porter from the north.

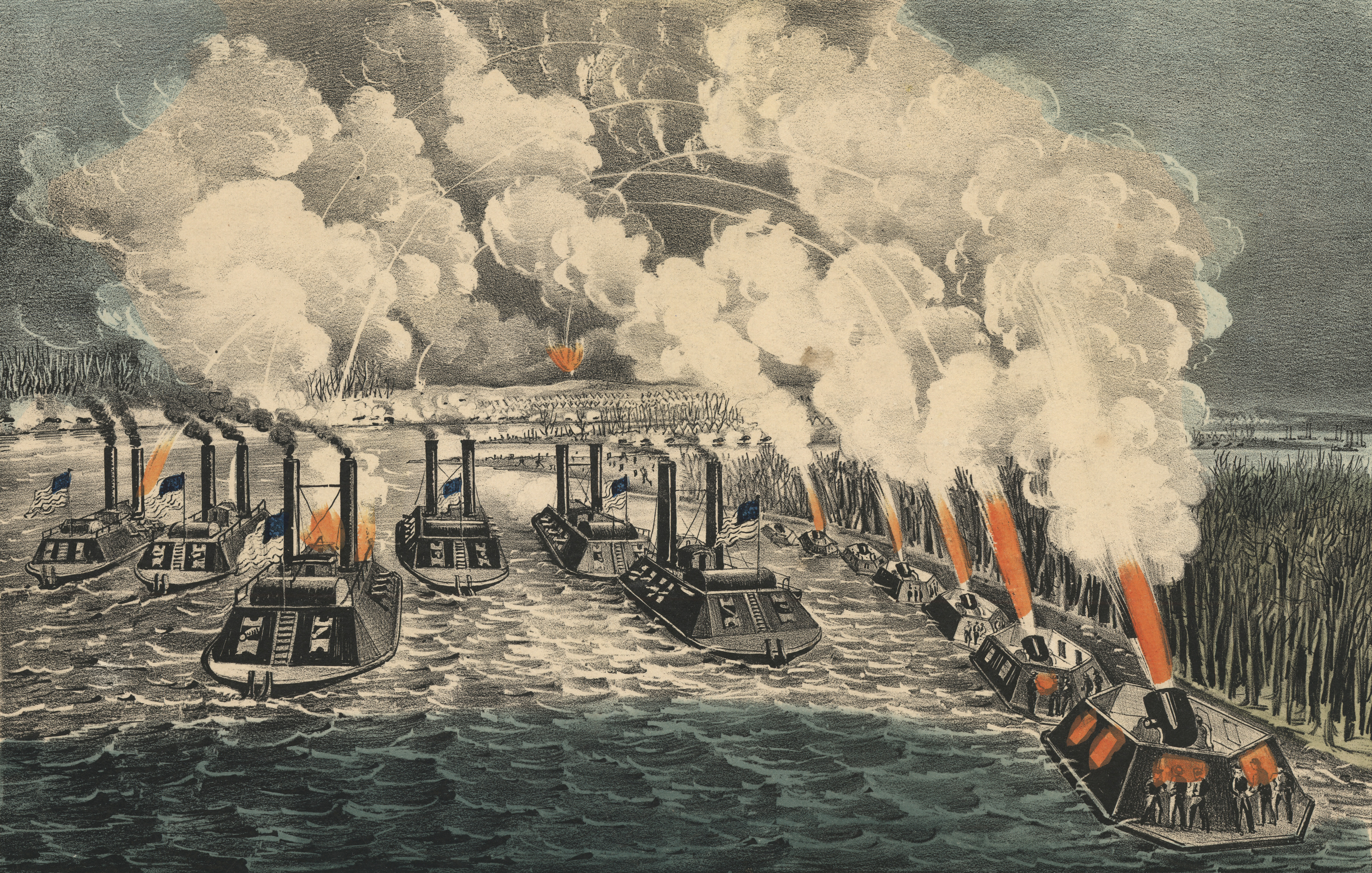
1862 bombardment of Island Number Ten

== Practical elements of warfare on the Mississippi ==
Armored paddle steamers played an important role in the Mississippi River campaign, but the campaign was a Union Army undertaking. The ships were under Army command and were used as army transports and floating gun stations rather than independent warships. Most were either converted paddle steamers or purpose-built gunboats that had never seen the sea. Because of this, the Mississippi River Squadron quickly became known as the Brown-water navy. This was a reference to the brown, muddy water of the Mississippi, as compared to the deep blue commonly associated with the sea. The only exception was at the Siege of Vicksburg where the army, marching downstream, met up with the Union Navy under Rear Admiral David Farragut sailing upstream and the two combined their forces for an all-out land-and-sea shelling of the town.

The river campaigns saw the first practical use of river gunboats and river ironclads, in particular the City-class ironclads, ironclad paddle steamers built by James B. Eads in St. Louis and Cairo, Illinois. It also saw the use of sea mines, which at that time were called torpedoes, a term applied to self-propelled warheads only later, torpedo rams and a brief Confederate experiment in deploying a casemate ironclad, the CSS Arkansas, in a river defense role.

== Notable engagements ==
Important battles in the Tennessee and Cumberland Rivers campaign were the capture of Fort Henry and Fort Donelson, where the Union forces were under the direct command of Brigadier General U.S. Grant, who reported to Major General Halleck, and the naval forces of the Western Gunboat Flotilla, predecessor of the Mississippi River Squadron, were led by Flag Officer Andrew H. Foote. Key military actions along the Mississippi River included the Island No. 10, the First Battle of Memphis, and the Siege of Vicksburg

== See also ==
- Mississippi River in the American Civil War
- Seth Ledyard Phelps (commander of various gunboat fleets)
- Charles Henry Davis (replaced Admiral Foote as flag officer of Mississippi Squadron)

== Sources ==
- Arnold, James R. Grant Wins the War: Decision at Vicksburg. New York: John Wiley & Sons, Inc., 1997. ISBN 978-0-471-15727-4.
- Ballard, Michael B. Grant at Vicksburg: The General and the Siege. Carbondale, IL: Southern Illinois University Press, 2013. ISBN 978-0-8093-3240-3.
- Ballard, Michael B. Vicksburg, The Campaign that Opened the Mississippi. Chapel Hill: University of North Carolina Press, 2004. ISBN 978-0-8078-2893-9.
- Bearss, Edwin C. The Campaign for Vicksburg. 3 vols. Dayton, OH: Morningside House, 1985. ISBN 978-0-89029-312-6.
- Beck, Brandon H. Holly Springs: Van Dorn, The CSS Arkansas and The Raid That Saved Vicksburg. Charleston, SC: The History Press, 2011. ISBN 978-1-60949-049-2.
- Carter III, Samuel. The Final Fortress: The Campaign for Vicksburg 1862-1863. New York, St. Martin's Press, 1980. ISBN 978-0-312-83926-0.
- Catton, Bruce. The Centennial History of the Civil War. Vol. 3, Never Call Retreat. Garden City, NY: Doubleday, 1965. ISBN 978-0-671-46990-0.
- Cooling, Benjamin Franklin. Forts Henry and Donelson: The Key to the Confederate Heartland. Knoxville: University of Tennessee Press, 1987. ISBN 978-0-87049-538-0.
- Daniel, Larry J. and Lynn N. Bock. Island No. 10: Struggle for the Mississippi Valley. Tuscaloosa: The University of Alabama Press, 1996. ISBN 978-0-8173-0816-2.
- Eicher, David J. The Longest Night: A Military History of the Civil War. New York: Simon & Schuster, 2001. ISBN 978-0-684-84944-7.
- Esposito, Vincent J. (1959). West Point Atlas of American Wars. Vol. 1: 1689–1900 (1st ed.). New York: Frederick A. Praeger Publishers. OCLC 5890637.
- Foote, Shelby. The Civil War: A Narrative. Vol. 2, Fredericksburg to Meridian. New York: Random House, 1958. ISBN 978-0-394-41951-0.
- Gott, Kendall D. Where the South Lost the War: An Analysis of the Fort Henry-Fort Donelson Campaign, February 1862. Mechanicsburg, PA: Stackpole Books, 2011. ISBN 978-0-8117-3160-7. Originally published 2003.
- Grant, Ulysses S. Personal Memoirs of U. S. Grant. 2 vols. Charles L. Webster & Company, 1885–86. ISBN 0-914427-67-9.
- Hamilton, James. The Battle of Fort Donelson. South Brunswick, NJ: T. Yoseloff, 1968. OCLC 2579774.
- Joiner, Gary D. Mr. Lincoln's Brown Water Navy: The Mississippi Squadron. Lanham, MD: Rowman & Littlefield Publishers, Inc., 2007. ISBN 978-0-7425-5098-8.
- Kennedy, Frances H., ed. The Civil War Battlefield Guide. 2nd ed. Boston: Houghton Mifflin Co., 1998. ISBN 978-0-395-74012-5.
- Kerby, Robert L. Kirby Smith's Confederacy: The Trans-Mississippi South, 1863– 1865. Tuscaloosa and London: The University of Alabama Press, Reprint. Originally published New York: Columbia University Press, 1972. ISBN 978-0-8173-0546-8.
- Korn, Jerry, and the Editors of Time-Life Books. War on the Mississippi: Grant's Vicksburg Campaign. Alexandria, VA: Time-Life Books, 1985. ISBN 0-8094-4744-4.
- Knight, James R. The Battle of Fort Donelson: No Terms but Unconditional Surrender. Charleston, SC: The History Press, 2011. ISBN 978-1-60949-129-1.
- McPherson, James M. Battle Cry of Freedom: The Civil War Era. Oxford History of the United States. New York: Oxford University Press, 1988. ISBN 978-0-19-503863-7.
- McPherson, James M. War on the Waters: The Union & Confederate Navies, 1861-1865. Chapel Hill: University of North Carolina Press, 2012. ISBN 978-0-8078-3588-3.
- Nevin, David, and the Editors of Time-Life Books. The Road to Shiloh: Early Battles in the West. Alexandria, VA: Time-Life Books, 1983. ISBN 0-8094-4716-9.
- Shea, William L. and Terrence J. Winschel. Vicksburg is the Key: The Struggle for the Mississippi River. Lincoln, NE: University of Nebraska Press, 2003. ISBN 978-0-8032-9344-1.
- Simon, John Y., ed. Papers of Ulysses S. Grant: January 8 - March 31, 1862. Vol. 4. Carbondale: Southern Illinois University Press, 1972. ISBN 0-8093-0507-0.
- Simon, John Y., ed. The Papers of Ulysses S. Grant. Vol. 8, April 1 – July 6, 1863. Carbondale: Southern Illinois University Press, 1979. ISBN 0-8093-0884-3.
- Smith, Jean Edward. Grant. New York: Simon & Schuster, 2001. ISBN 0-684-84927-5.
- Smith, Timothy B. Champion Hill: Decisive Battle for Vicksburg. El Dorado Hills, CA: Savas Beatie, 2004. ISBN 978-1-932714-00-5.
- Taafe, Stephen R. Commanding Lincoln's Navy: Union Naval Leadership During the Civil War. Annapolis, MD: Naval Institute Press, 2009. ISBN 978-1-59114-855-5.
- Tucker, Spencer C. Blue & Gray Navies: The Civil War Afloat. Annapolis, MD: Naval Institute Press, 2006. ISBN 978-1-59114-882-1.
- Winschel, Terrence J. Triumph & Defeat: The Vicksburg Campaign. New York: Savas Beatie LLC, 2004. ISBN 978-1-932714-04-3. First published Campbell, CA, Savas Publishing Co., 1999.
- Winters, John D. The Civil War in Louisiana. Baton Rouge: Louisiana State University Press, 1963. ISBN 978-0-8071-0834-5.
- Woodworth, Steven E. Nothing but Victory: The Army of the Tennessee, 1861–1865. New York: Alfred A. Knopf, 2005. ISBN 978-0-375-41218-9.
- Woodworth, Steven E., and Charles D. Grear. The Vicksburg Campaign, March 29–May 18, 1863. Carbondale, IL: Southern Illinois University Press, 2013. ISBN 978-0-8093-3269-4.
