= USS Eastport (1862) =

Gunboat of the United States Navy

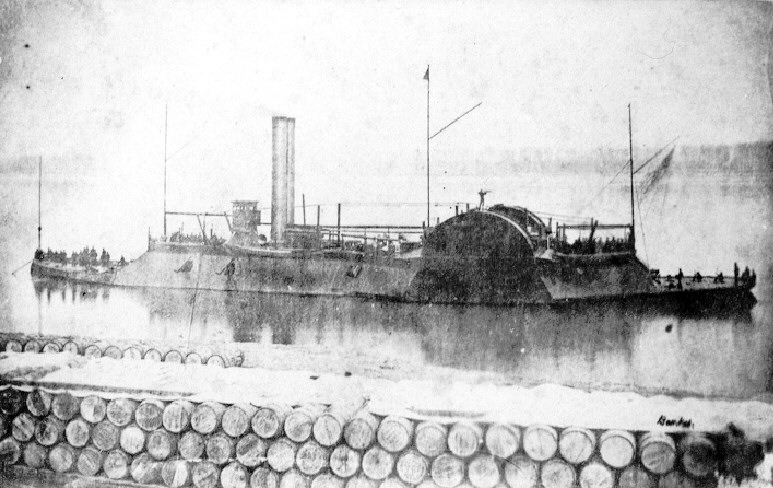
- Eastport in 1863

History

United States
- Laid down: date unknown
- Launched: date unknown
- Acquired: 1 October 1862
- In service: 1 October 1862
- Captured: by Union Navy forces; 7 February 1862
- Fate: sunk by a mine; 15 April 1864

General characteristics
- Displacement: 700 tons
- Length: 280 ft (85 m)
- Beam: not known
- Draught: 6 ft 3 in (1.91 m)
- Propulsion: steam engine
- Speed: not known
- Complement: not known
- Armament: 2 × 12-pounder guns; 4 × 32-pounder guns; 2 × 30-pounder guns
- Armour: ironclad

USS Eastport was a steamer captured by the Union Navy during the American Civil War. She was used by the Union Navy as a convoy and patrol vessel on Confederate waterways.

== Captured Confederate schooner used as Union Navy patrol vessel ==
Eastport, a partially completed ironclad, was captured from the Confederates on 7 February 1862 at Cerro Gordo, Tennessee, by the Union gunboats Conestoga, Tyler and Lexington, commanded by Captain Seth Ledyard Phelps.

== Converted into an ironclad ram for use by the Union Army ==
Converted at Cairo, Illinois, into an ironclad ram for use by the Union Army, she sailed from that port late in August under the command of Captain Phelps for duty in the Mississippi River between Island No. 10 and the mouth of the White River, Arkansas. She was back at Cairo, Illinois, for repairs when, on 1 October 1862, Eastport and the other vessels of the Western Flotilla were turned over to the Navy and joined the Mississippi Squadron.

== Assigned to the Navy's Mississippi Squadron ==
Eastport sailed from Cairo to join her squadron near Vicksburg, Mississippi, but struck bottom on 2 February 1863 and returned to Cairo for repairs. She stood down the river on 19 June for Helena, Arkansas, and served the rest of her career in the Mississippi River and its tributaries as a convoy and patrol vessel, helping capture over 14,000 bales of cotton. On 5 March 1864, she dropped down to the mouth of the Red River for the joint Army-Navy expedition.

== Eastport strikes a mine ==
She passed through the obstructions below Fort De Russy, in whose capture she joined, then continued up the Red River above Grand Ecore until 5 April, when she rounded to and stood down again. On 15 April 1864, she suffered a torpedo (mine) explosion. Despite every effort to bring her out, she had to be destroyed on the 26th to prevent her falling into Confederate hands. Captain Phelps placed 3,000 pounds (1,400 kg) of gunpowder in her hold and blew the vessel into fragments.

== See also ==
- Blockade runners of the American Civil War
- List of ships of the Confederate States Navy

== Bibliography ==
- Bisbee, Saxon T. (2018). Engines of Rebellion: Confederate Ironclads and Steam Engineering in the American Civil War. Tuscaloosa, Alabama: University of Alabama Press. ISBN 978-0-81731-986-1.
- Canney, Donald L. (2015). The Confederate Steam Navy 1861-1865. Atglen, Pennsylvania: Schiffer Publishing. ISBN 978-0-7643-4824-2.
- Silverstone, Paul H. (2006). Civil War Navies 1855–1883. The U.S. Navy Warship Series. New York: Routledge. ISBN 0-415-97870-X.
- Still, William N. Jr. (1985) [1971]. Iron Afloat: The Story of the Confederate Armorclads. Columbia, South Carolina: University of South Carolina Press. ISBN 0-87249-454-3.
