= Stoddard =

Stoddard may refer to:

== Places ==
In the United States:

- Stoddard, Nebraska
- Stoddard, New Hampshire
- Stoddard, Wisconsin
- Stoddard County, Missouri

== Other uses ==
- Stoddard (surname)

== See also ==
- Stoddard-Dayton, the automobile
- Stoddard engine, a heat engine
- Stoddard-Hamilton Aircraft
- USS Stoddard (DD-566), U.S. Navy destroyer
- Stoddart, a surname
- White spirit, also known as Stoddard Solvent
