= Stoddard (surname) =

Stoddard is English Occupational surname meaning Standard Bearer. Notable people with the surname include:

- Stoddard (baseball), baseball player
- Andrew Stoddard, American politician
- Anna E. Stoddard (1852-1936), American writer, journalist, social reformer
- Arthur Francis Stoddard (1810-1882) carpet manufacturer and philanthropist
- Bob Stoddard (Robert Lyle, b. 1957), major league baseball pitcher from San Jose
- Charles Warren Stoddard (1843–1909), American author and traveler of the Pacific
- Christian Stoddard (born 2006), American archer
- Corinne Stoddard (b. 2001), American speedskater
- Elliott J. Stoddard (fl. 1919–1933), inventor of Stoddard engine
- Elizabeth Drew Stoddard née Barstow (1823–1902), American poet and novelist, wife of Richard Henry
- George Stoddard (1917–2009), American real-estate financier
- George D. Stoddard (1897–1981), American academic, President of the University of Illinois
- Harry Galpin Stoddard (1873–1969), businessman who became president of Wyman & Gordon
- Helen Gerrells Stoddard (1850–1940), American educator, temperance and suffrage activist
- Howard J. Stoddard (1901–1971), American banker
- Isaac T. Stoddard (1851–1914), American businessman
- James Stoddard (author) (fl. 1985–), American fantasy author
- James Stoddard (sailor) (born 1838, date of death unknown), American sailor and namesake of USS Stoddard (DD-566)
- John Lawson Stoddard (1850–1931), American writer of hymns and travelogues; father of Lothrop
- John W. Stoddard (1837–1917), American manufacturer of cars and farm tools
- Joshua C. Stoddard (1814–1902), American inventor of steam calliope
- Lavinia Stoddard (1787–1820), American poet, school founder
- Lothrop Stoddard (1883–1950), American white supremacist, son of John Lawson
- Malcolm Stoddard (b. 1948), British television actor
- Mark Stoddard (b. 1954), American voice actor
- Mary Stoddard (1852–1901), Scottish-born artist who spent twenty years in Australia
- Michael Stoddard, American geographer and namesake of the Stoddard unit of measurement
- Richard Henry Stoddard (1825–1903), American author and poet
- Robert Stoddard (musician) (fl. 1980s), punk rock singer and guitarist
- Robert Waring Stoddard (c. 1906–1984), former president of Wyman-Gordan and John Birch Society founder
- Seneca Ray Stoddard (1844–1917), American landscape photographer
- Solomon Stoddard (1643–1729), American Congregational preacher
- Sophia D. Stoddard née Sarah D. Hazen (d. 1891), American educator, a principal of Mount Holyoke
- Thomas Benton Stoddard (1800–1876), first mayor of La Crosse, Wisconsin; Wisconsin State Assembly and namesake of Stoddard, Wisconsin
- Tim Stoddard (b. 1953), major league baseball pitcher from Chicago
- Whitney Stoddard (1913-2003), prominent American art historian and educator

Fictional characters:

- Elizabeth Collins Stoddard, character in the television series Dark Shadows
