= Stodart =

Stodart is a surname. Notable people with the surname include:

- Robert Stodart (1748–1813), British piano maker
- William Stodart (1792–1838), British piano maker
- Anthony Stodart (1916–2003), Scottish politician
- Frank Stodart (1885–1944), Australian rules footballer
- James Stodart (1849–1922), Australian politician
- William Stodart (1904–1990), New Zealand rower
- Romeo Stodart (1977-Present ) Singer/Songwriter, Musician, Music Producer

== See also ==
- Stoddart
- Stoddard (disambiguation)
