= Dermott High School =

Location
- 525 East Speedway Street; Dermott, Arkansas 71638; United States
- 33°31′18″N 91°25′43″W

Information
- School type: Public comprehensive
- Status: Open
- School board: Dermott Board of Education
- School district: Dermott School District
- Superintendent: Kristi Ridgell
- CEEB code: 040615
- NCES School ID: 050517000239
- Principal: Kimberly Brown
- Teaching staff: 24.63 (on FTE basis)
- Grades: 7–12
- Enrollment: 144 (2023-2024)
- Student to teacher ratio: 5.85
- Education system: ADE Smart Core
- Classes offered: Regular, Advanced Placement (AP)
- Colors: Black and orange
- Athletics: Football, basketball, track and field
- Athletics conference: 2A Region 7 West (2012–14)
- Mascot: The Mighty Ram
- Team name: Dermott Rams
- Accreditation: ADE; AdvancED (1954–)
- Yearbook: The Ram's Horn
- Feeder schools: Dermott Elementary School (PK–6)
- Website: dermott.k12.ar.us

Dermott High School is an accredited public high school located in the community of Dermott, Arkansas, United States. It is the only high school administered by the Dermott School District, and is one of two public high schools based in Chicot County, Arkansas. The school has just over 200 students, in grades 7 through 12.

== History ==
In the summer of 1885, Dermott established its first public white school, which was used in the winter as a Black school. After its first year, various buildings were used until 1908, when the current school system was established, including a new elementary school. The original 1908 brick building was used until 1976.

In 1889, Isaac George Bailey co-founded a school for African Americans in Dermott. It was succeeded by Morris-Booker High School and Memorial College. Chicot County High School was a segregated high school for African Americans in the county. It closed with desegregation. Nobel Leftwich had served as its principal.

As part of a series of retrospective painting of Dermott, Larry D. Alexander painted Chicot County High School.

== Attendance boundary ==
In Chicot County, the school district (and therefore the high school) serves Dermott. A portion of the district extends into Desha County, where it serves Halley. Another portion extends into Drew County, where it includes Collins.

== Academics ==
The typical course of study follows the Smart Core curriculum developed by the Arkansas Department of Education (ADE). Students complete regular (core and elective) and career focus courses and exams, with optional Advanced Placement (AP) coursework and exams. Graduating students who complete Smart Core requirements and maintain a 3.5 Grade Point Average (GPA) or above are conferred as Honor Graduates.

Dermott is accredited by the ADE, and has been accredited by AdvancED since 1954.

== Extracurricular activities ==
The Dermott High School mascot and athletic emblem is the Ram with school colors of black and orange.

=== Athletics ===
For 2012–14, the Dermott Rams competed in interscholastic sporting activities within the 2A Classification from the 2A Region 7 West Conference administered by the Arkansas Activities Association. The Rams participate in boys' and girls' basketball and track and field.

- Football: Dermott has won the state football championships once, in 1947; Dermott no longer plays football.
- Track and field: In 1981, the Dermott boys' track team won the school's only state track and field championship.
- Basketball: The boys' basketball team has won four state championships (1986, 1989, 1991, and 1994). In 1986, Dermott's team achieved a 35–0 undefeated season as well as winning the state overall basketball championship, a now-defunct tournament played between each classification's state champion.

== Notable alumni ==
- Larry D. Alexander (Class of 1971) – artist and Christian author
- Bobby Crockett (Class of 1962) – professional football wide receiver
- Fred Haas (Class of 1933) – professional golfer; 1937 NCAA individual golf champion
