= Chicot County Training School =

- Formerly listed on the U.S. National Register of Historic Places
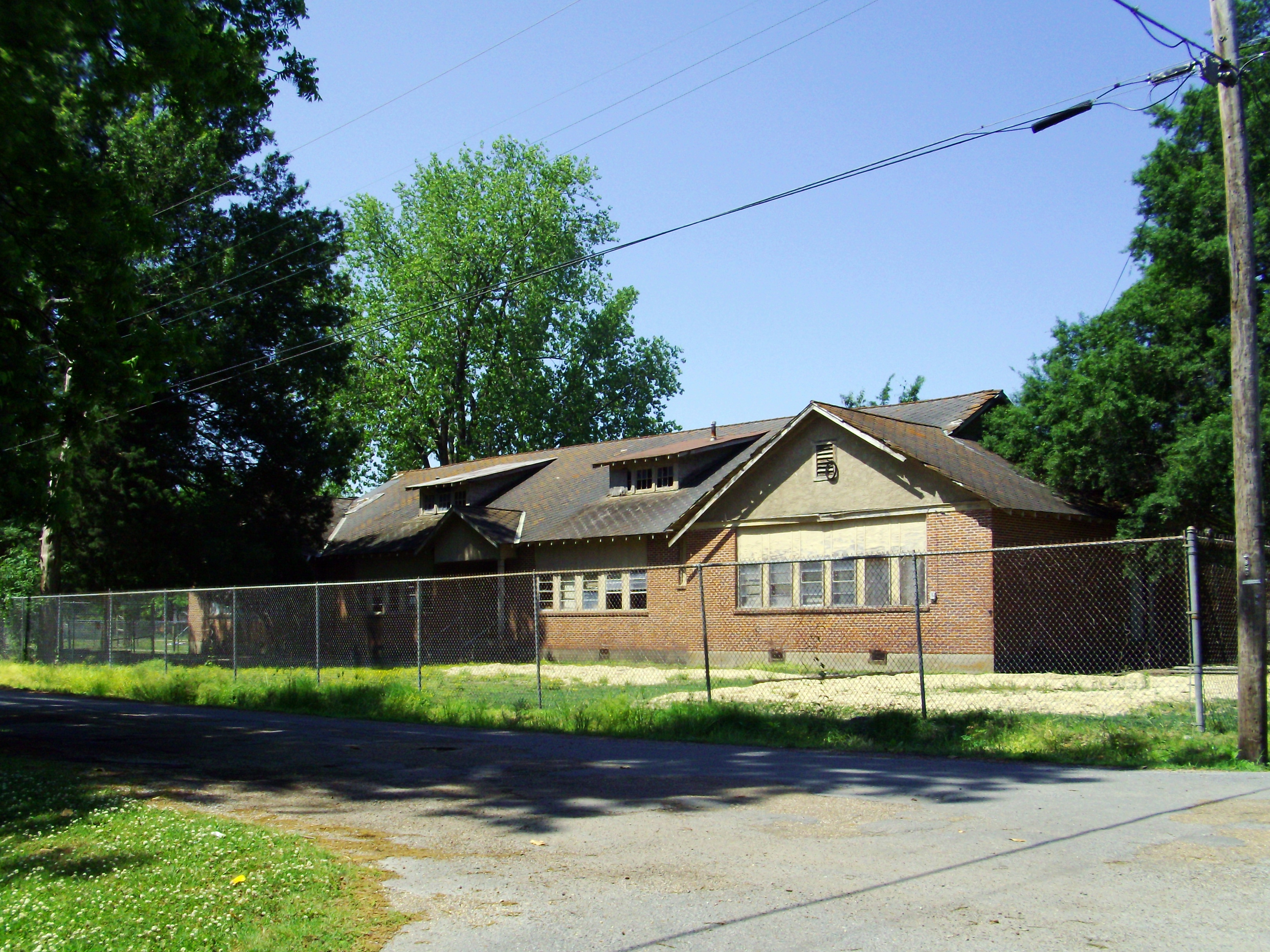

- Location within Arkansas Location within the United States
- Location: Jct. of Hazel and N. School St., Dermott, Arkansas
- Coordinates: 33°32′8″N 91°26′19″W
- Area: less than one acre
- Built: 1929
- Architectural style: Bungalow/craftsman
- NRHP reference No.: 04000490

Significant dates
- Added to NRHP: May 26, 2004
- Removed from NRHP: September 1, 2022

The Chicot County Training School was a historic school building at the corner of Hazel and North School Streets in Dermott, Arkansas. The single story H-shaped building was built in 1929 with funding support from the Rosenwald Fund, a major philanthropic effort to improve educational opportunities for African-Americans. The school was preceded by Dermott Baptist Industrial School, co-founded by Isaac George Bailey, and then Morris Booker High School and Memorial College. It was succeeded by Morris Booker Memorial College. The building was listed on the National Register of Historic Places in 2004. The school building collapsed and burned after being abandoned. It was delisted from the National Register in 2022.

== History ==
The building served as a public school facility until 1975, after which it was sold to Morris-Booker Memorial College, which was in 2004 using it as a Head Start facility.

== Architecture ==
The school building was similar to other schools of the period, with banks of windows providing plentiful light to its seven classrooms. Sometime in the 1940s an auditorium was added to the west side. The building was the second built for the training school with Rosenwald support; the first, a four-room building, was built in 1924 but has not survived.

The school building was significant as the only surviving Rosenwald-funded school in Chicot County. Its design was based on standard plans developed by Samuel Smith, an agent for the Rosenwald Fund who developed a plan book for various configurations of school buildings, to be used in the fund's work without necessating the need for an architect for each facility built. The design incorporated an "industrial" room, in which trades could be taught, and the building was sited according to Rosenwald recommendations for the best use of natural lighting.

== See also ==
- National Register of Historic Places listings in Chicot County, Arkansas
