= USS Marmora (1862) =

Gunboat of the United States Navy

- Marmora in the foreground

History

United States
- Name: USS Marmora
- Namesake: Variant spelling of Marmara, an island in the Sea of Marmara
- Builder: William Latta
- Completed: 1862
- Acquired: September 17, 1862
- Commissioned: October 21, 1862
- Decommissioned: July 7, 1865
- Fate: Sold, August 17, 1865

General characteristics
- Type: Sternwheel steamer
- Tonnage: 207 tons
- Length: 155 ft (47 m)
- Beam: 33 ft 5 in (10.19 m)
- Draft: 4 ft 6 in (1.37 m)
- Propulsion: 2× steam engines
- Speed: 6.9 knots (12.8 km/h; 7.9 mph)
- Armament: 2 × 24-pounder guns; 2 × 12-pounder rifled cannon (As commissioned)

USS Marmora was a sternwheel steamer that served in the Union Navy from 1862 to 1865, during the American Civil War. Built in 1862 at Monongahela, Pennsylvania, as a civilian vessel, she was purchased for military service on September 17 and converted into a tinclad warship. Commissioned on October 21, the vessel served on the Yazoo River beginning the next month. She encountered Confederate naval mines on the Yazoo on December 11, and was present the next day when the ironclad USS Cairo was sunk by two mines. After further service on the Yazoo during the Battle of Chickasaw Bayou in late December, Marmora was assigned in January 1863 to a fleet that was preparing to operate against Confederate Fort Hindman, but was not present when the fort surrendered on January 11.

From February to April, Marmora participated in the Yazoo Pass expedition, and in June burned and destroyed the settlements of Eunice and Gaines Landing, Arkansas, after Union vessels were fired on by Confederate troops. In August, the tinclad participated in some activities on the White River while the Little Rock campaign was beginning, and patrolled on the Mississippi River late that year. In February 1864, she participated in another movement up the Yazoo River, and fought in the Battle of Yazoo City on March 5. Continuing to serve on the Mississippi River, Marmora was declared surplus in May 1865 and was put in reserve status at Mound City, Illinois, the next month. On July 7, she was decommissioned, and was sold at public auction on August 17. Nothing further is known about Marmora after her sale.

== Construction and characteristics ==
Marmora was built in 1862 at the shipyard of William Latta in Monongahela, Pennsylvania. She was built for ship captain James McDonald, who had previously operated another ship with the same name. She was also known as the Marmora No. 2, and the name originated with the island of Marmara. She had a tonnage of 207 tons, was 155 feet (47 m) long, had a draft of 4 feet 6 inches (1.37 m) when "deeply loaded", and had a beam of 33 feet 5 inches (10.19 m). A sternwheel steamer, her paddle wheel was 20 feet (6.1 m) in diameter, with paddles that were 24 feet (7.3 m) long. Propulsion was provided by two steam engines, which had cylinder diameters of 15.25 inches (38.7 cm) and a stroke of 5 feet 6 inches (1.68 m). Steam was provided by two Watson and Monroe boilers. Each boiler had three 8-inch (20 cm) and three 11-inch (28 cm) flues. Marmora had a top speed of 6.9 knots (12.8 km/h; 7.9 mph), although this was reduced to 6 knots (11 km/h; 6.9 mph) when going upstream.

McDonald used Marmora several times, including transporting Union Army troops down the Kanawha River in August. At that time she was also in use for transporting passengers and freight, running between Pittsburgh, Pennsylvania, and Cincinnati, Ohio. With the Civil War ongoing, the Union Navy was seeking to increase the number of ships it operated, and the navy purchased Marmora for military use on September 17, at a cost of $21,000, (equivalent to $677,250 in 2025) from C. Brennan, William Nelson, and James McDonnell. The steamer was converted into a tinclad warship. For tinclad conversions in general, this was a process that involved arming the ship, installing a wooden casemate that was at least partially covered with thin iron armor, replacing the pilothouse with a new armored one, reinforcing decks and internal beams, and generally removing the texas. Tinclad warships were used to patrol rivers, protect and escort other vessels, and sometimes act as naval support for military actions.

Marmora was assigned the identification number 2; these numbers were painted onto the pilothouses of the tinclads beginning in June 1863. She was commissioned into the Union Navy on October 21, 1862, at Carondelet, St. Louis. Over the course of her military service, her armament varied. Initially, she was armed with two 12-pounder rifled cannons and two 24-pounder guns. In June 1864, four 24-pounder guns were added to her armament, which consisted of eight 24-pounder guns as of the following December. As of March 31, 1865, she was reported to have been armed with two 12-pounder guns and six 14-pounders. Along with USS Signal, Marmora was one of the first purpose-converted tinclads in the Union Navy.

== Service history ==
=== Vicksburg campaign ===
Marmora left Carondelet for Cairo, Illinois, on October 22, 1862, under the command of Acting Volunteer Lieutenant Robert Getty. In November, Union Army Major Generals Ulysses S. Grant and William T. Sherman, along with Acting Rear Admiral David Dixon Porter, decided that the Union Navy would operate against Confederate forces along the Yazoo River, in conjunction with the Vicksburg campaign. Porter's command was known as the Mississippi Squadron. On November 21, Captain Henry A. Walke received orders to move with a naval force from Helena, Arkansas, to the mouth of the Yazoo. Marmora was at Cairo at this time, and was ordered to join Walke. The vessel reached Helena on November 24, and left for the mouth of the Yazoo the next day along with Signal and the ironclad USS Carondelet; the three vessels were joined by the timberclad USS Lexington on November 26. The movement down the Mississippi River was conducted only during the daytime due to low water levels.

During the movement, Marmora had her first combat, destroying several barges at Lake Providence, Louisiana, and later destroying a flatboat and capturing two skiffs. On November 28, Walke's flotilla reached Milliken's Bend, Louisiana, where he sent part of the crew of Marmora on a tugboat, USS Laurel, on a scouting mission. The scouting group was fired on by Confederate guerrillas on the shore, and Acting Ensign H. H. Walker of Marmora was wounded. The next day, Walke's ships reached the mouth of the Yazoo, and Marmora and Signal were sent to scout up the river, accompanied by 20 men and a gunner from Carondelet, as the river level was too low for navigation by the larger ships. The scouting force upriver began at about 10:00 am, and around noon, encountered Confederate cavalry and a picket station. The Confederate cavalry fled after firing on the vessels and Marmora destroyed the picket station with cannon fire. A minor skirmish occurred with Confederate forces 21 miles (34 km) from the mouth of the Yazoo at a ferry site, but the vessels continued for about another 1.5 miles (2.4 km), until they sighted Confederate fortifications on Drumgould's Bluff. The vessels took care to avoid any fighting with the Confederate batteries, and returned to Walke's main force at around 4:00 pm.

=== Sinking of USS Cairo ===
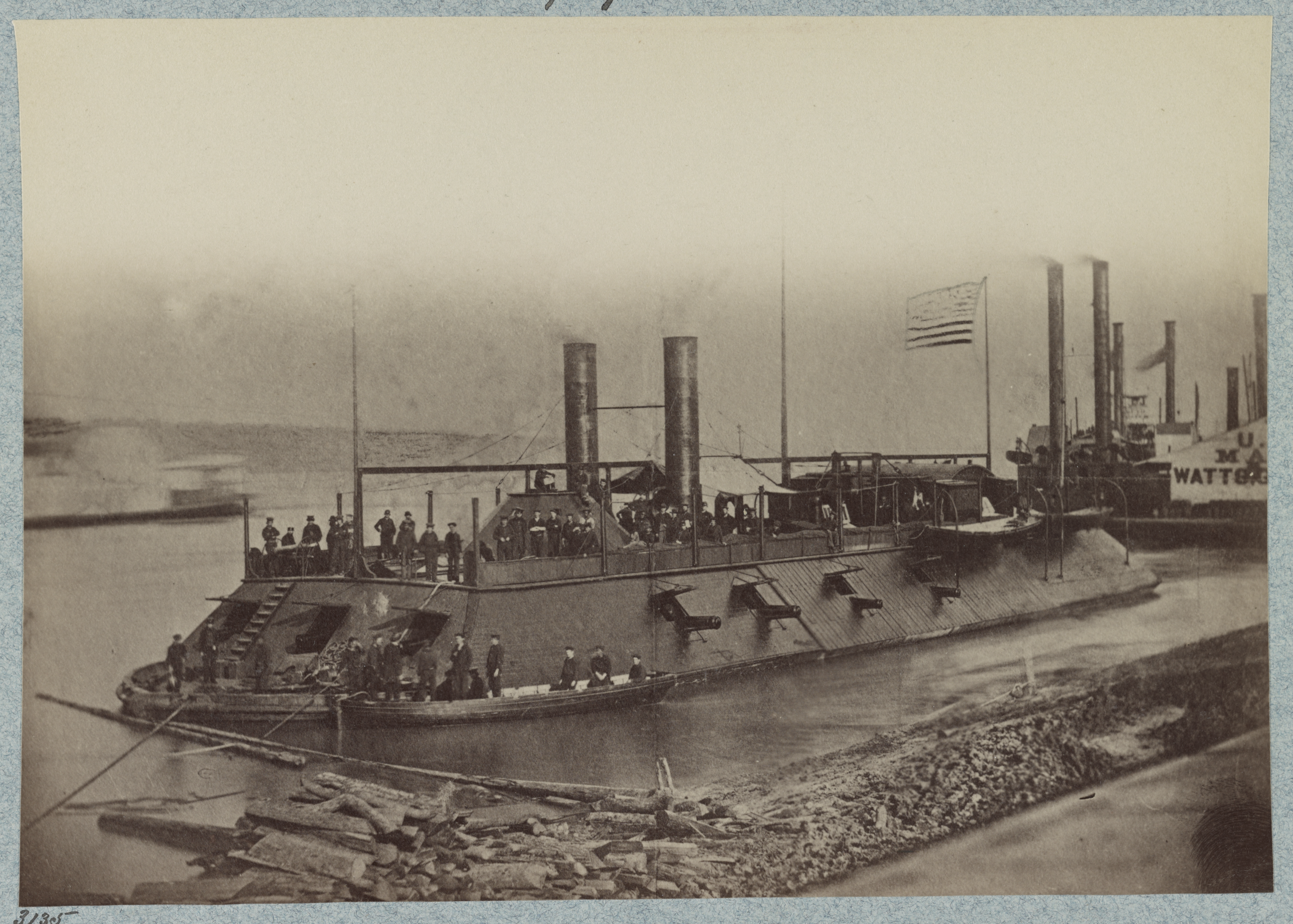
USS Cairo. Marmora was present when Cairo sank on December 12, 1862.

Several Union Navy naval rams arrived at the mouth of the Yazoo in early December 1862, including USS Queen of the West. Marmora helped refloat Queen of the West after the latter vessel ran aground on December 5. Marmora made multiple trips into the Yazoo to perform depth sounding. On December 11, Marmora and Signal were sent back up the Yazoo to scout the Confederate fortifications upriver. Walke had been informed by an escaped slave that the Confederates were erecting a barricade in front of the batteries, and wanted to verify that information. While in sight of the Confederate fortifications, the two ships noticed naval mines floating in the river. One of the men aboard Marmora shot one with a musket, resulting in an explosion that shook the entire ship, despite her being at least 50 feet (15 m) from the mine. While returning to Walke, Marmora and Signal were fired on by Confederate troops on the riverbank. Getty informed Walke that Marmora and Signal could clear the mines from the river if accompanied by larger vessels that could provide covering fire against any Confederate troops on the riverbanks; the water level in the Yazoo had risen enough to accommodate larger vessels.

The next day, Marmora, joined by Signal, Queen of the West, and the ironclads USS Cairo and USS Pittsburgh, moved up the Yazoo to remove the mines. Marmora and Signal were tasked with destroying the mines, with all of the ships' commanders instructed to avoid bringing their ships close to the mines. The expedition entered the Yazoo at around 8:00 am, and at either 10:00 am or 11:00 am met a skiff containing an African American and a white plantation overseer. The overseer admitted to having knowledge of the location of the mines and as a result was arrested. The vessels continued ahead to where the mines were. Those on Cairo heard men from Marmora shooting at objects in the river and continued ahead thinking the tinclad was under assault. Both Cairo and Marmora put small boats into the water to investigate the mines, which were found to be connected to the shore by wires. Cairo and Marmora began to maneuver after launching the boats, and the Confederate batteries on Drumgould's Bluff fired on the vessels at long range. Cairo then struck two mines and quickly sank. None of the crew of Cairo were killed, and they were picked up by the other Union vessels.

=== Chickasaw Bluff and Fort Hindman ===
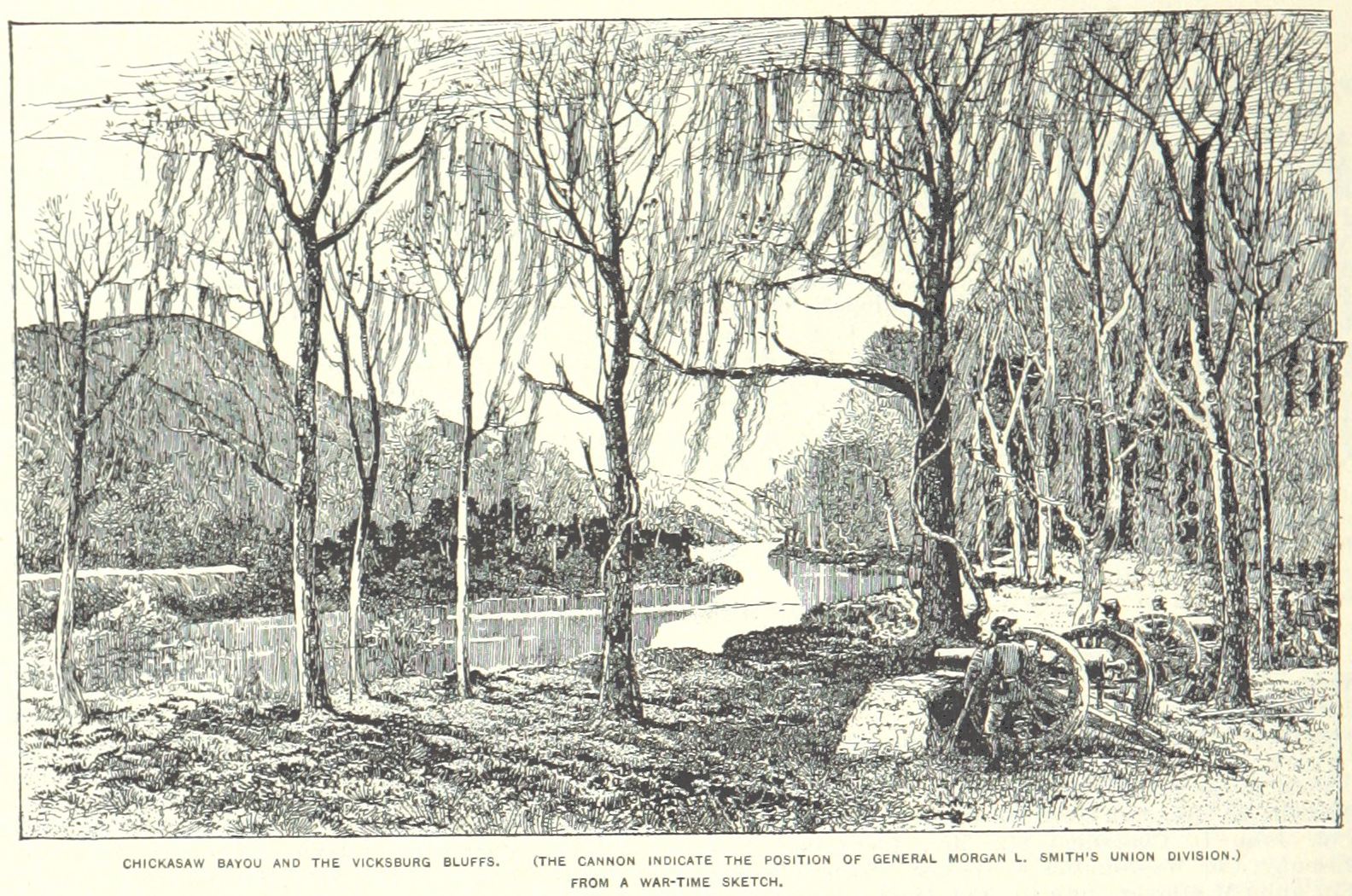
A view of the Confederate positions at Chickasaw Bayou

The surviving Union vessels returned to Walke's main force. Upon their return, the commander of Cairo was told to put his crew on Marmora and take her up the Mississippi River to Cairo, where he was to report to Porter. Marmora met Porter and the gunboat USS Black Hawk on December 17 while moving upriver. Porter elected to not open a court of inquiry against the commander of Cairo, and ordered the mine clearing to be completed. The crewmen of Cairo were landed at Cairo on December 18. Marmora then helped other Union vessels clear the mines out of the river. The naval vessels also probed along the Yazoo in support of Union Army movements in the area. On December 27, Sherman landed army troops in front of Chickasaw Bluff, while Marmora joined six other naval vessels in advancing upriver against Drumgould's Bluff. The naval vessels were to cover Sherman's left flank and draw Confederate attention away from the main Union assault. The flotilla fought against the Confederate batteries, but Marmora remained in the rear and was not struck by fire. While Marmora did join the firing, her shooting, like that of the other vessels, accomplished little.

The next morning, Marmora and the gunboat USS Forest Rose went up the Old River towards the False River and shelled the riverbanks. Forest Rose ran aground, but Marmora freed her, and the two vessels returned to the rest of the Union fleet in the early afternoon. On December 29, Porter's gunboats provided supporting fire, but Sherman's men were repulsed in the Battle of Chickasaw Bayou. Marmora spent part of that day on another expedition into the Old River, this time accompanied by the tinclad USS Romeo. Sherman's men withdrew after the repulse. After the defeat at Chickasaw Bayou, Union leadership used the capture of a Union transport, Blue Wing, as justification for a strike on a Confederate position at Fort Hindman in Arkansas. Marmora was part of the Union fleet that participated in the resulting campaign in January 1863. On January 4, Porter reorganized his force, and Marmora was assigned to a division led by Lieutenant Commander Watson Smith. Porter's ships began the movement towards Fort Hindman that same day. Three days later, a plan for naval activity against the fort was formed. Marmora was to advance upriver with several other ships, but she instead found herself spending the day towing Carondelet, which was low on coal, up to Helena. Marmora then arrived off of the mouth of the White River on the evening of January 9, towing two barges of coal. Fort Hindman surrendered on January 11. On January 14, Marmora was ordered by Porter to return to the rest of the fleet. Three days later, she steamed up the Arkansas River, reached the site of the Confederate fort, and sent a party ashore to help destroy it.

=== Yazoo River operations and burning of Eunice ===
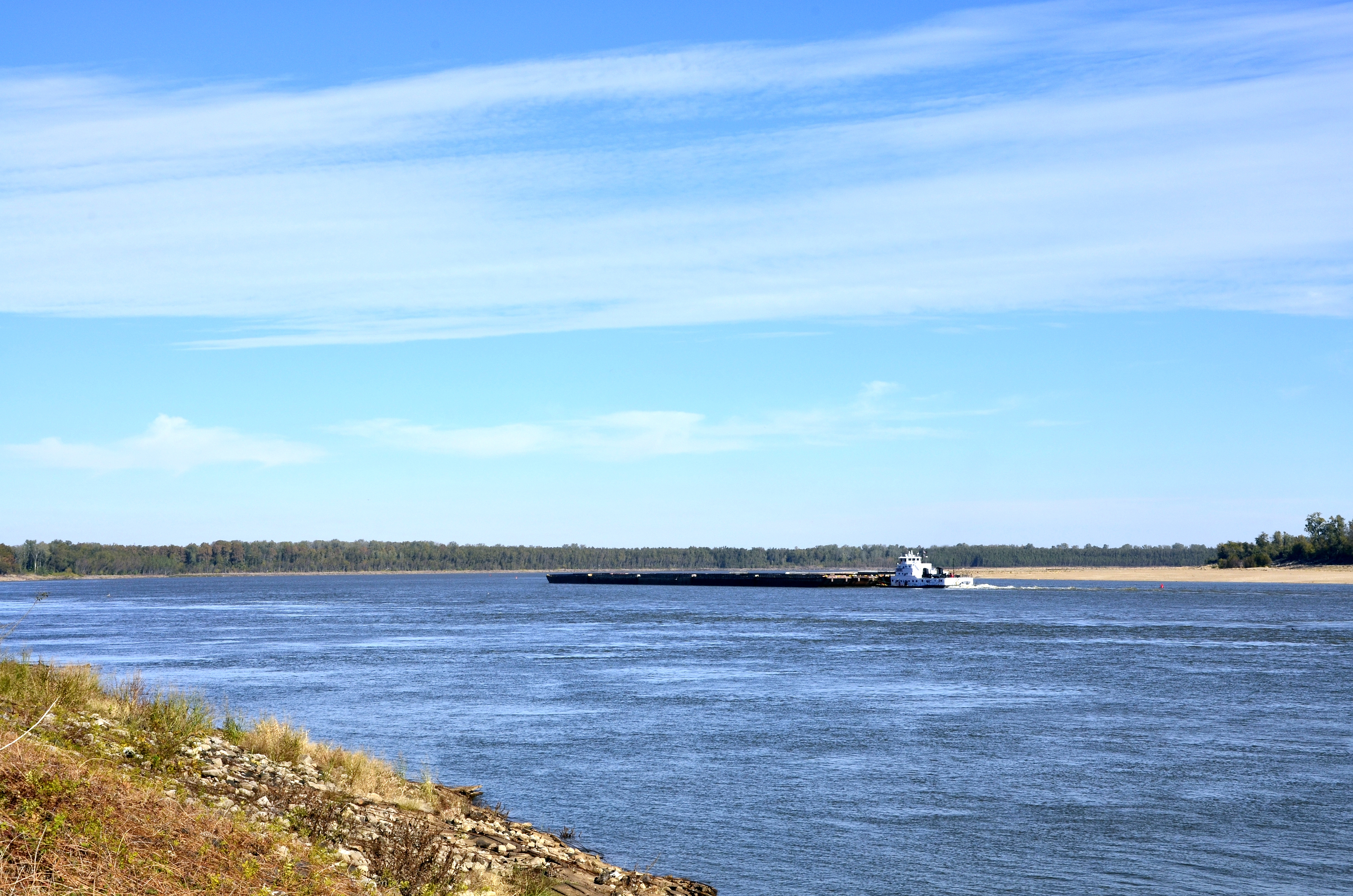
A modern view of the Mississippi River in the area of the former site of Eunice, Arkansas

In early 1863, Grant and Porter made a plan that has become known as the Yazoo Pass expedition to bypass the Confederate stronghold of Vicksburg by moving through nearby waterways. Smith was in charge of the expedition. On February 13, Smith realized that the expedition would take long enough that there would be no chance of surprise, so additional ships, including Marmora, were assigned to the expedition. Marmora, with seven other warships and three coal barges, entered Moon Lake on February 20 or 21, where they waited for a number of transports carrying Union Army troops. The expedition continued through Yazoo Pass itself (Note: A narrow channel leading from the Mississippi River) on February 26, reaching Coldwater, Mississippi, two days later. The narrow channel forced the vessels to advance in a single-file line, so Marmora and the other tinclads assigned to the expedition were distributed throughout the column, to better protect the troop transports and expedite the movement of coal barges. On March 8, Marmora, a towboat, and a transport containing the 29th Iowa Infantry Regiment were left behind at a point on the Tallahatchie River to guard two coal barges. By March 13, Marmora had gone back towards the Mississippi River for supplies. That day, she met a squadron of vessels loaded with troops for the expedition and then escorted the squadron through Moon Lake to Yazoo Pass the next day. March 14 saw Marmora engaged in a minor skirmish against Confederate land forces. Two days later, the tinclad led the vessels through Yazoo Pass. On March 21, Marmora rejoined the main expeditionary force on the Tallahatchie, together with the ships she was escorting. The combined group then moved back down the Tallahatchie towards Confederate-held Fort Pemberton. On March 26, Marmora was released from the expedition to escort a group of transports back upriver; she also carried dispatches.

Marmora arrived at Helena on March 27, slowed by boiler problems, before leaving to return to the Yazoo Pass expedition the same day, along with a coal barge. April 16 saw another minor skirmish between Marmora and Confederate forces, but on April 17 she again left the expedition bearing dispatches and in need of repairs. She spent the next several months on patrol and supply duties, and was reported to be based at the mouth of the Yazoo as of May 8. Late on June 13, Marmora was fired on by Confederate guerillas near the town of Eunice, Arkansas. The next day, the steamer Nebraska, a transport with the United States Quartermaster Department, was fired on in the same area, prompting retribution from Marmora. The latter vessel then fired on the riverbank for two miles up and down from Eunice, and then landed armed parties that burned every structure within a mile of Eunice, including a warehouse and railroad depot. Eunice was completely destroyed during the burning, and the town was replaced by the nearby community of Arkansas City after the war. On June 15, Marmora continued on to Gaines Landing, Arkansas, where she was again fired on. A landing party from the vessel burned all but one house at the settlement in response. The morning of June 16 saw a combined landing force from Marmora and the tinclad USS Prairie Bird burn another house in the Gaines Landing area, as there was circumstantial evidence it was being used by Confederate forces.

=== Late 1863 ===
Beginning on August 8, Marmora moved up the White River as part of a flotilla commanded by Lieutenant George M. Bache, and found the town of St. Charles, Arkansas, deserted due to Union control of the river. Bache's ships met Brigadier General John W. Davidson's division of cavalry on August 9, at Clarendon, Arkansas; this movement occurred around the time of the beginning of the Little Rock campaign. Marmora, along with the tinclad USS Linden, began the return to Helena late that day. The next day, both vessels returned to Clarendon: Linden escorted transports carrying Union Army soldiers commanded by Major General Frederick Steele, while Marmora towed barges. Bache took Marmora, the gunboat USS Cricket, and Lexington, accompanied by part of the 32nd Iowa Infantry Regiment, on an expedition beginning on August 12, to locate Confederate cavalry believed to be in the area. The flotilla stopped at Des Arc to burn a Confederate military warehouse, and then split up at the mouth of the Little Red River. Lexington and Marmora continued on the White River, while Cricket moved up the Little Red, where she captured two Confederate gunboats, Tom Sugg and Kaskaskia. Lexington and Marmora continued up to Augusta, before turning back. When Lexington moved up the Little Red to join Cricket, Marmora remained behind at the junction of the rivers. Bache returned to Clarendon on August 15.

As of August 19, Marmora was assigned to the Fifth Division of the Mississippi Squadron, which was responsible for the area between Vicksburg and the White River. On September 19, Acting Master Elias Rees, who was commanding the tinclad, reported that the ship was in a state of disrepair, with the boilers and machinery in poor condition and several small leaks in the hull. By October 20, she was under the command of Acting Master J. F. Treat and was stationed on the White River. Marmora patrolled on the Mississippi River in the later part of the year, seizing cotton owned by known Confederate sympathizers. For a time in November, she was stationed at the mouth of the Yazoo River to prevent the Confederates from blockading it. As of December 1, she was stationed at Island No. 70, an island located in the Concordia Bend on the Mississippi River, and was commanded by Acting Master Thomas Gibson. By January 14, 1864, she had transferred to Greenville, Mississippi.

=== Yazoo City and later service ===
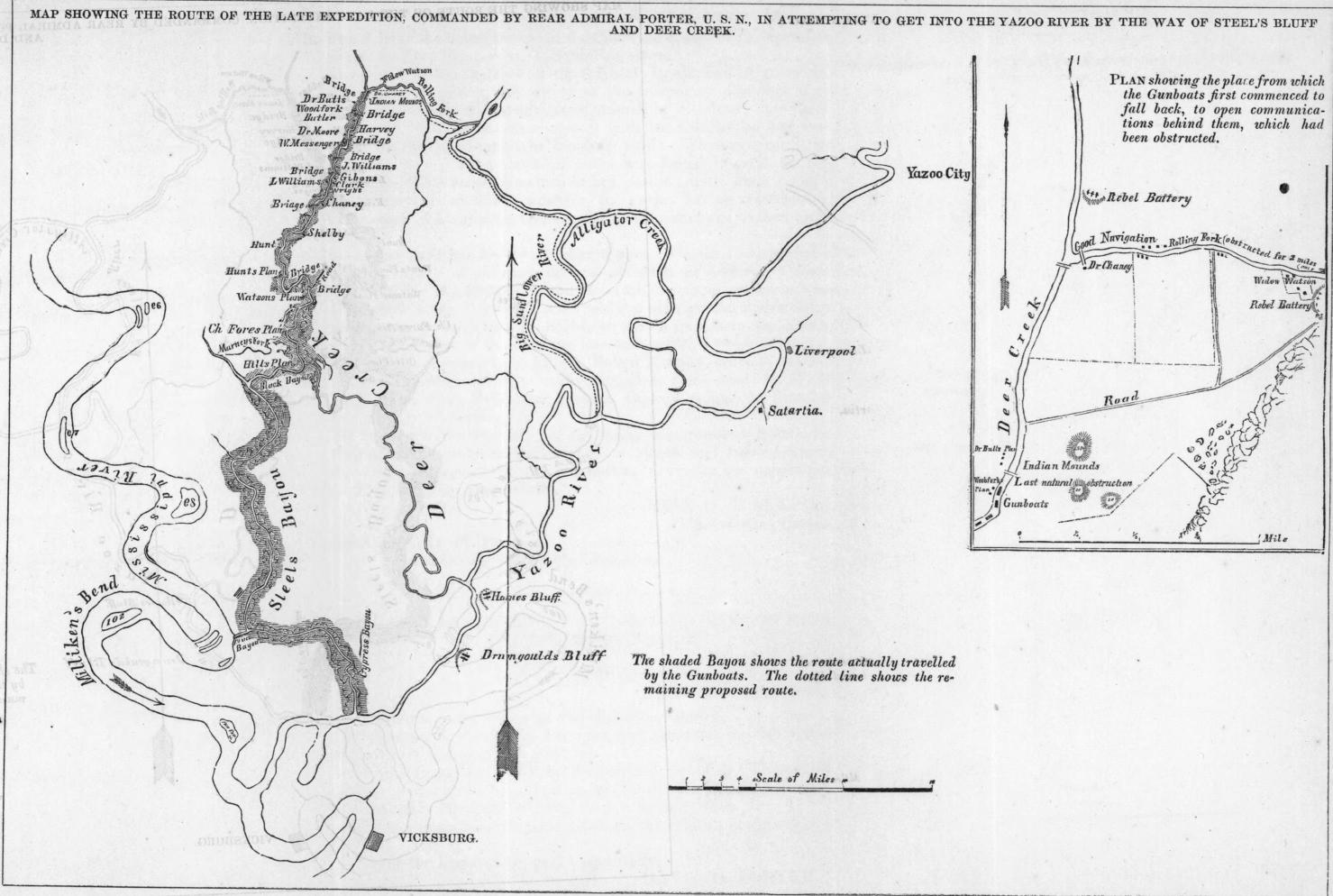
Map of the Satartia, Liverpool, and Yazoo City areas from the Official Records of the Union and Confederate Navies

On February 2, 1864, Marmora began a movement up the Yazoo River along with Prairie Bird, and the tinclads Romeo, USS Exchange and USS Petrel. The naval force was led by Lieutenant Commander Elias K. Owen, and was working in conjunction with a Union Army brigade commanded by Colonel James E. Coates. Later that day, the Union forces skirmished with Confederate land forces near Satartia, Mississippi, and on February 3 and 4 fought against land-based Confederates in the Liverpool, Mississippi, area. On February 4, Marmora and Exchange pushed on to Yazoo City but came under artillery fire and withdrew to Satartia. After Sherman's Meridian campaign drew Confederate forces away from the Yazoo River area, Owen and Coates moved back up the river, probing Yazoo City on February 8, and occupying the town the next day.

Late on February 14, the expedition occupied Greenwood, upriver from Yazoo City. The Union forces collected about 450 cotton bales in the area, while Marmora scouted up the Tallahatchie River. They began returning downriver on February 19, arriving at Yazoo City on February 28. By late February, the Union vessels remaining on the Yazoo were Petrel and Exchange at Yazoo City, Prairie Bird at Liverpool, and Marmora running patrols on the river. After the Meridian campaign ended, Confederate cavalry was free to return to the Yazoo River area, and attacked Yazoo City on March 5. Marmora was present at the city and fired on the Confederate attackers. A 12-pounder howitzer from the tinclad was sent ashore, with a crew under the command of Gibson. The howitzer fired rapidly, and assisted in repulsing the Confederate attacks on Yazoo City. Three seamen from Marmora's howitzer crew received the Medal of Honor for their actions at Yazoo City: William J. Franks, Bartlett Laffey, and James Stoddard; All three men's Medal of Honor citations noted that they had been "bravely standing by his gun despite enemy rifle fire which cut the gun carriage and rammer".

Marmora remained in the area for some time, and then was assigned duties controlling illegal trading, and was reported as of May 17, to be patrolling in the area from the river town of Napoleon, Arkansas, to Island No. 76. As of May 20, she was part of the Sixth Division of the Mississippi Squadron, which was assigned to the region between Vicksburg and the Arkansas River. On August 23, Owen reported that the ship's stern was in poor condition, while Gibson reported on September 13 that the vessel had been visited by smallpox. In February 1865, Marmora accepted the surrender of seven Confederate soldiers, and that same month escorted the ironclad USS Cincinnati to New Orleans, Louisiana. On February 21, she was reported as having been temporarily transferred to the West Gulf Blockading Squadron. By April 1, she had been returned to the Sixth Division of the Mississippi Squadron.

In late April, Marmora was one of the vessels earmarked to patrol the regions of the Mississippi River where it was thought most likely that fleeing Confederate president Jefferson Davis might attempt to cross the river. (Note: Davis was actually captured in Georgia in May.) Marmora was reported on May 8 to be patrolling in the area between Napoleon and Gaines Landing. The war was winding down in April and May with a Confederate defeat, and on May 29, Marmora was one of a number of vessels reported as surplus by the Mississippi Squadron. She was sent to Mound City, Illinois, in June, where she entered reserve status. Decommissioned on July 7, she was sold to D. D. Barr for $8,650, (equivalent to $181,932 in 2025) at a public auction on August 17. The tinclad had required $15,107.40 (equivalent to $317,740 in 2025) in repairs while in military service. Nothing further about her after her sale is known. Extracts from her ship's log were later published more times in the Official Records of the Union and Confederate Navies than those of any other tinclad; naval historian Myron J. Smith suggests that this may indicate that Marmora was a favorite vessel of the compilers.

== Sources ==
- Bearss, Edwin C. (1980) [1966]. Hardluck Ironclad: The Sinking and Salvage of the Cairo. Baton Rouge, Louisiana: Louisiana State University Press. ISBN 0-8071-0684-4.
- Bearss, Edwin C. (1991) [1986]. The Campaign for Vicksburg. Vol. I: Vicksburg is the Key. Dayton, Ohio: Morningside Bookshop. ISBN 0-89029-312-0.
- Bragg, Marion (1977). Historic Names and Places on the Lower Mississippi River. Vicksburg, Mississippi: Mississippi River Commission. OCLC 3318886.
- Christ, Mark K. (2010). Civil War Arkansas 1863: The Battle for a State. Norman, Oklahoma: University of Oklahoma Press. ISBN 978-0-8061-4433-7.
- Kennedy, Frances H., ed. (1998). The Civil War Battlefield Guide (2nd ed.). Boston/New York: Houghton Mifflin. ISBN 978-0-395-74012-5.
- Official Records of the Union and Confederate Navies in the War of the Rebellion, Series 1. Vol. 24. Washington, D.C.: Government Printing Office. 1911. OCLC 5194016.
- Official Records of the Union and Confederate Navies in the War of the Rebellion, Series 1. Vol. 25. Washington, D.C.: Government Printing Office. 1912. OCLC 5194016.
- Official Records of the Union and Confederate Navies in the War of the Rebellion, Series 1. Vol. 26. Washington, D.C.: Government Printing Office. 1914. OCLC 5194016.
- Official Records of the Union and Confederate Navies in the War of the Rebellion, Series 1. Vol. 27. Washington, D.C.: Government Printing Office. 1917. OCLC 5194016.
- Official Records of the Union and Confederate Navies in the War of the Rebellion, Series 2. Vol. 1. Washington, D.C.: Government Printing Office. 1921. OCLC 5194016.
- Silverstone, Paul H. (1989). Warships of the Civil War Navies. Annapolis, Maryland: Naval Institute Press. ISBN 0-87021-783-6.
- Smith, Myron J. (2010a). Tinclads in the Civil War: Union Light-Draught Gunboat Operations on Western Waters, 1862–1865. Jefferson, North Carolina: McFarland & Company. ISBN 978-0-7864-3579-1.
- Smith, Myron J. (2010b). The USS Carondelet: A Civil War Ironclad on Western Waters. Jefferson, North Carolina: McFarland & Company. ISBN 978-0-7864-4524-0.
- Smith, Myron J. (2012). The Fight for the Yazoo, August 1862–July 1864: Swamps, Forts and Fleets on Vicksburg's Northern Flank. Jefferson, North Carolina: McFarland & Company. ISBN 9780786462810.
- Tomblin, Barbara Brooks (2016). The Civil War on the Mississippi: Union Sailors, Gunboat Captains, and the Campaign to Control the River. Lexington, Kentucky: University Press of Kentucky. ISBN 9780813167046.
