= James Stoddard =

James Stoddard may refer to:

- James Stoddard (author), American fantasy author
- James Stoddard (Medal of Honor) (1838–?), United States Navy sailor and Medal of Honor recipient

== See also ==
- Jamie Stoddard (born 1977), Canadian football player
- James Stodart (1849—1922), Australian politician
- Sir James Fraser Stoddart (born 1942), Scottish chemist
