= Bobby Crockett =

American football player (1943–2026)

- Crockett, at Arkansas

No. 83
- Positions: Split end, Wide receiver

Personal information
- Born: April 3, 1943; Briggsville, Arkansas, U.S.
- Died: May 29, 2026 (aged 83); Fayetteville, Arkansas, U.S.
- Listed height: 6 ft 3 in (1.91 m)
- Listed weight: 200 lb (91 kg)

Career information
- High school: Dermott (Dermott, Arkansas)
- College: Arkansas (1962–1965)
- NFL draft: 1966: 19th round, 282nd overall pick
- AFL draft: 1966: 10th round, 91st overall pick

Career history
- Buffalo Bills (1966–1969)

Awards and highlights
- National champion (1964); First-team All-American (1965); First-team All-SWC (1965)

Career AFL statistics
- Receptions: 41
- Receiving yards: 659
- Receiving touchdowns: 3
- Stats at Pro Football Reference

Robert Paul Crockett (April 3, 1943 – May 29, 2026) was an American professional football player who was a wide receiver for the Buffalo Bills of the American Football League (AFL) in 1966, and also in 1968 and 1969. He played college football for the Arkansas Razorbacks, earning first-team All-American honors in 1965.

== Biography ==
Crockett was born in Briggsville, Arkansas, on April 3, 1943. He played high school football at Dermott High School. He played college football for the Razorbacks at the University of Arkansas from 1962 to 1965.

He was selected in the 10th round (the 90th pick overall by the Bills in the 1966 AFL draft and also by the National Football League (NFL)'s New York Giants in the 19th round (the 282nd overall pick) in the 1966 NFL draft, electing to sign with the Bills.

Crockett was a teammate of Bobby Burnett with both the Arkansas Razorbacks and the Buffalo Bills. Burnett was born in Clinton, Arkansas, and Crockett was later a long-time attorney in Clinton.

Crockett died in Fayetteville, Arkansas, on May 29, 2026, at the age of 83. At the time of his death he had been diagnosed with stage IV pancreatic cancer and had contracted pneumonia a week prior.

== See also ==
- List of American Football League players
