= Collins, Arkansas =

- Census-designated place
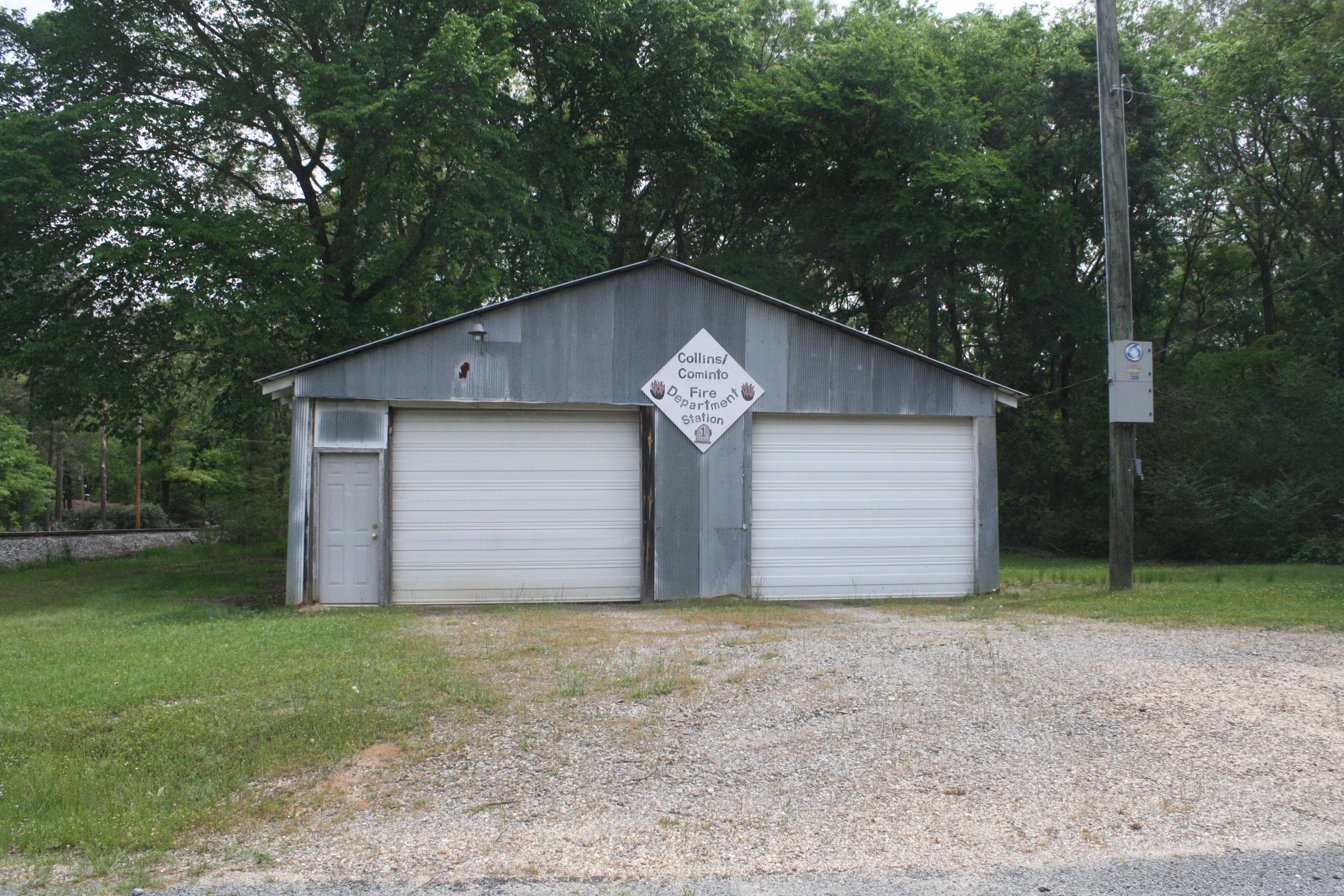
- Collins-Cominto Fire Department, Station 1

- Location within Arkansas Location within the United States
- Coordinates: 33°31′56″N 91°34′21″W
- Country: United States
- State: Arkansas
- County: Drew

Area
  - Total: 1.63 sq mi (4.21 km^{2})
  - Land: 1.63 sq mi (4.21 km^{2})
  - Water: 0 sq mi (0.00 km^{2})
- Elevation: 154 ft (47 m)

Population (2020)
  - Total: 149
  - Density: 92/sq mi (35.4/km^{2})
- Time zone: UTC-6 (Central (CST))
  - Summer (DST): UTC-5 (CDT)
- ZIP Code: 71638 (Dermott)
- FIPS code: 05-14920
- GNIS feature ID: 2805233

Collins is an unincorporated community and census-designated place (CDP) in Drew County, Arkansas, United States. It is located along Arkansas Highway 35, 7 miles (11 km) west of Dermott and 15 miles (24 km) southeast of Monticello. It was first listed as a CDP in the 2020 census with a population of 149.

== History ==
The community was initially called Cut-Off after nearby Cut-Off Creek. It had a post office by 1850 and served as a stagecoach stop. The Mississippi, Ouachita and Red River Railroad was constructed to Collins before halting due to the Panic of 1857. It was an important rail stop for shipping cotton, timber and hogs from the region to market. The community began to decline in the early 1900s.

== Demographics ==
Historical population
Census	Pop.	Note	%±
2020	149		—
U.S. Decennial Census; 2020

=== 2020 census ===
Collins CDP, Arkansas – Racial and ethnic composition Note: the US Census treats Hispanic/Latino as an ethnic category. This table excludes Latinos from the racial categories and assigns them to a separate category. Hispanics/Latinos may be of any race.
Race / Ethnicity (NH = Non-Hispanic)	Pop 2020	% 2020
White alone (NH)	133	89.26%
Black or African American alone (NH)	2	1.34%
Native American or Alaska Native alone (NH)	0	0.00%
Asian alone (NH)	0	0.00%
Pacific Islander alone (NH)	0	0.00%
Some Other Race alone (NH)	3	2.01%
Mixed Race or Multi-Racial (NH)	6	4.03%
Hispanic or Latino (any race)	5	3.36%
Total	149	100.00%

== Education ==
Collins is in the Dermott School District, which operates Dermott High School.

Collins previously had its own school district. In 1979 the Collins school district dissolved, with portions of the students going to the Dermott school district.
