= Charlie Davey =

Charlie or Charles Davey may refer to:

- Charlie Davey (footballer) (1908–1991), Australian rules footballer
- Charlie Davey (cyclist) (1887–1964), British racing cyclist
- Charles Davey (Nebraska politician) (1909–1989), American politician from Nebraska
- Charles Pierce Davey (1925–2002), American welterweight boxer and a boxing commissioner for the state of Michigan
- J. Charles Davey (1869–1939), American Catholic priest and Jesuit
