= Isaac George Bailey =

American politician

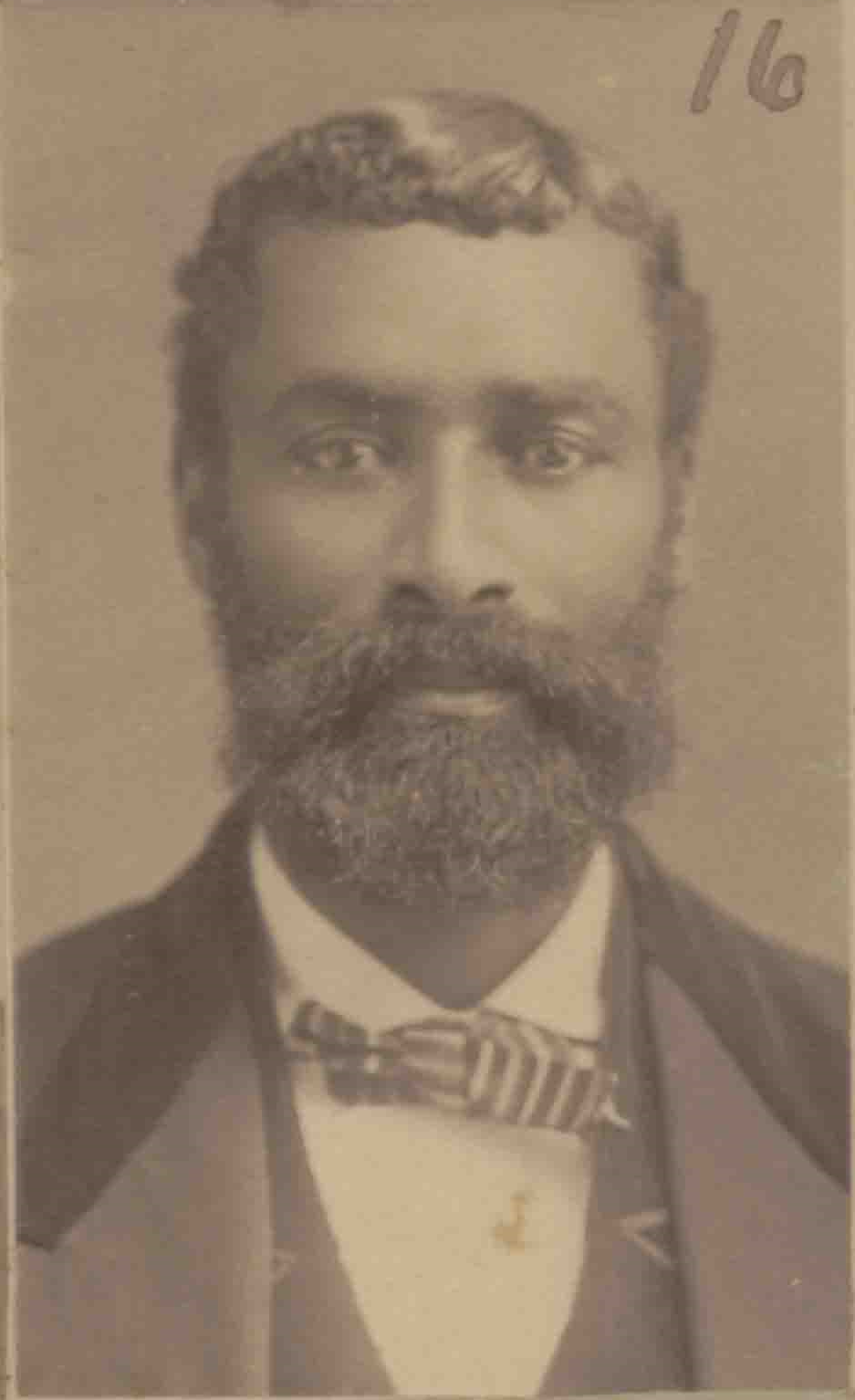
Isaac George Bailey

Isaac George Bailey (1846 or 1847 - 1914) was an educator, Baptist minister, and member of the Arkansas legislature. He served in the Arkansas House of Representatives in 1885, representing Desha County. His photograph was taken as one of the 1885 Arkansas House members. The caption says he was a Republican and Tillar Station was his post office.

He was born 1847 in Arkansas City to Perry and Virginia Bailey, although some sources say 1846. He was educated in Pine Bluff at the Branch Normal College now the University of Arkansas at Pine Bluff. He served as a pastor at both First Baptist Church in Dermott and the Log Bayou Church in Tillar Station, just west of Tillar, Arkansas.

1885 House of Representatives composite photo of the Twenty-Fifth General Assembly of the State of Arkansas

In 1866, he married Winnie White with whom he had two children, Charles H. Bailey and Maude Bailey Frazier. In 1884, he married his second wife Susie E. Ford (d. 1948) and together they were prominent religious leaders. They had nine children together but six died before reaching adulthood.

He was a co-founder of the Dermott Baptist Industrial School in Dermott. The school preceded Chicot County Training School and Morris-Booker Memorial College.

He died in early 1914 and had a large funeral, as he was respected in both the black and white communities.

== See also ==
- African American officeholders from the end of the Civil War until before 1900
