= Charles Davey (Nebraska politician) =

American politician (1909–1989)

Member of the Nebraska Legislature from the 48th district
- In office June 3, 1974 – January 8, 1975
- Preceded by: Terry Carpenter
- Succeeded by: William E. Nichol

Personal details
- Born: September 8, 1909 Stoddard, Nebraska
- Died: March 15, 1989 (aged 79) Scottsbluff, Nebraska
- Party: Democratic
- Spouse: Grace
- Children: 2 (Chuck Jr., Frank)
- Occupation: Businessman

Charles Davey (September 8, 1909 – March 15, 1989) was a Democratic politician from Nebraska who served as a member of the Nebraska Legislature from the 48th district from 1974 to 1975.

== Early career ==
Davey was born in Stoddard, Nebraska, in 1909, and moved to Scottsbluff in 1920 . He joined his father in the oil business, forming the Davey Oil Company in 1946, and the Davey Real Estate Company in 1953.

== Local politics ==
Davey served two non-consecutive terms on the Scottsbluff City Council from 1942 to 1943 and 1947 to 1949. In 1954, Davey ran for the Scotts Bluff County Commission. He won the Democratic primary and faced Republican nominee C. A. Emery, the former county assessor, in the general election. He narrowly Emery, winning 53–47 percent.

In 1958, Davey considered running for Governor at the urging of several prominent western Nebraskans, but ultimately declined to do so. Instead, Davey ran for re-election, and was re-elected unopposed. He declined to seek re-election in 1962.

== Nebraska Legislature ==
In 1974, State Senator Terry Carpenter ran for Lieutenant Governor and lost in the Democratic primary. He resigned from the legislature following his defeat, and Governor J. James Exon appointed Davey to serve out the remaining months of Carpenter's term. Davey was sworn in on June 3, 1974, and declined to seek a full term as a write-in candidate. Carpenter, however, attempted to reclaim his seat as a write-in candidate and narrowly lost.

== Death ==
Davey died on March 15, 1989.
