= Stoddart =

Stoddart is a surname. Notable people with the surname include:

- Alexander Stoddart (born 1959), Scottish sculptor
- Andrew Stoddart (1863–1915), English cricketer and rugby union player
- Archibald Peile Stoddart (1860–1939), British admiral
- Cassie Jo Stoddart (1989-2006), American murder victim
- Charles Stoddart (1806–1842), British officer and diplomat, who was put to death by the Emir of Bukhara
- David Stoddart, Baron Stoddart of Swindon (1926–2020), British independent Labour politician
- David Stoddart (geographer) (1937–2014), English geographer and coral atoll expert
- Fraser Stoddart (1942–2024), British-American chemist
- Greta Stoddart (born 1966), English poet
- Jennifer Stoddart (born 1949), Privacy Commissioner of Canada
- Jessamy Stoddart (born 1993), English actress
- Joseph Stoddart (1932–2019), English anaesthetist
- Joseph Marshall Stoddart (1845–1921), American magazine editor
- Margaret Stoddart (1865–1934), New Zealand artist
- Morgan Stoddart (born 1984), Welsh rugby union footballer
- Paul Stoddart (born 1955), Australian millionaire and owner of the Minardi Formula One racing team
- Peter Stoddart (1934–2019), English cricketer
- Ryley Stoddart (born 1999), Australian rules footballer
- Simon Stoddart (born 1958), Scottish archaeologist and prehistorian
- Susie Stoddart (born 1982), Scottish racing driver
- Tom Stoddart (1953–2021), British photojournalist
- William Stoddart (1925–2023), British philosopher
- William Lee Stoddart (1868–1940), American architect

in fiction:

- Ransom "Rance" Stoddart in the film The Man Who Shot Liberty Vallance

== See also ==
- Stoddart Publishing
- Stoddart Kids, an imprint of Fitzhenry & Whiteside
- Stoddard (disambiguation)
- Stodart
