= William Joseph Franks =

- Born: 1830; Pittsboro, North Carolina, US
- Died: April 18, 1880 (aged 49–50); Independence County, Arkansas, US
- Military career
- Allegiance: United States; Union
- Branch: United States Navy
- Service years: 1863 - 1865
- Rank: Acting Master's mate
- Unit: USS Marmora
- Conflicts: American Civil War
- Awards: Medal of Honor

William Joseph Franks (1830 – April 18, 1880) was a United States Navy sailor who received the Medal of Honor for his actions in the American Civil War.

== Biography ==
Franks was born in Pittsboro, North Carolina in 1830. He enlisted in the United States Navy on September 16, 1863, during the American Civil War.

Franks distinguished himself in action at Yazoo City, Mississippi on March 5, 1864, when he and his shipmates from the USS Marmora landed a 12-pound howitzer to defend the city, which was threatened by strong Confederate forces. He and his group were in the thickest of the fighting, but it was never enough to drive them from their cannon. The actions of Franks and his men came to play the most important role in maintaining the Union position. Franks received the Medal of Honor and was promoted to Acting Master's Mate in recognition of his actions. Two of his shipmates, Seaman James Stoddard and Seaman Bartlett Laffey, were also awarded the medal for being on the gun crew.

Franks was discharged from the Navy in August 1865, and settled in Arkansas.

He married Mary Francis in 1865, after his separation from the Navy; according to the 1880 Federal census, they had five children.

William J. Franks died in April 1880.

== Namesake ==
A Fletcher-class destroyer, USS Franks (DD-554), was named in his honor and launched on December 7, 1942.

== Medal of Honor citation ==
Rank and organization: Seaman, U.S. Navy. Born: 1830, Chatham County, N.C. Entered service at: Duvalls Bluff, Ark. G.O. No.: 32, April 16, 1864.

Citation:

The President of the United States of America, in the name of Congress, takes pleasure in presenting the Medal of Honor to Seaman William J. Franks, United States Navy, for extraordinary heroism in action while serving on board the U.S.S. Marmora off Yazoo City, Mississippi, 5 March 1864. Embarking from the Marmora with a 12-pound howitzer mounted on a field carriage, Seaman Franks landed with the gun and crew in the midst of heated battle and, bravely standing by his gun despite enemy rifle fire which cut the gun carriage and rammer contributed to the turning back of the enemy during the fierce engagement.

== See also ==
- List of American Civil War Medal of Honor recipients: A–F
