= USS Franks =

Fletcher-class destroyer

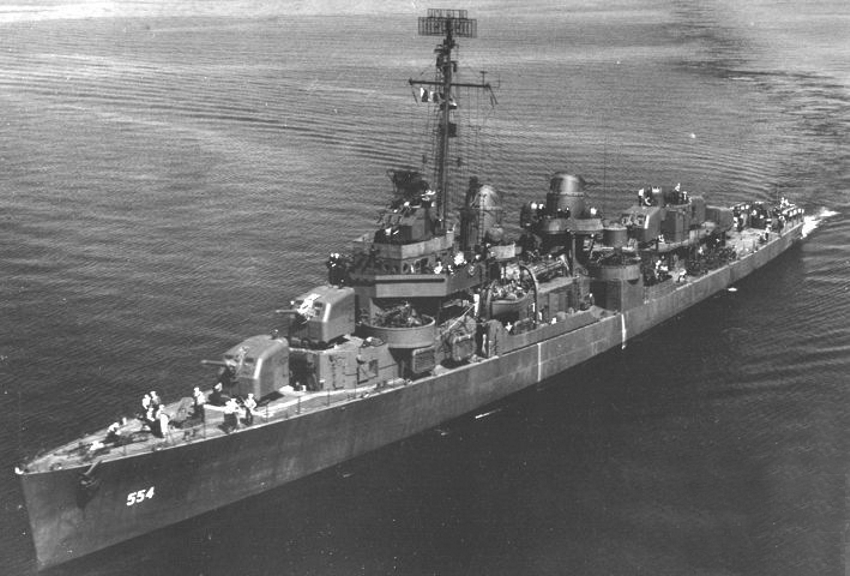

History

United States
- Name: Franks
- Namesake: William Joseph Franks
- Builder: Seattle-Tacoma Shipbuilding Corporation
- Laid down: 8 March 1942
- Launched: 7 December 1942
- Commissioned: 30 July 1943
- Decommissioned: 31 May 1946
- Stricken: 1 December 1972
- Fate: Sold for scrapping, 1 August 1973

General characteristics
- Class & type: Fletcher-class destroyer
- Displacement: 2,050 tons
- Length: 376 ft 6 in (114.76 m)
- Beam: 39 ft 8 in (12.09 m)
- Draft: 17 ft 9 in (5.41 m)
- Propulsion: 60,000 shp (45,000 kW); 2 propellers
- Speed: 35 knots (65 km/h; 40 mph)
- Range: 6,500 nmi (12,000 km) at 15 kn (28 km/h)
- Complement: 336
- Armament: 5 × single Mk 12 5 in (127 mm)/38 guns; 5 × twin 40 mm (1.6 in) Bofors AA guns; 7 × single 20 mm (0.8 in) Oerlikon AA guns; 2 × quintuple 21 in (533 mm) torpedo tubes; 6 × single depth charge throwers; 2 × depth charge racks

USS Franks (DD-554), a World War II-era Fletcher-class destroyer in the service of the United States Navy, was named after Medal of Honor recipient Acting Master's Mate William Joseph Franks.

Franks was launched on 7 December 1942 by Seattle-Tacoma Shipbuilding Corporation, Seattle, Washington; sponsored by Mrs. Martha F. W. Carr, a cousin of Acting Master's Mate Franks, and commissioned on 30 July 1943.

== History ==
Franks arrived at Pearl Harbor 25 October 1943 to prepare for the invasion of the Gilbert Islands, for which she sortied 10 November. She screened escort carriers providing air cover for the Tarawa landings, then patrolled off Betio until 27 December, returning then to Pearl Harbor for a brief repair period. The destroyer was underway once more 22 January 1944 with the Southern Attack Force for the invasion of Kwajalein, during which she patrolled against submarines, as well as closing Ebeye Island for reconnaissance and bombardment. Again she replenished at Pearl Harbor, between 18 February and 4 March, then sailed for convoy and patrol duty in the Solomon Islands, arriving at Purvis Bay 15 March.

Targets for Franks' reconnaissance and bombardment missions in March and April 1944 included Mussau, north of New Ireland; Kapingamaringi; and Bougainville. In May, screening minelayers in Buka Passage, Franks and Haggard contacted, attacked, and sank the Japanese submarine I-176 on 16 May. Returning to the central Pacific the next month, Franks joined in the preinvasion bombardment of Guam from 12 July, and gave fire support to the assault troops who landed there 21 July. After replenishing at Eniwetok, Franks sailed back to the South Pacific to prepare for the invasion of the Palaus, off which she arrived 15 September. She served as screen and fighter-director ship, then covered the occupation of Ulithi 23 September.

On 1 October 1944, Franks sailed from Manus, beginning a month and a half of operations in the Philippines screening escort carriers. She took part in the preinvasion strikes on Leyte and the landings there, then fought gallantly to protect the escort carriers in the Battle off Samar phase of the Battle of Leyte Gulf, coming under the pounding fire of Japanese battleships 25 October. After replenishing at Manus, she returned to Leyte late in November, and in December joined the fast carrier task force to cover the landings on Mindoro, and to conduct strikes in preparation for the Luzon assault of January 1945.

Still screening the fast carriers, Franks took part in strikes on the Japanese home islands on 16 and 17 February 1945 on the eve of the invasion of Iwo Jima, then sailed from Ulithi 14 March for strikes on Kyūshū and the Nansei Shoto in preparation for the Okinawa operation. On 18 March her task force came under heavy enemy air attack, and Franks claimed one of the attacking aircraft, joining in the fire which brought several others down. Joining the battleship group, Franks closed the southern coast of Okinawa on 24 March for a preinvasion bombardment, which hid the intention to land at Hagushi on the western coast. Franks cruised off Okinawa, serving as plane guard for carriers covering the landings 1 April, until 2 April, when she was badly damaged and her commanding officer was fatally injured in a collision with the battleship New Jersey. She sailed at once for temporary repairs at Ulithi, from which she departed 13 April for overhaul at Puget Sound Naval Shipyard.

Franks returned to the western Pacific on 17 August 1945 at Eniwetok, and on 3 September rendezvoused with the fast carrier task force for air-sea rescue and weather station duty for flights between Okinawa and Honshū. She entered Tokyo Bay 13 September, and on 1 October sailed for the west coast. Franks was placed out of commission in reserve at San Pedro, California 31 May 1946, and sold for scrapping on 1 August 1973.

== Honors ==
Franks received nine battle stars for World War II service. Credited with the first swimming rescue of downed Navy aviators, Mel Collins radar man and first SEAL rescue diver. (Murphy, B 1st navy seals)
