= Eunice, Arkansas =

- Ghost town
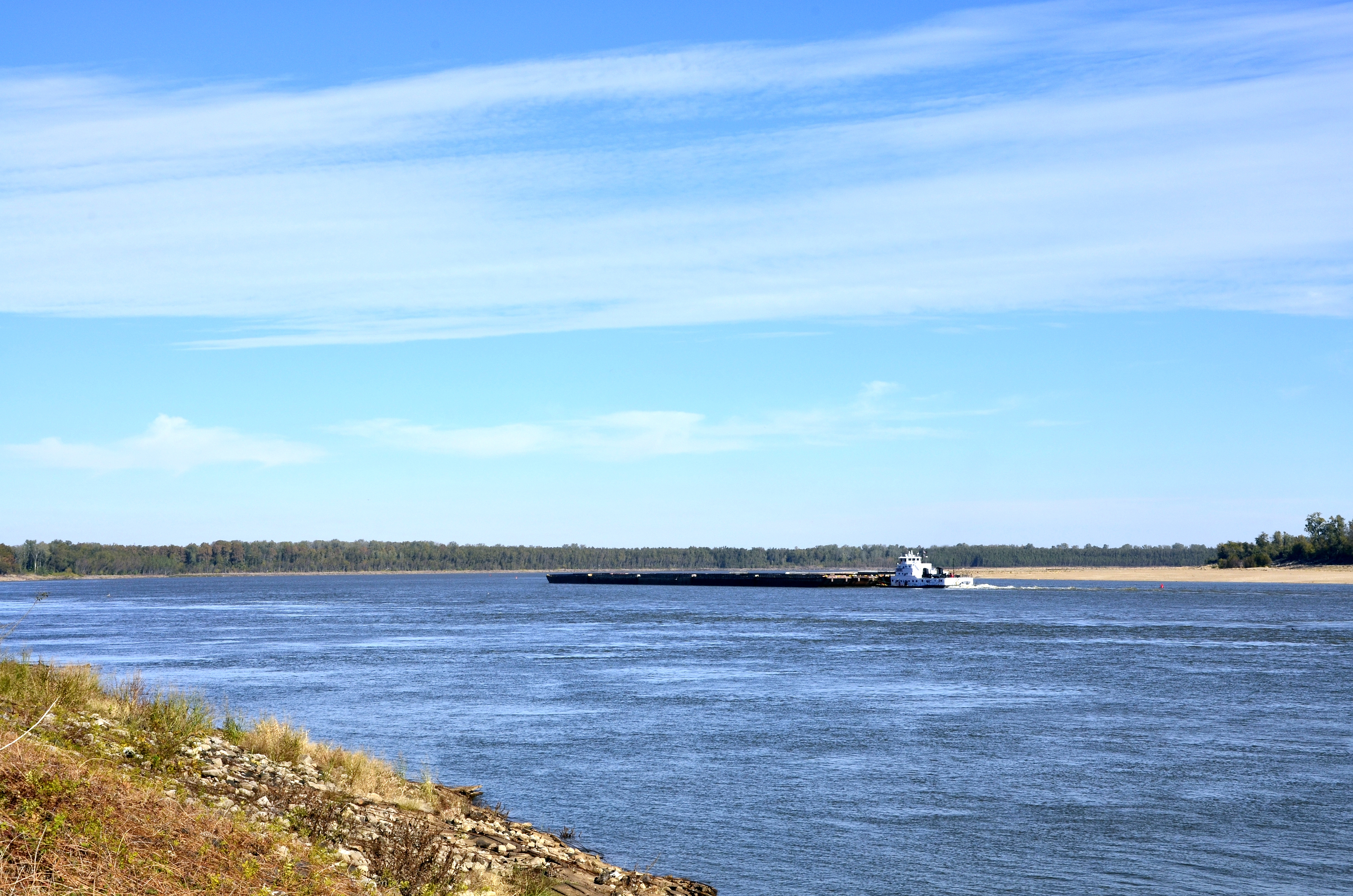
- Looking north on the Mississippi River from Eunice

- Location within Arkansas Location within the United States
- Coordinates: 33°32′51″N 91°13′59″W
- Country: United States
- State: Arkansas
- County: Chicot
- Elevation: 131 ft (40 m)
- Time zone: UTC-6 (Central (CST))
  - Summer (DST): UTC-5 (CDT)
- GNIS feature ID: 61708

Eunice (also Eunice Landing and Railroad Township) is a ghost town on the east bank of the Mississippi River in Chicot County, Arkansas, United States.

The settlement was completely destroyed by the Union Army during the American Civil War.

== History ==
Eunice was the eastern terminus of the Mississippi, Ouachita and Red River Railroad, the first railroad chartered in Arkansas. Construction of the line began in 1852, and by the start of the Civil War, 7 mi (11 km) of track had been laid west from Eunice. The railroad was completed after the war, but was abandoned in 1875 after flooding on the Mississippi River damaged the railbed and bridges.

Arkansas Highway 208 between Eunice and Halley was built on top of the abandoned railbed.

=== Civil War ===
On June 14, 1863, Confederate rebels at Eunice fired artillery onto the Union gunboat USS Marmora. The Marmora returned fire, and then anchored at Eunice. The next morning, the union gunboat Nebraska was fired upon as it approached Eunice. Both the Marmora and Nebraska bombarded the town with artillery, and then sent a party ashore. The soldiers set fire to stores, houses, and the railroad depot, destroying the town. The commander of the Marmora reported: "not a single vestige of the town of Eunice remains".

No rebels were found.

== Today ==
The Yellow Bend Port—a modern industrial port, harbor and turning basin—is located on the original townsite. Nothing remains of Eunice.
