= Zilner Randolph =

American jazz trumpeter (1899–1994)

- Born: Zilner Trenton Randolph; January 28, 1899; Dermott, Arkansas, US
- Died: February 2, 1994 (aged 95); Chicago, Illinois, US
- Education: Biddle University; Kreuger Conservatory; Wisconsin Conservatory of Music
- Occupations: Musician; composer; music educator
- Musical career
- Genre: Jazz
- Instruments: Trumpet; piano
- Years active: 1920s–1970s

Zilner Trenton Randolph (January 28, 1899 – February 2, 1994) was an American jazz trumpeter, arranger, and music educator.

== Biography ==
Randolph was born on January 28, 1899, in Dermott, Arkansas. He attended Biddle University, the Kreuger Conservatory, and the Wisconsin Conservatory of Music.

Randolph played in St. Louis in the early 1920s, then in Bernie Young's band in Milwaukee from 1927 to 1930. He moved to Chicago in 1931 and was a trumpeter and arranger with Louis Armstrong in 1931 and 1932, and again from 1933 to 1935. Randolph also played trumpet on a number of Armstrong's recordings and composed the tune "Old Man Mose". He played with Carroll Dickerson and Dave Peyton in 1934, and led his own Chicago band later in the 1930s. He arranged for such bandleaders as Earl Hines, Woody Herman, Fletcher Henderson, and Duke Ellington, and led a quartet in the 1940s.

From the 1940s, Randolph devoted himself mainly to teaching, but recorded as a pianist in 1951. He retired in the 1970s, and died on February 2, 1994, aged 95, in Chicago. His daughter, Hattie, became a vocalist, and his son, Lucious, became a trumpeter. Both were part of Sun Ra's band in the 1950s.
