= Bartlett Laffey =

United States Medal of Honor recipient

- Born: 1841; County Galway, Ireland
- Died: March 22, 1901 (aged 59–60); Chelsea, Massachusetts, US
- Military career
- Allegiance: United States of America; Union
- Branch: United States Navy; Union Navy
- Rank: Seaman
- Unit: (United States Navy) USS Marmora
- Conflicts: American Civil War
- Awards: Medal of Honor

Bartlett Laffey (1841 – March 22, 1901) was an Irish American United States Navy sailor and Medal of Honor recipient.

== Biography ==
Born in County Galway, Ireland, he enlisted in the United States Navy from Massachusetts on March 17, 1862, and was assigned to stern wheel gunboat USS Marmora.

On March 5, 1864, the Confederates launched a heavy attack on Union positions at Yazoo City, Mississippi. In the midst of heated battle Laffey landed a 12-pound howitzer and her crew. Despite enemy rifle fire which cut up the gun carriage and severed the rammer, Laffey bravely stood by his gun and contributed greatly to turning back the fierce Confederate assault. Seaman Laffey received the Medal of Honor for his actions. Two of his shipmates, Seaman James Stoddard and Seaman William J. Franks, were also awarded the medal for being on the gun crew.

He died at Chelsea, Massachusetts, on March 22, 1901.

== Namesakes ==
Two ships in the United States Navy have been given their name in honor of Bartlett Laffey. His granddaughter, Miss Eleanor Fogerty, christened the first USS Laffey (DD-459), a Benson class destroyer, in 1941. This ship was lost during the Naval Battle of Guadalcanal in 1942. The second ship was USS Laffey (DD-724), an Allen M. Sumner class destroyer which was built in 1943 and served until 1975. She was laid down less than a year after the loss of the first Laffey and named for that ship as much as for Seaman Laffey. The second USS Laffey is now preserved as a museum ship and is registered as a National Historic Landmark.

== Medal of Honor citation ==
Rank and organization: Seaman, U.S. Navy. Born: 1841, Ireland. Accredited to: Massachusetts. G.O. No.: 32, April 16, 1864.

Citation:

Off Yazoo City, Miss., March 5, 1864, embarking from the Marmora with a 12-pound howitzer mounted on a field carriage, Laffey landed with the gun and crew in the midst of heated battle and, bravely standing by his gun despite enemy rifle fire which cut the gun carriage and rammer, contributed to the turning back of the enemy during the fierce engagement.

== See also ==
- List of American Civil War Medal of Honor recipients: G–L
