= Dermott School District =

School district in Arkansas, United States

Address
- 525 East Speedway Street Dermott, Arkansas, 71638; United States

District information
- Type: Public
- Grades: PreK–12
- Superintendent: Kristi Ridgell
- Schools: 2
- NCES District ID: 0505170

Students and staff
- Students: 376
- Teachers: 36.49
- Staff: 33.42
- Student–teacher ratio: 10.3
- District mascot: The Mighty Ram
- Colors: Orange and black

Other information
- Website: dermott.k12.ar.us

Dermott School District is a school district headquartered in Dermott, Arkansas, United States. In Chicot County, it serves Dermott. A portion of the district extends into Desha County, where it serves Halley. Another portion extends into Drew County, where it includes Collins.

In 1979 the Collins and Selma school districts dissolved, with portions of the students going to the Dermott school district.

== Schools ==
- Dermott High School
- Dermott Elementary School
