= USS Tensas =

Gunboat of the United States Navy

- Tensas at Mound City, Illinois

History

United States
- Ordered: as Tom Sugg
- Laid down: date unknown
- Launched: in 1860 at Cincinnati, Ohio
- Acquired: 29 September 1863
- Commissioned: 1 January 1864; at Mound City, Illinois
- Decommissioned: 7 August 1865
- Stricken: 1865 (est.)
- Captured: by Union Navy forces; 14 August 1863
- Fate: Sold, 17 August 1865

General characteristics
- Displacement: 41 tons
- Length: 91 ft (28 m)
- Beam: 22 ft 5 in (6.83 m)
- Draught: depth of hold 3 ft 7 1/2 in (1.105 m); draft 4 ft (1.2 m)
- Propulsion: steam engine; side wheel-propelled
- Speed: not known
- Complement: not known
- Armament: two 24-pounder howitzers

USS Tensas was a small 41-ton steamer captured by the Union Navy during the American Civil War.

After Tensas was acquired by the Union Navy, she was outfitted with two large 24-pounder howitzers, a type of gun especially useful for riverbank bombardment, and was then sent to the Mississippi River Squadron for the duration of the war.

== Service with the Confederacy ==
Tom Sugg—a wooden-hulled side-wheel steamer built in 1860 at Cincinnati, Ohio—was outfitted as a side-wheel gunboat and served under the name Tom Sugg. She operated as a merchant river boat in Arkansas on the White River carrying cotton and general cargo. After the outbreak of the Civil War, she transported arms and horses for Confederate troops near the White River.

== Capture by Union Navy forces ==
On 14 August 1863, USS Cricket ascended the Little Red River and captured Tom Sugg and Kaskaskia at Searcy's Landing. This blow destroyed Confederate river transportation in northern Arkansas and ultimately diminished the flow of supplies to Southern troops east of the Mississippi River.

== Service with the Union Navy ==
The United States Navy Department purchased the side-wheel gunboat from the Illinois Prize Court on 29 September 1863, and she was commissioned as Tensas on 1 January 1864 at Mound City, Illinois, Acting Master E. C. Van Pelt in command.

== Post-war decommissioning ==
Tensas was decommissioned on 7 August 1865. She was sold at public auction on 17 August 1865 at Mound City, Illinois, to E. B. Trinidad.

== Discovery of Its Wreck? ==
In 2006 the remains of a sunken vessel believed to be the Tensas were found in Bayou Teche at New Iberia, Louisiana. (E. B. Trinidad, the person to whom the vessel had been sold in 1865, was a Bayou Teche steamboat captain.) Part of the vessel in question sits ashore on private land and part sits in state waters. Now an archaeological site, the ship's resting spot is protected by pilings.

== See also ==
- Confederate States Navy
- Anaconda Plan
