= USS Cricket =

Gunboat of the United States Navy

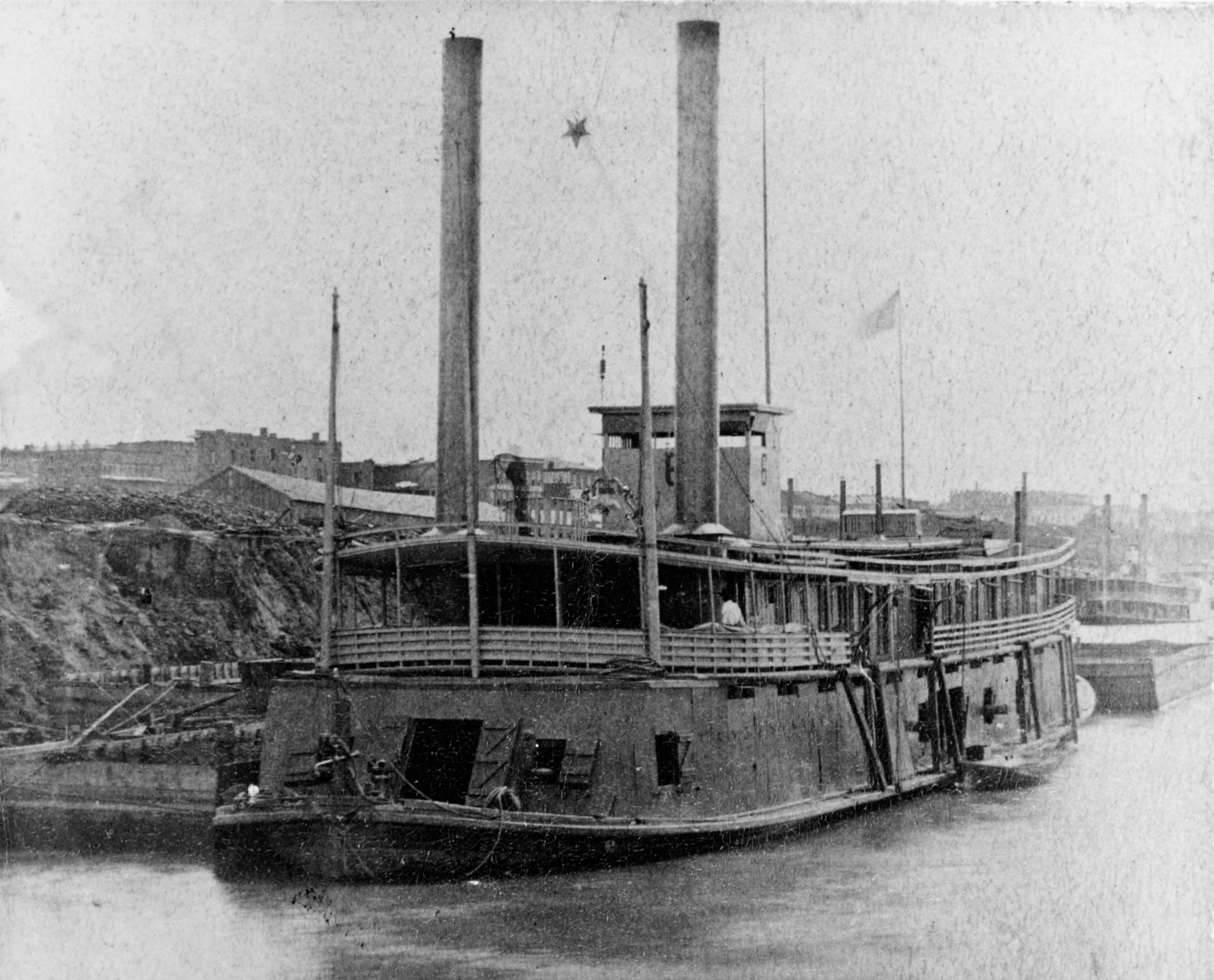
- USS Cricket (1863-1865, "Tinclad" # 6) Tied up at a Western Rivers city, during the last years of the Civil War, with a barge astern and a boat alongside. Note the decorative star suspended between her smokestacks.

History

United States
- Acquired: 18 November 1862
- Commissioned: 19 January 1863
- Decommissioned: 31 May 1864
- In service: 13 August 1864
- Out of service: 30 June 1865
- Fate: Sold 17 August 1865

General characteristics
- Displacement: 178 tons
- Length: 154 ft 1 in (46.96 m)
- Beam: 28 ft 2 in (8.59 m)
- Draught: 4 ft (1.2 m)
- Propulsion: steam engine; stern wheel-propelled
- Speed: 6 knots (11 km/h; 6.9 mph)
- Armament: six 24-pounder howitzers

USS Cricket was a steamer acquired by the Union Navy during the American Civil War.

Cricket—armed with six 24-pounder howitzers—was used by the Union Navy as a bombardment gunboat used to patrol navigable waterways of the Confederacy and to bombard riverside fortifications as required.

== Service history ==
Cricket, a stern-wheel steamer, was built at Pittsburgh, Pennsylvania; purchased 18 November 1862 at Cairo, Illinois, and commissioned 19 January 1863, Acting Master Amos R. Langthorne in command. Between 4 February and 7 April 1863, Cricket served on guard duty at Memphis, Tennessee, during which time she seized a quantity of cotton on Delta and Forest Queen on 15 March and landed it at Cairo. Reassigned to the White River Station between Memphis and the Arkansas River, Cricket patrolled the Mississippi River to prevent the crossing of Confederate troops and supplies and to keep the banks free from hidden batteries and guerrillas. She engaged a battery above Argyle Landing on 2 May and another near Greenville, Mississippi, on 4 May.

In August 1863 she joined USS Lexington and USS Marmora in an expedition up the White River. Cricket continued into the Little Red River and on 14 August captured the last two Confederate army transports in the area, Kaskaskia and Thomas Sugg, returning to the Mississippi River under frequent musket fire from Southern troops ashore. In November and December 1863 Cricket convoyed troop transports on the Tennessee River and cleared the river banks of guerrillas, as she supported Union Army movements. She then joined the naval forces on the Red River Station, and participated in an expedition up the Black and Ouachita Rivers in Louisiana from 29 February to 5 March 1864, supporting the Army.

Serving as flagship for Admiral David D. Porter, Cricket and her squadron ascended the river as far as Springfield Landing, Louisiana, when news of a Confederate victory at the Battle of Pleasant Hill, called them back to their station. Hampered by falling water and the difficulty of making sharp turns while going downstream with the current, the squadron was attacked again and again by Confederate troops as it returned to the Mississippi River. On 26 April Cricket fought off capture when a boarding attempt was made suddenly by 1,200 soldiers as she ran past a battery of 18 artillery pieces. She was struck 38 times and lost 12 killed and 19 wounded out of crew of fifty officers and men-1/3 of the crew were African Americans. She brought Admiral Porter safely to USS Black Hawk and sailed to Mound City for repairs. Out of commission from 31 May to 13 August 1864 when repairs were completed, Cricket returned to duty on the White River Station until the end of hostilities. She was decommissioned 30 June 1865 and sold 17 August 1865 at Mound City, Illinois.
