= Halley, Arkansas =

- Census-designated place
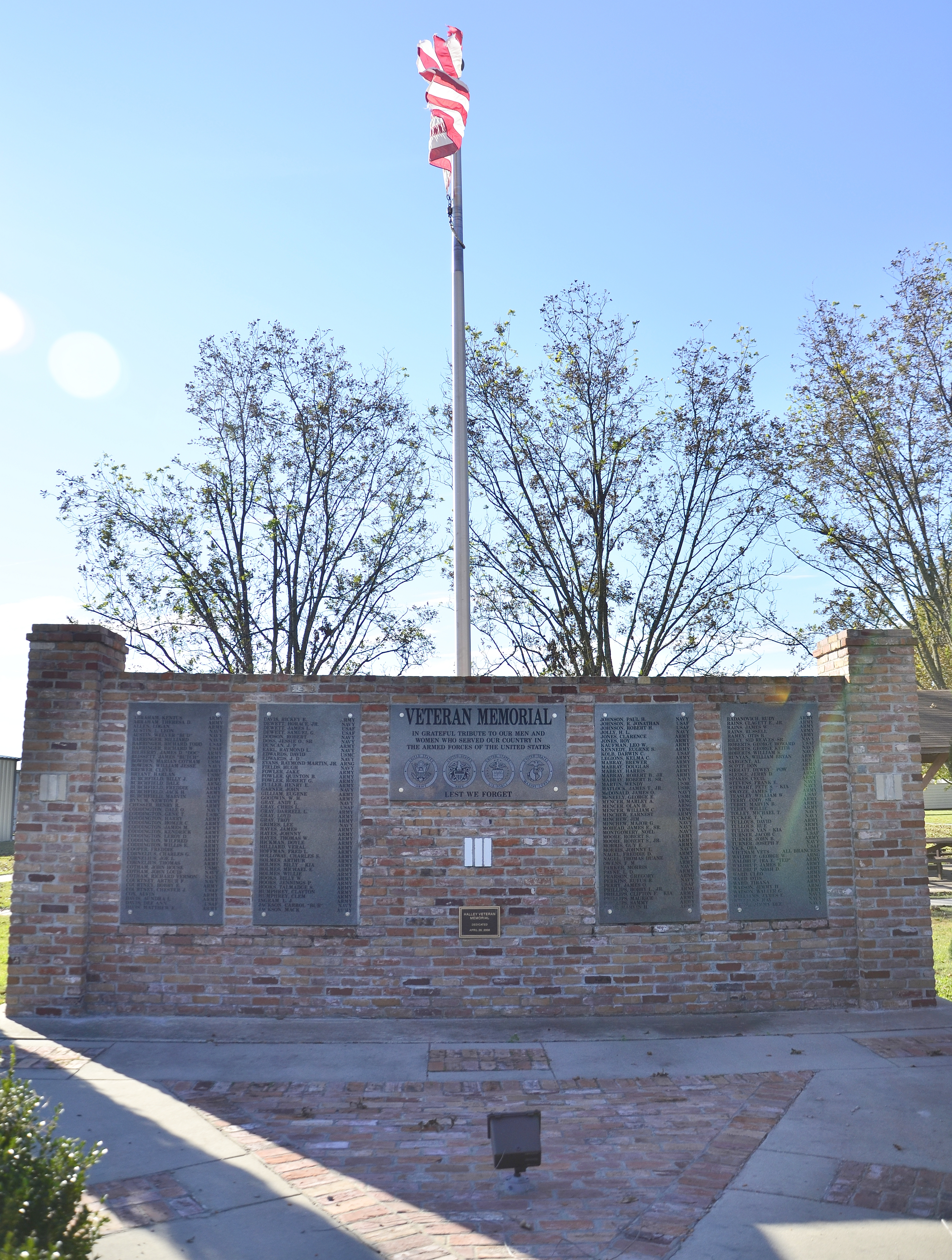
- Veteran's Memorial in Halley

- Halley's location in Arkansas
- Coordinates: 33°32′11″N 91°19′25″W
- Country: United States
- State: Arkansas
- County: Desha
- Elevation: 141 ft (43 m)

Population (2020)
  - Total: 44
- Time zone: UTC-6 (Central (CST))
  - Summer (DST): UTC-5 (CDT)
- GNIS feature ID: 2805650

Halley is an unincorporated community and census-designated place (CDP) in Desha County, Arkansas, United States. It was first listed as a CDP in the 2020 census with a population of 44.

== History ==
John J. Bowie (eldest brother of James Bowie) purchased land in the area in 1857.

Construction of the Mississippi, Ouachita and Red River Railroad—the first chartered railway in Arkansas—began in 1852, and 7 mi (11 km) of track had been laid west from Eunice by the start of the Civil War. The line passed through Bowie's land, and a stop there was called "Bowie Station". The railroad was completed after the war, but abandoned in 1875 after flooding on the Mississippi River damaged the railbed and bridges. Highway 208 between Eunice and Halley was built on the abandoned railbed.

Bowie Station was later renamed "Halley" after early settlers, the Halley family.

In 1901, a line of the Missouri Pacific Railroad was built through Halley.

== Demographics ==
Historical population
Census	Pop.	Note	%±
2020	44		—
U.S. Decennial Census; 2020

=== 2020 census ===
Halley CDP, Arkansas – racial and ethnic composition Note: the US Census treats Hispanic/Latino as an ethnic category. This table excludes Latinos from the racial categories and assigns them to a separate category. Hispanics/Latinos may be of any race.
Race / ethnicity (NH = Non-Hispanic)	Pop 2020	% 2020
White alone (NH)	28	63.64%
Black or African American alone (NH)	15	34.09%
Native American or Alaska Native alone (NH)	0	0.00%
Asian alone (NH)	0	0.00%
Pacific Islander alone (NH)	0	0.00%
Some other race alone (NH)	0	0.00%
Mixed-race or multi-racial (NH)	1	2.27%
Hispanic or Latino (any race)	0	0.00%
Total	44	100.00%

== Infrastructure ==
The Halley Volunteer Fire Department is located in the settlement.

== Education ==
Halley is in the Dermott School District.
