= Frank Stodart =

Australian rules footballer

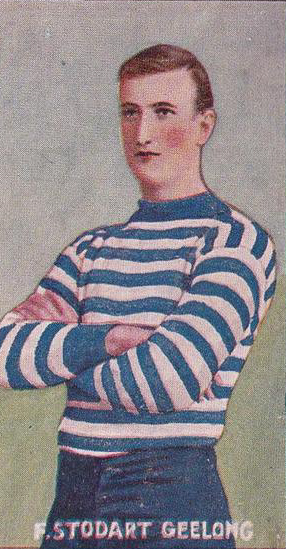
- Cigarette card of Stodart in 1907

Personal information
- Full name: Frank Lindsay Stodart
- Born: 10 March 1885; Yarck, Victoria
- Died: 27 February 1944 (aged 58); South Yarra, Victoria
- Original team: Geelong College

Playing career^{1}
Years	Club	Games (Goals)
1903–05, 1908	Geelong	30 (2)
- ^{1} Playing statistics correct to the end of 1908.

Frank Lindsay Stodart (10 March 1885 – 27 February 1944) was an Australian rules footballer who played with Geelong in the Victorian Football League (VFL).
