= Stoddard, Nebraska =

Ghost town in Nebraska, United States of America

Coordinates: 40.08890°N 97.61421°W

Stoddard is a ghost town in Thayer County, Nebraska, United States.

== History ==
Stoddard was a depot on the Chicago, Burlington and Quincy Railroad. A post office was established at Stoddard in 1886, and remained in operation until it was discontinued in 1934.
