= Stoddard engine =

Elliott J. Stoddard invented and patented two versions of the Stoddard engine, the first in 1919 and the second in 1933. The general engine classification is an external combustion engine with valves and single-phase gaseous working fluid (i.e. a "hot air engine"). The internal working fluid was originally air, although in modern versions, other gases such as helium or hydrogen may be used.

One potential thermodynamic advantage of using valves is to minimize the adverse effects of "unswept volume" in the heat exchangers (sometimes called "dead volume"), which is known to reduce engine efficiency and power output in the valveless Stirling engine.

== The 1919 Stoddard engine ==
The generalized thermodynamic processes of the 1919 Stoddard cycle are:

1. Adiabatic compression
2. Isobaric heat-addition
3. Adiabatic expansion
4. Isobaric heat-removal

The engine design in the patent was using a scotch yoke.

== The 1933 Stoddard engine ==
In the 1933 design, Stoddard reduced the internal volume of the heat exchangers maintaining the same generalized thermodynamic processes as the 1919 cycle.

== Gallery ==
Stoddard engine diagrams
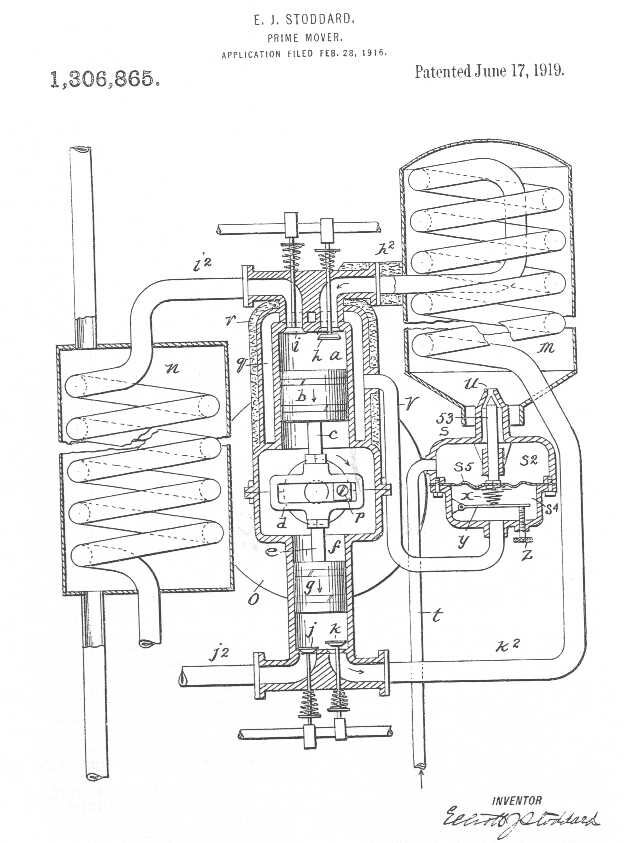
The 1919 Stoddard Engine

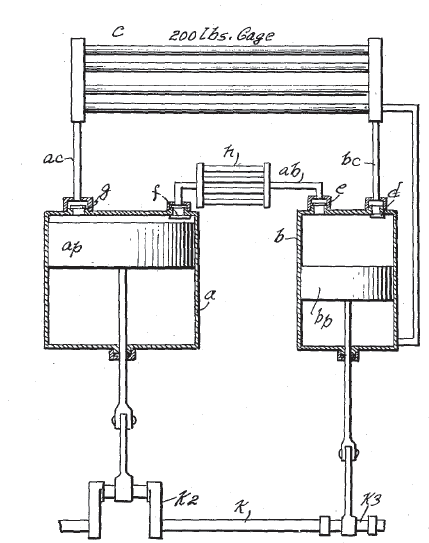
The 1933 Stoddard Engine
