= James Stoddard (Medal of Honor) =

- Born: 1838; Port Robinson, Upper Canada
- Died: Unknown
- Military career
- Allegiance: United States
- Branch: United States Navy
- Service years: 1863 - 1865
- Rank: Acting Master's Mate
- Unit: USS Marmora
- Conflicts: American Civil War
- Awards: Medal of Honor

James Stoddard (born 1838, date of death unknown) was a Union Navy sailor in the American Civil War and a recipient of the United States military's highest decoration, the Medal of Honor, for his actions during an engagement in Yazoo City, Mississippi.

Born in 1838 in Port Robinson, Upper Canada (in present-day Ontario), Stoddard enlisted in the U.S. Navy on September 21, 1863, in Detroit. By March 5, 1864, he was serving as a seaman on the USS Marmora. On that day, he was among a group of sailors who went ashore with a howitzer to help repulse a Confederate attack on Yazoo City, Mississippi. He and his comrades defended their gun against superior forces, often engaging in hand-to-hand combat. Stoddard was wounded in the neck during the action, but recovered and received the Medal of Honor and a promotion to acting master's mate on April 14, 1864. Two of his shipmates, Seaman William J. Franks and Seaman Bartlett Laffey, were also awarded the medal for being in the gun crew. He resigned from the Navy in May 1865.

Stoddard's official Medal of Honor citation reads:

Off Yazoo City, Miss., 5 March 1864. Embarking from the Marmora with a 12-pound howitzer mounted on a field carriage, Stoddard landed with the gun and crew in the midst of heated battle and, bravely standing by his gun despite enemy rifle fire which cut the gun carriage and rammer, contributed to the turning back of the enemy during the fierce engagement.

In 1944, the destroyer USS Stoddard (DD-566) was named in his honor.
