= USS Stoddard =

Fletcher-class destroyer

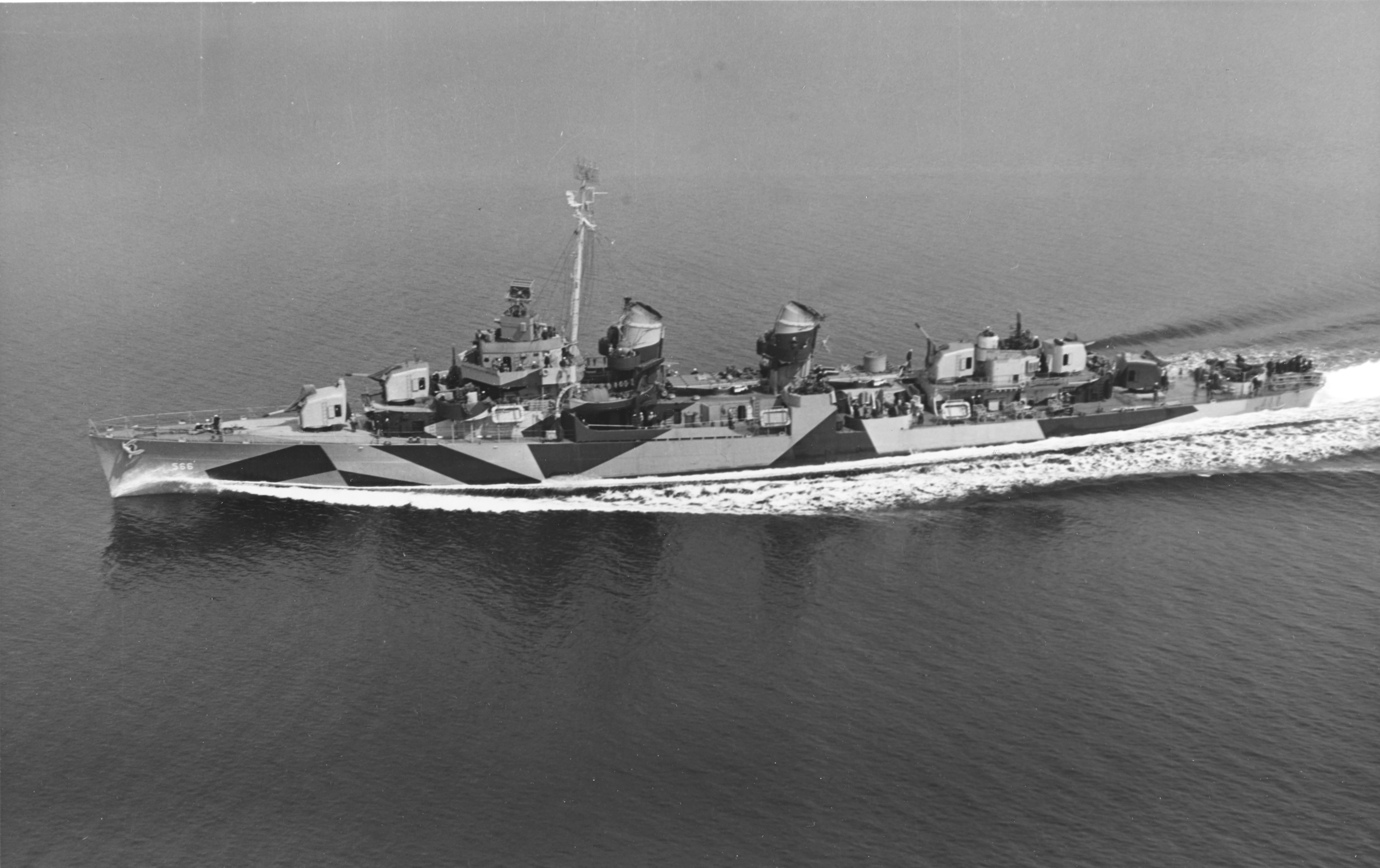
- USS Stoddard (DD-566) in April 1944

History

United States
- Namesake: James Stoddard
- Builder: Seattle-Tacoma Shipbuilding Corporation
- Laid down: 10 March 1943
- Launched: 19 November 1943
- Commissioned: 15 April 1944
- Decommissioned: 26 September 1969
- Stricken: 1 June 1975
- Fate: Sunk in an exercise, 22 July 1997

General characteristics
- Class & type: Fletcher-class destroyer
- Displacement: 2,050 tons
- Length: 376 ft 6 in (114.7 m)
- Beam: 39 ft 8 in (12.1 m)
- Draft: 17 ft 9 in (5.4 m)
- Propulsion: 60,000 shp (45 MW); 2 propellers
- Speed: 35 knots (65 km/h; 40 mph)
- Range: 6500 nmi. (12,000 km) at 15 kt
- Complement: 329
- Armament: 5 × 5 in (130 mm), 4 × 40 mm AA guns, 4 × 20 mm AA guns, 10 × 21 inch (533 mm) torpedo tubes, 6 × depth charge projectors, 2 × depth charge tracks

USS Stoddard (DD-566) was a Fletcher-class destroyer of the United States Navy, named for Master's Mate James Stoddard, who was awarded the Medal of Honor during the Civil War. She was the last Fletcher to be stricken from the U.S. Navy, in 1975.

Stoddard was laid down at Seattle, Washington, by the Seattle-Tacoma Shipbuilding Corp. on 10 March 1943; launched on 19 November 1943, sponsored by Mrs. Mildred Gould Holcomb; and commissioned on 15 April 1944.

== World War II ==
Following her shakedown training out of San Diego and post-shakedown availability at Seattle, Stoddard screened a convoy to Pearl Harbor, departing the west coast on 16 July and reaching Hawaii on the 29th. She entered another brief availability period at Pearl Harbor, then headed north. On 8 August, she arrived in Adak, Alaska, and joined Task Force 94 (TF 94), made up of light cruisers Trenton (CL-11), Concord (CL-10), Richmond (CL-9), and the destroyers of Destroyer Division 57 (DesDiv 57).

== North Pacific campaign ==
The mission of TF 94 was to harass Japanese outposts in the Kuril Islands, northeast of Japan proper and west of the Aleutian Islands. On 14 August 1944, Stoddard sailed with the task force to make her first offensive sweep of those forward enemy positions. Poor weather conditions forced the ships to abandon the mission. Task Force 94 was redesignated TF 92 between that first abortive mission and the second one, begun on 26 August. Foul weather again foiled the American attack, and the task force put into Attu. The storms were so bad and came so often that TF 92 did not successfully complete a raid until late November.

During the evening hours of 21 November, the cruisers and destroyers pounded the Japanese installations at Matsuwa, damaging the airfields and other installations heavily. Heavy winds and seas slowed TF 92's retirement speed to nine knots, but the bad weather also prevented pursuit by enemy aircraft. The warships returned safely to Attu on the 25th.

From Adak, DesDiv 113, including Stoddard, was routed to the submarine base at Dutch Harbor. After spending the first two weeks in December at Dutch Harbor, the destroyers put to sea on the 13th and rejoined TF 92. On 3 January 1945, the task force embarked upon another sweep of Japan's Kuril defenses. Two days later, under the cover of snow squalls but with calm seas, the task force bombarded the Suribachi Wan area of Paramushiro, severely damaging canning installations and airfields. TF 92 retired to Attu at high speed and returned to Dutch Harbor on the 13th for a ten-day recreation period.

On 16 January, Stoddard and Rowe (DD-564) headed south for operational training in the Hawaiian Islands. They arrived at Pearl Harbor on the 22d and departed on 7 February to return to Attu. They reached Massacre Bay on 13 February, just in time to join the group headed for the bombardment of Kurabu Zaki. The ships put to sea on 16 February and arrived off Paramushiro just after sunset on the 18th. They bombarded the island until midnight and then retired to Attu, where they arrived on the 20th. Three days later, they shifted to Adak for supplies and repairs. They returned to Attu on 8 March. On 15 March, they hit Matsuwa again. From 1 to 17 April, Stoddard joined the task force in exercises in the vicinity of Adak. On the 18th, she and the rest of DesDiv 13 bade farewell to the cold winds and waters of the Aleutians chain.

== Battle of Okinawa ==
Stoddard entered Pearl Harbor for the third time on 24 April 1945. For almost a month, her crew enjoyed recreation in the islands and conducted operational training in preparation for assignment to Okinawa and the Fast Carrier Task Force. Stoddard sailed from Pearl Harbor on 11 May, in the screen of Ticonderoga (CV-14), bound for Ulithi. Along the way, Ticonderoga's air group got in a little live-ammunition practice on 17 May, when they struck the Japanese forces isolated on Taroa and the other islets of Maleolap Atoll. The task group reached the lagoon at Ulithi on 22 May. A week later, Stoddard departed the atoll to take up station off Okinawa.

On 2 June, she arrived off Okinawa and took up radar picket station. Though the Okinawa campaign was rapidly nearing its conclusion, the proximity of airfields in Japan and on Formosa allowed enemy air power to continue to harass the ships around the island. Although the initial intensity of Japanese suicide plane attacks had abated, such attacks continued in significant numbers. Stoddard covered the withdrawal of several cargo ships on 4 June during a typhoon-evasion maneuver; then returned to her station. At sunset on 7 June, two suicide planes attacked, but both were sent hurtling into the sea before they could reach the ships. During her tour of duty on the picket line, Stoddard claimed two Japanese planes for herself, two assists, and one probable kill.

She left Okinawa on 17 June in the screen of Mississippi (BB-41). Three days later, she passed through Surigao Strait into Leyte Gulf. For the remainder of the month, she underwent repairs and took on provisions at San Pedro Bay. She put to sea again on 1 July, this time in the screen of TF 38, the Fast Carrier Task Force. For the next 45 days, she guarded the carriers as their planes made repeated strikes on the Japanese home islands. Stoddard was detached once during that period of time, on 23 July, to join DesDiv 113 in a bombardment of Chi Chi Jima in the Bonins. After the cessation of hostilities on 15 August, she continued to cruise the waters near Japan with TF 38 to cover the occupation forces. She cleared Japanese waters from 21 September until 7 October, while she underwent availability at Eniwetok, then returned for training exercises until November.

On 18 November, she departed Japan for the United States. She transited the Panama Canal a month later and arrived at Philadelphia Navy Yard two days before Christmas. Stoddard went through a yard overhaul until late March 1946, then ferried personnel to Charleston, S.C., in April. She began inactivation overhaul at Charleston Navy Yard on 8 July and was placed out of commission in January 1947.

== 1950–1965 ==
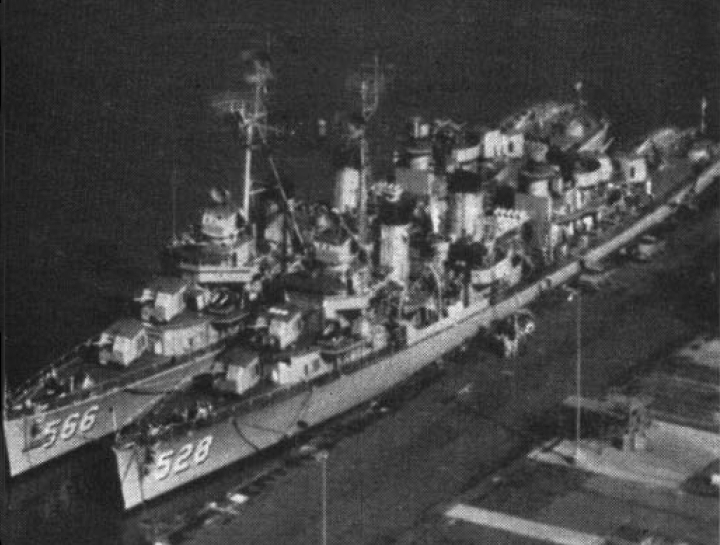
Mullany (DD-528) and Stoddard at Pearl Harbor, in 1960.

Stoddard remained inactive, berthed with the Charleston Group of the Atlantic Reserve Fleet, until November 1950, when she was reactivated. She was recommissioned on 9 March 1951. She fitted out at Charleston and Newport, R.I., and then conducted shakedown cruises at Newport and Guantanamo Bay, Cuba. Stoddard alternated deployments with the 6th Fleet in the Mediterranean Sea with overhauls at Philadelphia and operations along the Atlantic seaboard of the United States until December 1954, when she transited the Panama Canal and joined the Pacific Fleet.

In January 1955, she embarked upon her first deployment to the western Pacific since World War II. Soon after her arrival, she participated in the evacuation of Chinese Nationalists from the Tachen Islands. Following that operation, she served on the Taiwan Strait patrol. Stoddard followed a schedule of deployments to the Far East alternated with west coast operations throughout the remainder of her career. During the first 10 years, she concentrated on the South China Sea-Taiwan Strait area because that was the major trouble spot for the United States in the western Pacific, although in 1961, the Laotian crisis brought her to the southeast Asia area, where she would soon concentrate all her efforts. During her time in port in San Diego, she appeared in the 1963 movie A Ticklish Affair.

== Vietnam War, 1965–1968 ==
On 4 June 1965, Stoddard departed from San Diego to begin her annual tour of duty in Asian waters; but this deployment was different. By mid-June, she was operating along the coast of Vietnam, principally providing gunfire support to American and Army of the Republic of Vietnam (ARVN) troops operating ashore against the forces of the Viet Cong (VC) insurgents and their allies, the People's Army of Vietnam (PAVN) regulars. On 28–29 July 1965, she joined USS John R. Craig in giving naval gunfire support to a Marine Corps unit—Hotel Company, 3rd platoon, 2nd Battalion, 3rd Marines north of Da Nang. At night with danger close, Craig fired 348 5-inch rounds, and Stoddard fired 148 rounds, saving Marines on and near the beach as well as a battalion of the ARVN 2nd Regional Force, who were badly outnumbered and threatened with being overrun. In doing so the ships effectively destroyed the VC 7th Battalion engaging Marines on the Ca De River Bridge and the northern sector of Da Nang. After maintenance in Japan and a rest and relaxation period in Hong Kong, Stoddard joined USS Independence on Yankee Station to serve as plane-guard for the pilots flying missions inland and as a screening unit for the carrier herself. By early November, she was back in Japan, preparing to return to America. She departed Sasebo on the 5th and reached San Diego on the 24th.

Stoddard spent the next twelve months operating with the 1st Fleet in the waters off the west coast of the United States. Her primary mission was to maintain operational readiness through training, which ran the gamut from antisubmarine warfare exercises to bombardment drills. On 5 November 1966, the destroyer left San Diego for Pearl Harbor and the western Pacific. She spent two days, 10 and 11 November, in port at Pearl Harbor before continuing on to Japan. She reached Yokosuka on 20 November and remained there until the 26th, when she got underway for Subic Bay in the Philippines.

This deployment, like the previous one, was given over entirely to naval support for the American and South Vietnamese forces fighting against the VC/PAVN. The second tour lasted from 2 December 1966 to 4 January 1967 and consisted entirely of plane guard duty with USS Kitty Hawk in the Gulf of Tonkin. After repairs and upkeep at Subic Bay, Stoddard returned to Yankee Station on 17 January. For almost a month, she cruised on Tết Holiday patrol and participated in Operation Sea Dragon, the interdiction of enemy waterborne and coastal logistics operations. During this month, she sank 26 small waterborne logistics craft and dueled with shore batteries a number of times.

On 16 February 1967, she returned to Subic Bay for maintenance and, after four days, got underway for a rest and relaxation period at Hong Kong. The destroyer returned to Yankee Station on 3 March for her third and final line tour of this deployment. Following five days of plane-guard duty for Kitty Hawk, Stoddard resumed Operation Sea Dragon operations. This line period brought about a change in the focus of Sea Dragon. Not only did the operation become more important to the war effort, but a subtle shift in target emphasis required an ever-increasing amount of shore bombardment and counter-battery fire. Stoddard destroyed radar installations and ammunition dumps, pounded staging areas, and silenced shore batteries. The latter, however, scored some minor success on 17 March, when Stoddard assisted in the rescue of a downed American near the mouth of the Song Giap River. She came under intense fire from a battery ashore and sustained one direct hit. She spent the last five days of this line period as plane guard for USS Hancock.

After stopping at Sasebo and Yokosuka, Stoddard got underway on 20 April to return to the United States. Heading via Midway Island and Pearl Harbor, she arrived at San Diego on 5 May. She spent the remainder of May and the month of June training U.S. Naval Academy midshipmen; then resumed local operations until 22 September, when she entered Long Beach Naval Shipyard for overhaul. She completed an overhaul on 19 December 1967 and returned to local operations out of San Diego on the following day.

On 10 June 1968, Stoddard joined USS Richmond K. Turner and USS Ingersoll for her last Westpac Cruise. She arrived at Hawaii on 16 June. After fuel stops at Midway and Guam islands, she arrived at Subic Bay in the Philippines on 3 July. Stoddard was a plane guard for the carrier USS America in the Gulf of Tonkin and provided gunfire support for troops ashore in the vicinity of Huế, South Vietnam. After stops in Kaohsiung, Taiwan, Hong Kong, and Sasebo, Japan, Stoddard returned home on 7 December 1968.

== 1969–1997 ==
Stoddard served the U.S. Navy actively until September 1969. She operated with the 1st Fleet along the West Coast during the remainder of this time. In September 1969, she was decommissioned and placed in the Pacific Reserve Fleet at Mare Island, California. Stoddard was struck from the naval Vessel Registry on 1 June 1975, being the last Fletcher-class destroyer to be struck.

On 30 June 1976, Stoddard was transferred from the inactive ship facility, Mare Island, California, to the Pacific Missile Test Center at Point Mugu. The required equipment removals were accomplished, and the ship was modified to perform a new service. During the next few years she served as a target in various weapons test programs, including the Tomahawk Project. Having survived this first group of test assignments, Stoddard was given a new challenge. In November 1983, a Block 0 Phalanx went aboard the Stoddard for the first time. In November 1984, Stoddard returned to Port Hueneme. In June 1985, Stoddard again set sail, this time with a Block I Baseline 0 Phalanx to protect her. After facing supersonic diving targets, she again returned to Port Hueneme, unscathed, in September 1985. The tests continued into the winter of 1989-1990. During the testing, Stoddard was subjected to attack by no less than forty-three targets, from subsonic BQM drones to supersonic MQM-8 Vandal missiles.

== Fate ==
Stoddard was towed by USNS Sioux (T-ATF-171) to an assigned position near the island of Kauai, Hawaii. Seal Team One installed charges, which sank her 64 nautical miles (119 km; 74 mi) NNW of the island of Kauai, Hawaii, in the Barking Sands Missile Range on 22 July 1997. The ship lies at a depth of 2,550 fathoms (15,300 ft; 4,660 m).

== Honors ==
Stoddard earned three battle stars for World War II and three battle stars for the Vietnam War.
