= Dermott, Arkansas =

- City
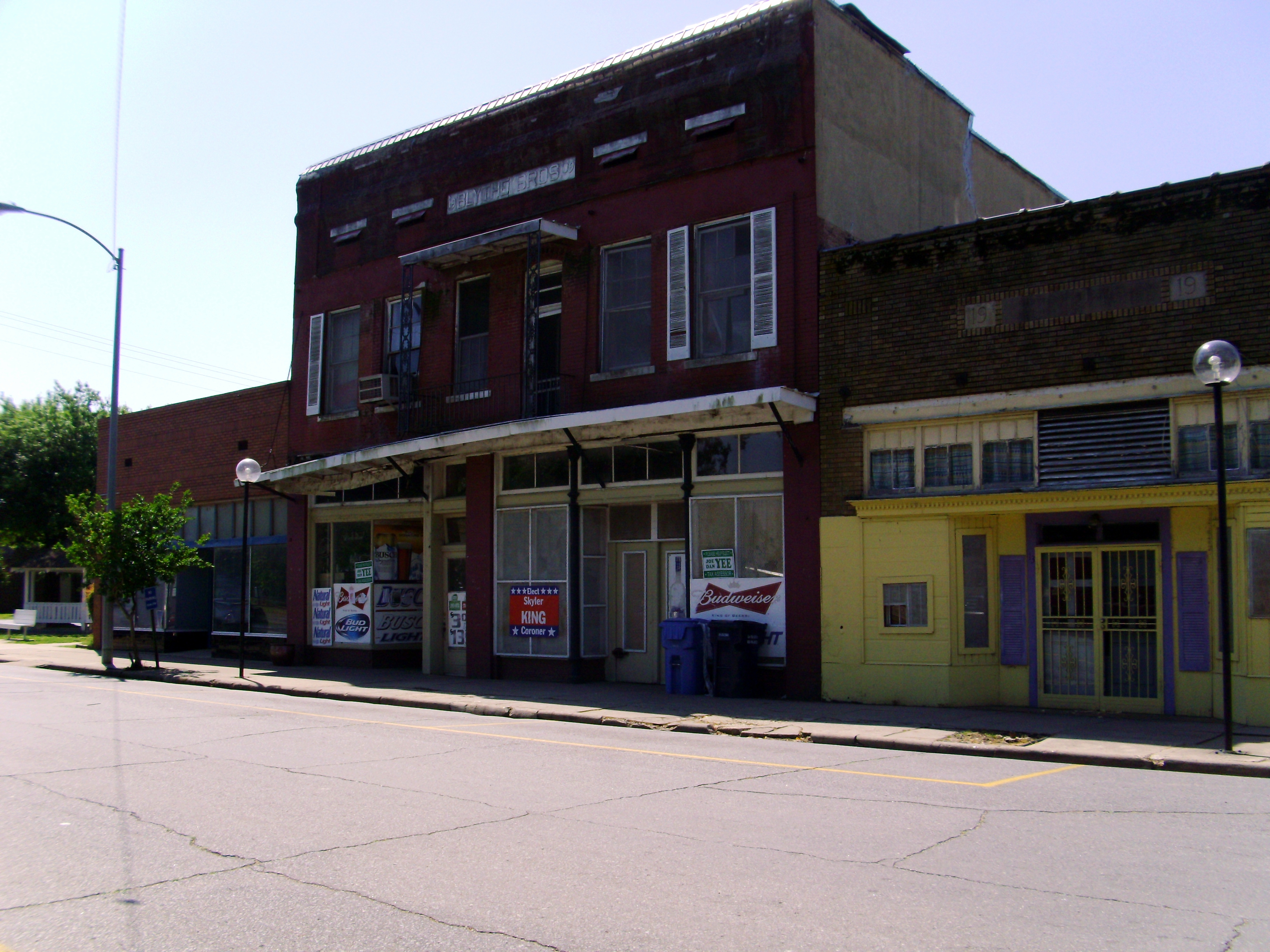
- Downtown Dermott

- Location of Dermott in Chicot County, Arkansas
- Coordinates: 33°31′38″N 91°25′57″W
- Country: United States
- State: Arkansas
- County: Chicot

Area
  - Total: 3.49 sq mi (9.05 km^{2})
  - Land: 3.42 sq mi (8.86 km^{2})
  - Water: 0.073 sq mi (0.19 km^{2})
- Elevation: 141 ft (43 m)

Population (2020)
  - Total: 2,021
  - Estimate (2025): 2,412 ▲
  - Density: 590.7/sq mi (228.08/km^{2})
- Time zone: UTC-6 (Central (CST))
  - Summer (DST): UTC-5 (CDT)
- ZIP code: 71638
- Area code: 870
- FIPS code: 05-18520
- GNIS feature ID: 2404221

Dermott is a city in Chicot County, Arkansas, United States incorporated in 1890. The population was 2,021 at the 2020 census.

== Geography ==
Dermott is located in the northwest corner of Chicot County at 33°31′43″N 91°26′16″W (33.528712, -91.437657). Bayou Bartholomew, a tributary of the Ouachita River, touches the southwest corner of the city. U.S. Route 165 passes southeast of the city center, leading north 9 miles (14 km) to McGehee and south 15 miles (24 km) to Montrose. Arkansas Highway 35 passes through the center of Dermott and leads northwest 23 miles (37 km) to Monticello.

According to the United States Census Bureau, Dermott has a total area of 3.6 square miles (9.4 km^{2}), of which 3.6 square miles (9.2 km^{2}) is land and 0.08 square miles (0.2 km^{2}), or 1.97%, is water.

=== Climate ===
The climate in this area is characterized by hot, humid summers and generally mild to cool winters. According to the Köppen Climate Classification system, Dermott has a humid subtropical climate, abbreviated "Cfa" on climate maps.

Climate data for Dermott, Arkansas (1991–2020 normals, extremes 1940–2020)
Month	Jan	Feb	Mar	Apr	May	Jun	Jul	Aug	Sep	Oct	Nov	Dec	Year
Record high °F (°C)	81 (27)	85 (29)	89 (32)	95 (35)	99 (37)	106 (41)	107 (42)	107 (42)	106 (41)	98 (37)	88 (31)	83 (28)	107 (42)
Mean maximum °F (°C)	72.0 (22.2)	76.1 (24.5)	82.2 (27.9)	87.0 (30.6)	92.8 (33.8)	96.4 (35.8)	99.0 (37.2)	99.8 (37.7)	97.4 (36.3)	91.9 (33.3)	81.7 (27.6)	74.2 (23.4)	100.9 (38.3)
Mean daily maximum °F (°C)	50.8 (10.4)	55.4 (13.0)	64.1 (17.8)	73.1 (22.8)	81.6 (27.6)	88.3 (31.3)	91.0 (32.8)	91.0 (32.8)	86.2 (30.1)	76.1 (24.5)	63.2 (17.3)	53.3 (11.8)	72.8 (22.7)
Daily mean °F (°C)	42.4 (5.8)	46.3 (7.9)	54.6 (12.6)	63.1 (17.3)	71.7 (22.1)	78.8 (26.0)	81.4 (27.4)	80.5 (26.9)	74.9 (23.8)	64.2 (17.9)	53.0 (11.7)	44.9 (7.2)	63.0 (17.2)
Mean daily minimum °F (°C)	34.0 (1.1)	37.1 (2.8)	45.0 (7.2)	53.2 (11.8)	61.8 (16.6)	69.3 (20.7)	71.8 (22.1)	70.0 (21.1)	63.7 (17.6)	52.3 (11.3)	42.7 (5.9)	36.6 (2.6)	53.1 (11.7)
Mean minimum °F (°C)	19.0 (−7.2)	23.4 (−4.8)	27.1 (−2.7)	37.9 (3.3)	47.5 (8.6)	59.3 (15.2)	64.8 (18.2)	61.9 (16.6)	49.1 (9.5)	35.8 (2.1)	25.8 (−3.4)	22.4 (−5.3)	16.7 (−8.5)
Record low °F (°C)	1 (−17)	−2 (−19)	13 (−11)	27 (−3)	36 (2)	43 (6)	52 (11)	51 (11)	32 (0)	25 (−4)	15 (−9)	−3 (−19)	−3 (−19)
Average precipitation inches (mm)	5.52 (140)	5.40 (137)	5.45 (138)	6.06 (154)	4.97 (126)	4.00 (102)	3.85 (98)	3.01 (76)	3.14 (80)	4.42 (112)	4.46 (113)	5.99 (152)	56.27 (1,428)
Average snowfall inches (cm)	0.5 (1.3)	0.5 (1.3)	0.3 (0.76)	0.0 (0.0)	0.0 (0.0)	0.0 (0.0)	0.0 (0.0)	0.0 (0.0)	0.0 (0.0)	0.0 (0.0)	0.0 (0.0)	0.0 (0.0)	1.3 (3.36)
Average precipitation days (≥ 0.01 in)	9.7	8.9	9.6	8.3	9.1	7.4	7.2	6.6	5.5	6.1	7.5	9.3	95.2
Average snowy days (≥ 0.1 in)	0.2	0.3	0.1	0.0	0.0	0.0	0.0	0.0	0.0	0.0	0.0	0.0	0.6
Source: NOAAIEM

== Demographics ==
Historical population
Census	Pop.	Note	%±
1900	467		—
1910	1,662		255.9%
1920	2,330		40.2%
1930	2,942		26.3%
1940	3,083		4.8%
1950	3,601		16.8%
1960	3,665		1.8%
1970	4,250		16.0%
1980	4,731		11.3%
1990	4,715		−0.3%
2000	3,292		−30.2%
2010	2,316		−29.6%
2020	2,021		−12.7%
2025 (est.)	2,412	▲	19.3%
U.S. Decennial Census; 2014 Estimate

=== 2020 census ===
As of the 2020 census, Dermott had a population of 2,021. The median age was 44.1 years. 24.2% of residents were under the age of 18 and 21.7% of residents were 65 years of age or older. For every 100 females there were 86.8 males, and for every 100 females age 18 and over there were 77.3 males age 18 and over.

0.0% of residents lived in urban areas, while 100.0% lived in rural areas.

There were 856 households in Dermott, including 547 families. Of all households, 28.9% had children under the age of 18 living in them. 25.1% were married-couple households, 22.0% were households with a male householder and no spouse or partner present, and 47.0% were households with a female householder and no spouse or partner present. About 36.7% of all households were made up of individuals, and 14.6% had someone living alone who was 65 years of age or older.

There were 1,135 housing units, of which 24.6% were vacant. The homeowner vacancy rate was 1.5% and the rental vacancy rate was 15.6%.

Racial composition as of the 2020 census
Race	Number	Percent
White	349	17.3%
Black or African American	1,579	78.1%
American Indian and Alaska Native	6	0.3%
Asian	10	0.5%
Native Hawaiian and Other Pacific Islander	0	0.0%
Some other race	18	0.9%
Two or more races	59	2.9%
Hispanic or Latino (of any race)	27	1.3%

=== 2010 census ===
As of the 2010 United States census, there were 2,889 people living in the city. 77.8% were African American, 20.2% White, 0.1% Native American, 0.7% Asian, 0.1% from some other race and 1.0% from two or more races. 1.0% were Hispanic or Latino of any race.

=== 2000 census ===
As of the census of 2000, there were 4865 people, 1,216 households, and 824 families living in the city. The population density was 1,165.3 inhabitants per square mile (449.9/km^{2}). There were 1,404 housing units at an average density of 497.0 per square mile (191.9/km^{2}). The racial makeup of the city was 25.24% White, 73.27% Black or African American, 0.15% Native American, 0.30% Asian, 0.06% from other races, and 0.97% from two or more races. 0.76% of the population were Hispanic or Latino of any race.

There were 1,216 households, out of which 29.9% had children under the age of 18 living with them, 36.2% were married couples living together, 27.7% had a female householder with no husband present, and 32.2% were non-families. 28.8% of all households were made up of individuals, and 14.3% had someone living alone who was 65 years of age or older. The average household size was 2.59 and the average family size was 3.21.

In the city, the population was spread out, with 29.0% under the age of 18, 8.7% from 18 to 24, 24.1% from 25 to 44, 22.5% from 45 to 64, and 15.7% who were 65 years of age or older. The median age was 36 years. For every 100 females, there were 81.6 males. For every 100 females age 18 and over, there were 78.6 males.

The median income for a household in the city was $17,857, and the median income for a family was $22,214. Males had a median income of $21,134 versus $17,318 for females. The per capita income for the city was $9,998. About 25.9% of families and 32.5% of the population were below the poverty line, including 43.0% of those under age 18 and 22.4% of those age 65 or over.

== Arts and culture ==
=== Annual cultural events ===
The Dermott Crawfish Festival was one of the oldest festivals in Arkansas. The festival was held annually on the third weekend in May and was sponsored by the Dermott Chamber of Commerce. From 1996 through 2006, the Texas artist Larry D. Alexander, a native of Dermott, usually ended his Arkansas Schools Tours with a two-day art exhibit and print signing there at the festival. The Crawfish Festival was typically a food and music festival. In 2006, a car/truck/rim show was added to the festival. The festival also hosted a carnival during the entire week. Other events included the annual Rotary Club pancake breakfast, bingo, a horseshoe pitching contest, an antique tractor show, and multiple cash drawings.

In 2012 the Dermott Chamber of Commerce cancelled the Dermott Crawfish Festival, and no longer sponsors this event. Community leaders and African American business owners formed a committee to continue the spirit of the community, and now host the Dermott Community Festival.

== Education ==
Dermott School District operates public schools in the community. Dermott High School's colors are orange and black. They are the home of the Mighty Rams. The boys' basketball team won state basketball championships in 1986, 1989, 1991 and 1994. For 2012–14, the Dermott Rams belonged to the 2A Region 7 West conference. For its first championship in 1986, Dermott went undefeated (35-0) and won the overall state championship, coached by Willie Parker and Leroy Kennedy. The Rams have been in the top in the 2-AA class, but have not made a playoff run since 2000, when they made it to the championship game. Dermott has four state championships and numerous regional and tournament championships.

The Southeast Arkansas Public Library operates the Dermott Branch Library.

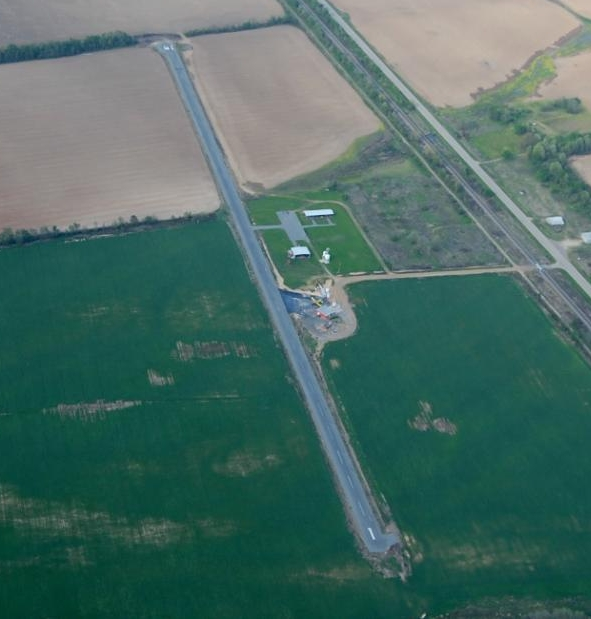
Dermott Municipal Airport

== History ==
During World War II, Dermott was the site of one of several camps holding German prisoners of war.

== Notable people ==
- Larry D. Alexander, visual artist and writer
- Robert L. Hill, founder of the Progressive Farmers and Household Union of America
- Art Kaufman, defensive coordinator, California Golden Bears football
- Samuel L. Kountz, kidney transplant surgeon
- Zilner Randolph, jazz musician
- Thane Read, global peace activist
