= Thomas E. Corcoran =

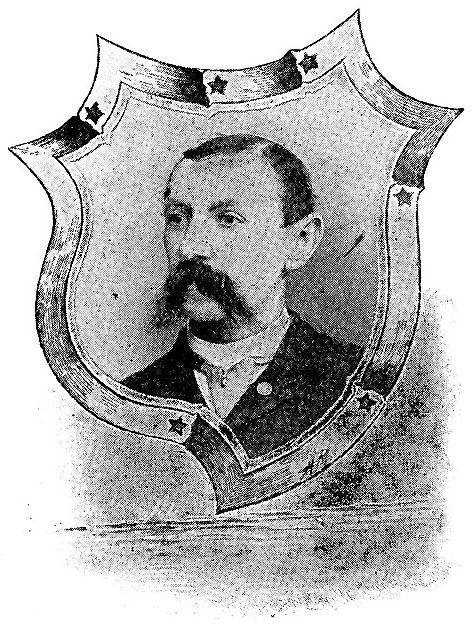
- Thomas E. Corcoran
- Born: October 12, 1839; Dublin, Ireland
- Died: March 12, 1904 (aged 64)
- Burial place: Calvary Cemetery, Woodside, Queens, New York
- Military career
- Allegiance: United States; Union
- Branch: United States Navy; Union Navy
- Service years: 1861 - 1865
- Rank: Landsman
- Units: USS Santee; USS Cincinnati; USS Lexington
- Conflicts: American Civil War • Siege of Vicksburg
- Awards: Medal of Honor

Thomas E. Corcoran (October 12, 1839 – March 12, 1904) was a Union Navy sailor in the American Civil War and a recipient of the United States military's highest decoration, the Medal of Honor, for his actions during the Siege of Vicksburg. He was awarded the medal for rescuing his crewmates during the sinking of his ship, the USS Cincinnati, in the Mississippi River. Under heavy fire from a Confederate artillery battery, Corcoran and three other men swam back and forth between the riverbank and the sinking ship, helping crewmen who could not swim reach shore. The four men then towed a small boat, carrying wounded sailors and the ship's commander, to the safety of Union forces.

== Biography ==
Corcoran was born in Dublin, Ireland, October 12, 1839. He enlisted from New York for a three-year term of service in the U.S. Navy on May 12, 1861, one month after the start of the American Civil War. Assigned first as a landsman to the USS North Carolina, he later transferred to the USS Santee and reached the rank of able seaman. Because the crew of the Santee began to fall ill with scurvy, Corcoran was discharged from the Navy on September 10, 1862, less than half-way through his enlistment. He re-enlisted the next month, on October 22, again for a three-year term, and was posted as a landsman to Cincinnati for service on the upper Mississippi River.

On May 27, 1863, during the Siege of Vicksburg, Mississippi, Cincinnati was ordered to steam down the Mississippi River and destroy two Confederate artillery guns which were impeding the advance of General William Tecumseh Sherman's right flank. Between Cincinnati and the two guns was a Confederate eleven-piece heavy artillery battery which, from its position atop a bluff, had command over that entire stretch of the river. The Union forces had been aware of the battery, but, shortly before Cincinnati received its orders, the battery had disappeared and was assumed to have been moved elsewhere. Unbeknownst to them, the battery's guns had been removed from view by simply lowering them from their carriages, both to protect them from the fire of ships on the river and to deceive the Union forces. The commander of the battery had discovered the Union signal code, and when he intercepted a message describing Cincinnati's mission, he had the guns re-assembled during the night and concealed them in brush.

On the morning of May 27, Cincinnati headed downstream and reached its target, the two artillery guns. Just as it fired its first shots, the hidden battery on the bluff also opened fire, completely surprising the Union ship. The first Confederate shell scored a direct hit, passing through Cincinnati's magazine and exiting through the bottom of the ship. Another shell disabled the ship's steering mechanism. Cincinnati's own guns could not be elevated enough to return fire on the high battery. Knowing his ship was doomed, the commander, Lieutenant George M. Bache, headed Cincinnati full-steam back up the river in search of a place on which to beach the ship. A suitable spot being found, Cincinnati was run aground, a hawser tied to a tree, and gangplank laid out. Before the men could evacuate, the hawser came loose and the ship slipped from the bank out into the river, where it began to sink in about 18 feet (5.5 m) of water. Many of the crew, including the commander, could not swim; those who could, including Corcoran, began to abandon ship. Still under intense fire, Corcoran and three others, Boatswain's Mate Henry Dow, Seaman Thomas Jenkins, and Seaman Martin McHugh, swam back and forth, helping their crewmates to shore. They then reboarded Cincinnati, hastily repaired a small boat which had been damaged by the Confederate fire, and loaded it with men who were too badly wounded to be dragged through the water. After Lieutenant Bache also climbed into the boat, they towed it to the safety of a Union flotilla. For these actions, Corcoran was awarded the Medal of Honor a month and a half later, on July 10, 1863. The other three swimmers, Dow, Jenkins, and McHugh, and two more Cincinnati crewmen also received the medal for their part in the action.

After the sinking of Cincinnati, Corcoran was transferred to the USS Lexington to finish out his term of service. He died March 12, 1904, at age 64 and was buried at Calvary Cemetery in Woodside, Queens, New York.

== Medal of Honor citation ==
Rank and organization: Landsman, U.S. Navy. Born: 1838, New York. Accredited to: New York. G.O. No.: 17, July 10, 1863.

Citation:

Served on board the U.S.S. Cincinnati during the attack on the Vicksburg batteries and at the time of her sinking. Engaging the enemy in a fierce battle, the Cincinnati, amidst an incessant fire of shot and shell, continued to fire her guns to the last, though so penetrated by shellfire that her fate was sealed. Serving bravely during this action, Corcoran was conspicuously cool under the fire of the enemy, never ceasing to fight until this proud ship went down, "her colors nailed to the mast."

== See also ==
- List of American Civil War Medal of Honor recipients: A–F
