= Thomas Jenkins (Medal of Honor) =

- Navy version of the Medal of Honor
- Born: c. 1831; Australia
- Died: Unknown
- Military career
- Allegiance: United States; Union
- Branch: United States Navy; Union Navy
- Service years: 1861 - 1863
- Rank: Seaman
- Unit: USS Cincinnati
- Conflicts: American Civil War; Siege of Vicksburg
- Awards: Medal of Honor

Thomas Jenkins (c. 1831 – unknown) was a Union Navy sailor in the American Civil War and a recipient of the United States military's highest decoration, the Medal of Honor, for his actions during the Siege of Vicksburg. He was awarded the medal for rescuing his crewmates during the sinking of his ship, the USS Cincinnati, in the Mississippi River. Under heavy fire from a Confederate artillery battery, Jenkins and three other men swam back and forth between the riverbank and the sinking ship, helping crewmen who could not swim reach shore. The four men then towed a small boat, carrying wounded sailors and the ship's commander, to the safety of Union forces.

== Biography ==
Jenkins was born in Australia in about 1831, and later immigrated to the United States, enlisting in the US Navy from New York in 1861. During the Civil War, Jenkins served as a seaman on the ironclad USS Cincinnati. On May 27, 1863, during the Siege of Vicksburg, Mississippi, the Cincinnati was ordered to steam down the Mississippi River and destroy two Confederate artillery guns which were impeding the advance of General William Tecumseh Sherman's right flank. Between the Cincinnati and the two guns was a Confederate eleven-piece heavy artillery battery which, from its position atop a bluff, had command over that entire stretch of the river. The Union forces had been aware of the battery, but, shortly before the Cincinnati received its orders, the battery had disappeared and was assumed to have been moved elsewhere. Unbeknown to them, the battery's guns had been removed from view by simply lowering them from their carriages, both to protect them from the fire of ships on the river and to deceive the Union forces. The commander of the battery had discovered the Union signal code, and when he intercepted a message describing the Cincinnati's mission, he had the guns re-assembled during the night and concealed them in brush.

On the morning of May 27, the Cincinnati headed downstream and reached its target, the two artillery guns. Just as it fired its first shots, the hidden battery on the bluff also opened fire, completely surprising the Union ship. The first Confederate shell scored a direct hit, passing through Cincinnati's magazine and exiting through the bottom of the ship. Another shell disabled the ship's steering mechanism. The Cincinnati's own guns could not be elevated enough to return fire on the high battery. Knowing his ship was doomed, the commander, Lieutenant George M. Bache, headed the Cincinnati full-steam back up the river in search of a place on which to beach the ship. A suitable spot being found, the Cincinnati was run aground, a hawser tied to a tree, and gangplank laid out. Before the men could evacuate, the hawser came loose and the ship slipped from the bank out into the river, where it began to sink in about 18 feet (5.5 m) of water. Many of the crew, including the commander, could not swim; those who could, including Jenkins, began to abandon ship. Still under intense fire, Jenkins and three others, Landsman Thomas E. Corcoran, Boatswain's Mate Henry Dow, and Seaman Martin McHugh, swam back and forth, helping their crewmates to shore. They then reboarded the Cincinnati, hastily repaired a small boat which had been damaged by the Confederate fire, and loaded it with men who were too badly wounded to be dragged through the water. After Lieutenant Bache also climbed into the boat, they towed it to the safety of a Union flotilla. For these actions, Jenkins was awarded the Medal of Honor a month and a half later, on July 10, 1863. The other three swimmers, Corcoran, Dow, and McHugh, and two more Cincinnati crewmen also received the medal for their part in the action. He was medically discharged on Christmas Day, 1863.

On August 21, 2009, the Federal Bureau of Investigation (FBI) donated Jenkins' medal to the Congressional Medal of Honor Museum, located on the museum ship USS Yorktown (CV-10) at Patriot's Point, Mount Pleasant, South Carolina. The FBI came into possession of the medal when it was confiscated during an investigation into stolen and counterfeit Medals of Honor.

== Medal of Honor citation ==
Citation:

Served on board the U.S.S. Cincinnati during the attack on the Vicksburg batteries and at the time of her sinking, 27 May 1863. Engaging the enemy in a fierce battle, the Cincinnati, amidst an incessant fire of shot and shell, continued to fire her guns to the last, though so penetrated by shell fire that her fate was sealed. Serving bravely during this action, Jenkins was conspicuously cool under the fire of the enemy, never ceasing to fight until this proud ship went down, "her colors nailed to the mast."

== See also ==
- List of American Civil War Medal of Honor recipients: G–L
