= Timberclad warship =

19th-century river gunboat

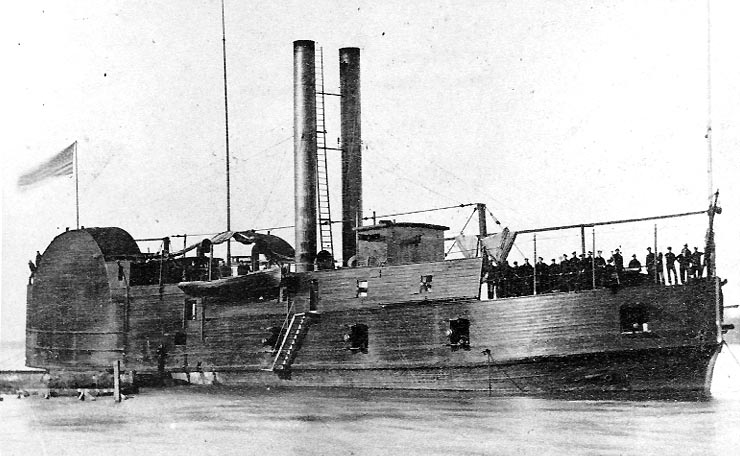
The timberclad USS Conestoga, photographed during the American Civil War

A timberclad warship is a kind of mid 19th century river gunboat.

== Design ==
They were based upon a similar design as ironclad warships but had timber in place of iron to act as ablative armour.

== See also ==
- Cottonclad warship
- Battle of Fort Henry
- USS Conestoga (1861)
- USS Essex (1856)
- USS Lexington (1861)
- USS Tyler (1857)
