= Thomas W. Hamilton =

Thomas W. Hamilton may refer to:

- Thomas Watt Hamilton, perpetrator of the Dunblane massacre
- Thomas W. Hamilton (Medal of Honor), recipient of an American Civil War Medal of Honor
- Thomas William Hamilton (born 1939), author and Apollo program participant, after whom asteroid 4897 Tomhamilton was named
