= George M. Bache =

American naval officer

George Mifflin Bache
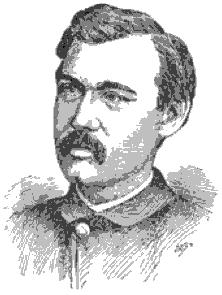
- Born: November 12, 1841; Washington, D.C., US
- Died: February 11, 1896 (aged 55); Washington, D.C., US
- Burial place: Oak Hill Cemetery
- Military career
- Allegiance: United States
- Branch: United States Navy
- Service years: 1855–1875
- Rank: Commander
- Commands: USS Cincinnati; USS Lexington
- Conflicts: American Civil War

George Mifflin Bache, Jr. (/ˈbiːtʃ/ BEECH; November 12, 1841 – February 11, 1896) was an officer in the United States Navy, fighting on the Union side in the American Civil War and continuing to serve for a decade after the war's end. The Fletcher-class destroyer USS Bache (DD-470) was named for him.

== Early life and ancestors ==
He was born in Washington, D.C., to Lt. George Mifflin Bache, USN, who was lost at sea in 1846, and Elizabeth Catherine Patterson. There is a monument in the Congressional Cemetery on Washington to the elder Lt. Bache and the 22 men under his command who were lost in that incident.

He was the grandson of Richard Bache, Jr., who served in the Republic of Texas navy and was an elected representative in the Texas legislature, and Sophia Burrell Dallas, daughter of Arabella Maria Smith and Alexander James Dallas, who served as the U.S. Treasury Secretary under President James Madison.

He was also a great-grandson of Sarah Franklin Bache and Richard Bache, and a great-great-grandson of Benjamin Franklin, as well as a nephew of George Mifflin Dallas, the 11th Vice President of the United States, serving under James K. Polk.

His uncles included Alexander Dallas Bache, Superintendent of the United States Coast Survey, and Admiral David Dixon Porter.

== Education and career ==
His father was killed in 1846, swept overboard during a gale while in command of the brig Washington, but despite this Bache joined the United States Navy in August 1855, serving as captain's clerk aboard the sloop-of-war Saratoga until May 1857. He then briefly served aboard the U.S. Coast Survey schooner Nautilus as acting-master's mate under the command of Lieutenant Richard Wainwright, another uncle by marriage, before entering the United States Naval Academy on November 19, 1857, with the rank of acting-midshipman. He graduated on June 1, 1861, just after the outbreak of the Civil War, with the rank of midshipman.

== Civil War and later life ==
During the war, he first served aboard Jamestown. Promoted to lieutenant on July 16, 1862, he served briefly in the steam sloop Powhatan before transferring to the squadron on the Mississippi River late in 1862. On November 8, 1862, he received orders to assume command of the stern-wheel casemate gunboat Cincinnati. Bache commanded the gunboat during operations leading up to the fall of Vicksburg, Mississippi, early in July 1863. During those operations, however, his ship was sunk on May 27, 1863, while dueling Confederate batteries defending the river approaches to the city.

That summer, he took command of the sidewheel gunboat Lexington and led her in a number of engagements with Confederate forces. In 1864, he returned to the Atlantic blockade as executive officer of Powhatan. While assigned to that ship, Bache participated in both the unsuccessful and successful assaults on Fort Fisher, carried out in December 1864 and January 1865. In the latter attack, he was wounded but not severely.

Promoted to lieutenant-commander on July 25, 1866, he served in Sacramento until she was destroyed on a reef at the mouth of the Godavari River, Madras, India, on June 19, 1867. Between 1869 and 1872, Bache was assigned to the steam sloop Juniata on the European Station. After that, he went ashore to ordnance duty at the Washington Navy Yard until his retirement on April 5, 1875, receiving promotion to commander the same day.

Bache died on February 11, 1896, at Washington, D.C. He was buried in Oak Hill Cemetery.

The destroyer Bache (DD-470) (1942–1968) was named in his honor.
