= CSS Jackson =

Confederate gunboat of American Civil War

History

Confederate States of America
- Name: Jackson
- Launched: 1849
- Acquired: by purchase, 9 May 1861
- Commissioned: June 1861
- Fate: Destroyed to prevent capture, April 1862

General characteristics
- Type: Gunboat
- Tonnage: 297 long tons (302 t)
- Propulsion: Steam engine, stern-wheel
- Complement: 75
- Armament: 2 × 32-pounder guns

CSS Jackson was a gunboat of the Confederate Navy during the American Civil War.

Built at Cincinnati, Ohio, in 1849 as Yankee, the fast side-wheel river tug was purchased at New Orleans on 9 May 1861 by Capt. Lawrence Rousseau, CSN, then strengthened and fitted for service in the Confederate Navy, and renamed Jackson.

== Service history ==
On 6 June Lt. W. Gwathmey, CSN, was ordered to her command, and after shipping a crew, took her up the Mississippi River to Columbus, Kentucky, to join the squadron under Capt. George N. Hollins charged with the defense of the river.

On 4 September 1861 Jackson supported by shore batteries briefly and inconclusively engaged the gunboats USS Lexington and Tyler off Hickman, Kentucky. The Federal ships finding the current fast setting them down upon the Confederate batteries returned to their former position. Six days later the little gunboat took part in a spirited engagement at Lucas Bend, Missouri, between Confederate artillery and cavalry and Union gunboats Lexington and Conestoga during which she received an 8-inch shell in her wheel house and side which forced her to retire on one engine.

Jackson sailed with Hollins' squadron to attack five of the Federal blockaders at the Head of Passes, Mississippi River, on 12 October 1861. They successfully routed the Union forces and proceeded to the defense of Forts Jackson and St. Philip which the United States Mortar Flotilla under Commodore David Dixon Porter bombarded from 18 to 24 April 1862. On 23 April Jackson was despatched to make the canals above the fort inaccessible to Union ships.

When the commanding officer, Lt. F. B. Renshaw, CSN, found it impossible to stem the Federal advance he retired to New Orleans. After the surrender of that city, Jackson was destroyed by the Confederates.

== See also ==
- List of ships of the Confederate States Navy
- Bibliography of American Civil War naval history
- Union Navy
- Confederate States Navy
