= USS Cincinnati (1861) =

Gunboat of the United States Navy

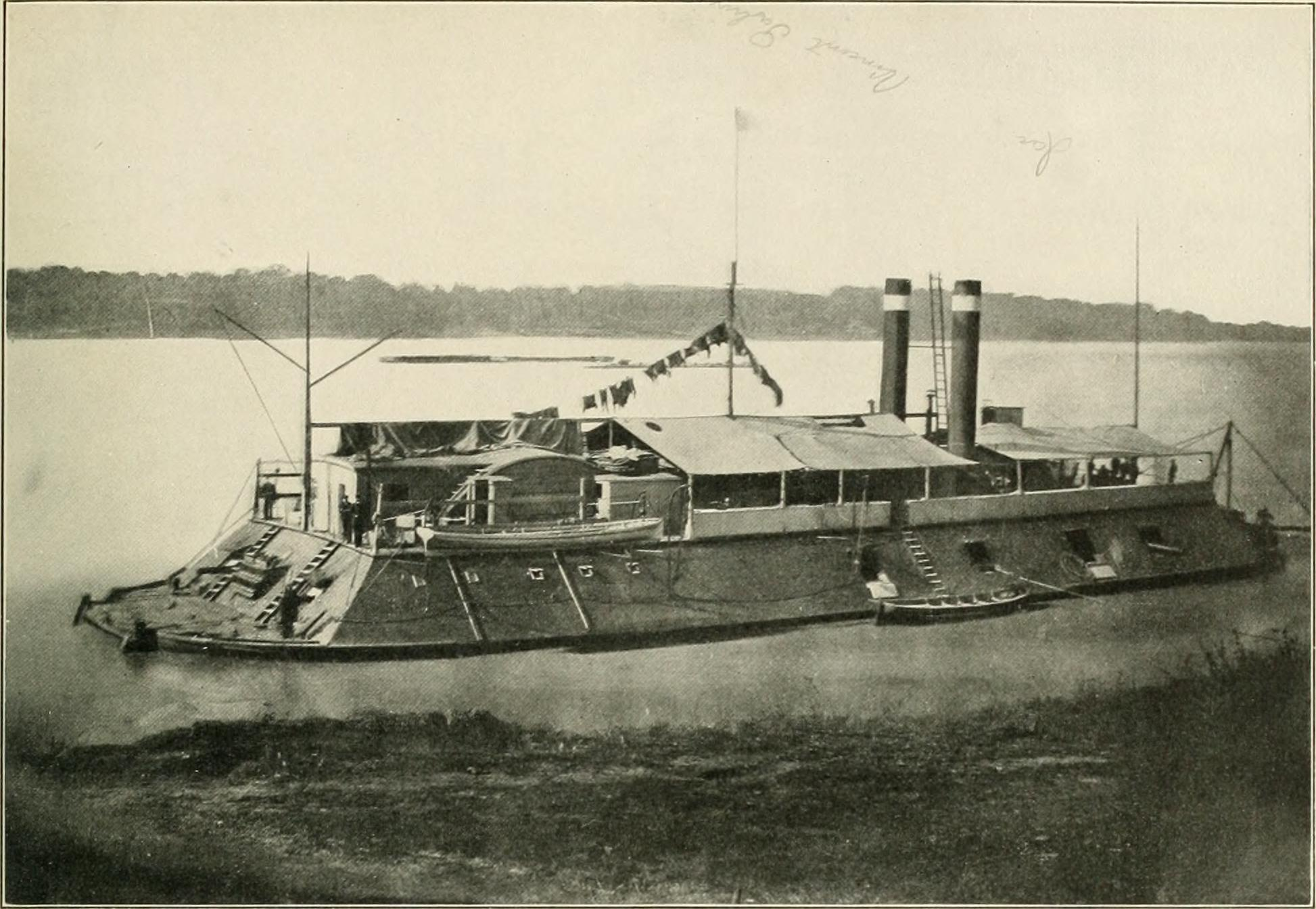
- USS Cincinnati on the Western Rivers in 1862–63

History

United States
- Namesake: Cincinnati, Ohio
- Builder: James Eads
- Launched: 1861
- Commissioned: January 16, 1862
- Decommissioned: August 4, 1865
- Fate: Sold, March 28, 1866

General characteristics
- Class & type: City-class ironclad
- Displacement: 512 tons
- Length: 175 ft (53 m)
- Beam: 51 ft 2 in (15.60 m)
- Draft: 6 ft (1.8 m)
- Speed: 4 knots (7.4 km/h; 4.6 mph)
- Armament: 6 × 32 pdr (15 kg); 3 × 8 in (200 mm) sb.; 4 × 42 pdr (19 kg) r.; 1 × 12 pdr (5.4 kg) how.

The City-class ironclad USS Cincinnati was a stern-wheel casemate gunboat in the United States Navy during the American Civil War. She was named for Cincinnati, Ohio, and was the first ship to bear that name in the United States Navy.

== Service history ==
Cincinnati was built in 1861 under a War Department contract by James Eads, St. Louis, Missouri, and commissioned at Mound City, Illinois, January 16, 1862, Lieutenant George M. Bache in command.

Assigned to duty with the Army in the Western Gunboat Flotilla under U.S. Navy Flag Officer Andrew H. Foote, Cincinnati participated in the attack and capture of Fort Henry (February 6, 1862); the operations against Island No. 10 (March 12 – April 7, 1862); the engagement with the Confederate gunboat fleet at Plum Point Bend and the bombardment of Fort Pillow (May 10, 1862). This important series of operations was aimed at splitting the Confederacy. During the last engagement Cincinnati, the lead vessel, was repeatedly struck by enemy rams and sunk.

Raised and returned to service, Cincinnati was transferred to the Navy Department 1 October 1862 with other vessels of the Western Gunboat Flotilla. She participated in the Army-Navy operation against Arkansas Post or Fort Hindman, a Confederate fort on the Arkansas River, and installations on the White River in January 1863, then was ordered to the Yazoo River where she took part in Steele's Bayou Expedition (March 14–27, 1863).

On May 27, 1863, during the Siege of Vicksburg, Mississippi, Cincinnati was ordered to steam down the Mississippi River and destroy two Confederate artillery guns which were impeding the advance of General William Tecumseh Sherman's right flank. Between Cincinnati and the two guns was a Confederate eleven-piece heavy artillery battery which, from its position atop a bluff, had command over that entire stretch of the river. This "Upper River Battery" was composed of the remnants of Hoagley's Battery, CS and referred to simply as the "Arkansas Battery." The Union forces had been aware of the battery, but, shortly before Cincinnati received its orders, the battery had disappeared and was assumed to have been moved elsewhere. Unbeknownst to them, the battery's guns had been removed from view by simply lowering them from their carriages, both to protect them from the fire of ships on the river and to deceive the Union forces. The commander of the battery, Capt. William Pratt Parks, (CS Army) had discovered the Union signal code, and when he intercepted a message describing Cincinnati's mission, he had the guns re-assembled during the night and concealed them in brush.

On the morning of May 27, Cincinnati headed downstream and reached its target, the two artillery guns. Just as it fired its first shots, the hidden battery on the bluff also opened fire, completely surprising the Union ship. The first Confederate shell scored a direct hit, passing through Cincinnati's magazine and exiting through the bottom of the ship. Another shell disabled the ship's steering mechanism. Cincinnati's own guns could not be elevated enough to return fire on the high battery. Knowing his ship was doomed, the commander, Lieutenant George M. Bache, headed Cincinnati full-steam back up the river in search of a place on which to beach the ship. A suitable spot being found, Cincinnati was run aground, a hawser tied to a tree, and gangplank laid out. Before the men could evacuate, the hawser came loose and the ship slipped from the bank out into the river, where it began to sink in about 18 feet (5.5 m) of water. Many of the crew, including the commander, could not swim; those who could began to abandon ship. Still under intense fire four sailors, Landsman Thomas E. Corcoran, Boatswain's Mate Henry Dow, Seaman Thomas Jenkins, and Seaman Martin McHugh, swam back and forth, helping their crewmates to shore. They then reboarded Cincinnati, hastily repaired a small boat which had been damaged by the Confederate fire, and loaded it with men who were too badly wounded to be dragged through the water. After Lieutenant Bache also climbed into the boat, they towed it to the safety of a Union flotilla. Six crewman from Cincinnati were awarded the Medal of Honor for their actions during the sinking: Quartermaster Frank Bois, Landsman Thomas E. Corcoran, Boatswain's Mate Henry Dow, Quartermaster Thomas W. Hamilton, Seaman Thomas Jenkins, and Seaman Martin McHugh.

Raised again in August 1863, Cincinnati returned to patrol duty on the Mississippi River and its tributaries until February 1865 when she was transferred to the West Gulf Blockading Squadron. She patrolled off Mobile Bay and in the Mississippi Sounds until placed out of commission August 4, 1865 at Algiers, Louisiana. She was sold at New Orleans on March 28, 1866.

== See also ==
- Union Navy
- Anaconda Plan
- Mississippi Squadron
