= USS Bache (DD-470) =

Fletcher-class destroyer

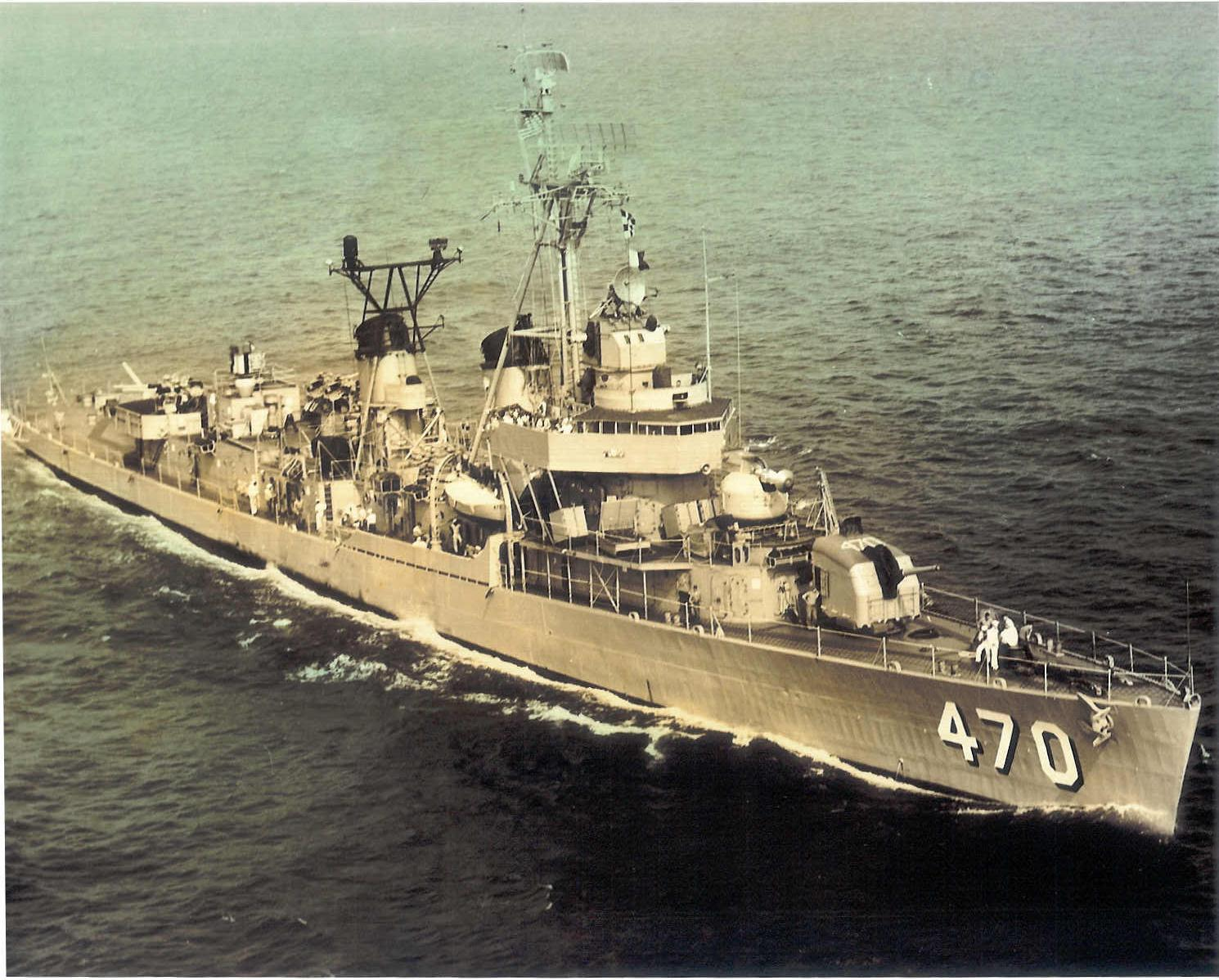
- USS Bache at sea

History

United States
- Name: Bache
- Namesake: George M. Bache
- Builder: Bethlehem Shipbuilding Corporation, Staten Island
- Laid down: 19 November 1941
- Launched: 7 July 1942
- Commissioned: 14 November 1942
- Decommissioned: 1 March 1968
- Stricken: 1 March 1968
- Identification: DD-470/DDE-470
- Fate: Wrecked off Rhodes, 6 February 1968

General characteristics
- Class & type: Fletcher-class destroyer
- Displacement: 2,050 tons
- Length: 376 ft 6 in (114.8 m)
- Beam: 39 ft 8 in (12.1 m)
- Draft: 17 ft 9 in (5.4 m)
- Propulsion: 60,000 shp (44,742 kW); 2 propellers
- Speed: 35 knots (65 km/h; 40 mph)
- Range: 6,500 nmi (12,000 km) at 15 kn (28 km/h)
- Complement: 329
- Armament: 5 × single Mk 12 5 in (127 mm)/38 guns; 5 × twin 40 mm (1.6 in) Bofors AA guns; 7 × single 20 mm (0.8 in) Oerlikon AA guns; 2 × quintuple 21 in (533 mm) torpedo tubes; 6 × single depth charge throwers; 2 × depth charge racks

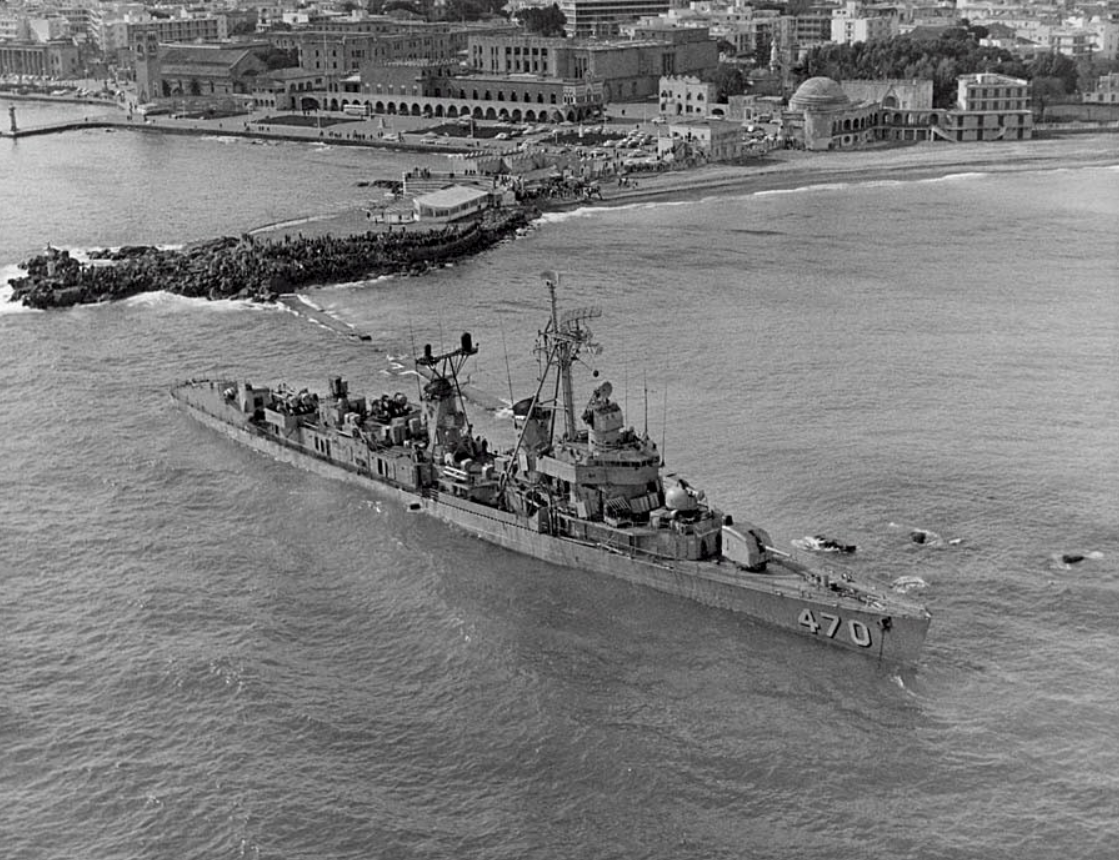
USS Bache at Rhodes after she was blown aground in a gale on 6 February 1968.

USS Bache (DD/DDE-470), a Fletcher-class destroyer, was the second ship of the United States Navy of that name. The destroyer was named for Commander George M. Bache.

Bache was launched on 7 July 1942 by Bethlehem Steel Co. at Staten Island, New York and sponsored by Miss Louise Bache, daughter of Commander Bache. The destroyer was commissioned on 14 November 1942.

== Service history ==
Reporting to the Atlantic Fleet, she acted as escort to a westbound convoy to Halifax, Nova Scotia, and then returned to Brooklyn Navy Yard in New York City for her postshakedown overhaul. On 6 February 1943, she left Norfolk as escort for HMS Victorious. The vessels arrived at Pearl Harbor on 4 March 1943. On 10 May, after a training period, Bache departed for the Aleutian Islands. She served in the Aleutian area until December 1943, taking part in the bombardment of Kiska. After a brief overhaul at Pearl Harbor, she joined the 7th Fleet 23 December 1943.

Until 29 October 1944, Bache operated with the 7th Fleet, taking part in the bombardment of New Britain Islands (26 December 1943), Los Negros Island, Admiralty Islands, and landings (29 February 1944); bombardment of Ndrillo and Karunia Islands in the Admiralties (4–7 March), bombardment of various assault beaches and targets of opportunity on New Guinea and adjacent islands (10 April – 15 September); bombardment of Leyte Island, the Philippines (20 October); and finally, 25 October 1944, as a unit of Task Group 77.3, she took part in the overwhelming victory of Battle of Surigao Strait. On 29 October, Bache departed Leyte en route to the United States for yard overhaul.

=== Marshall Islands, Okinawa ===
Upon completion of her overhaul, she joined the 5th Fleet at Eniwetok on 20 February 1945. Between 28 February and 5 March, she provided air support at Iwo Jima. On 1 April, Bache arrived off Okinawa for screening and picket duty. She suffered slight damage on 3 May, when an enemy kamikaze aircraft overshot the ship and crashed into the sea. That same day, she went to the aid of the stricken LSM(R)-195 and rescued her crew of 74. Remaining on this duty, she helped destroy several enemy planes. On 13 May, several enemy dive bombers attacked the picket station, and one completed a successful kamikaze attack on Bache. The wing of the plane struck near number-two stack, catapulting the plane down on the main deck amidships, with its bomb exploding about seven feet (2.1 m) above the main deck. Forty-one of the crew were killed (16 missing in action) and 32 were injured. All steam and electrical powers were lost. Fires were brought under control within 20 minutes and she was towed to Kerama Retto, Okinawa, for temporary repairs.

Bache arrived at New York Navy Yard on 13 July 1945 for permanent repairs and then went to Charleston, South Carolina, for inactivation. On 4 February 1946, Bache went out of commission in reserve at Charleston.

In 1950, Bache was converted to an escort destroyer at Boston Navy Yard (reclassified DDE-470 on 2 January 1951) and recommissioned on 1 October 1951. Bache was assigned to the Atlantic Fleet, and then made six cruises to the Caribbean Sea for operations and training exercises and three cruises in the Mediterranean Sea, where she operated as a unit of the 6th Fleet.

Bache reverted to DD-470 on 30 June 1962. At some point, Bache was equipped with a Weapon Alpha antisubmarine rocket launcher, in place of gun turret number 2, as a means of modernizing her capabilities. Bache was blown aground outside of the Rhodes Harbor by a gale during a three-day port visit to the Island of Rhodes, Greece, on 6 February 1968. She was declared a constructive total loss and scrapped there. Bache was decommissioned and stricken from the Naval Vessel Register on 1 March 1968.

== Honors ==
Bache received eight battle stars for her World War II service.
