= USS Nautilus (1838) =

History

United States
- Name: Nautilus
- Operator: United States Coast Survey
- Launched: 1838
- Completed: 1838
- Fate: Transferred to United States Navy 1847
- Acquired: July 1848 (returned by U.S. Navy)
- Decommissioned: 1859

United States
- Name: USS Nautilus
- Namesake: Previous name retained
- Acquired: 1847
- Commissioned: 1847
- Decommissioned: July 1848
- Fate: Returned to U.S. Coast Survey July 1848

General characteristics (as U.S. Navy vessel)
- Type: Schooner
- Length: 76 ft (23.2 m)
- Beam: 19 ft (5.8 m)

The second USS Nautilus was a 76-foot (23.2 m) schooner launched in 1838 for the United States Coast Survey for hydrographic surveying of the coast of the United States. She was commissioned into the United States Navy in 1847 for service in the Mexican–American War, then returned to Coast Survey service from 1848 to 1859.

== Service history ==
=== U.S. Coast Survey, 1838–1847 ===
Nautilus, the first ship designed for the United States Coast Survey, was completed in 1838. Until the spring of 1844 she carried out surveys for the Coast Survey in the Gulf of Mexico and along the United States East Coast, operating under Mr. Ferdinand R. Hassler from 1838 to 1843 and Dr. A. D. Bache from 1843 to 1844. In April 1844, although still a Coast Survey ship, she was put under the command of Lieutenant G. M. Bache, USN, to undertake surveys for the U.S. Navy.

=== Mexican–American War, 1847–1848 ===
Three years later, in 1847, Nautilus was taken over by the U.S. Navy for temporary duty during the Mexican–American War, as light-draft vessels were needed for operations off the United States Gulf Coast. Such vessels, with their ability to ride over the sandbars frequently found at the entrances to harbors on that coast and to patrol between those harbors close to shore, facilitated combined operations and the U.S. Navy's ability to provide U.S. forces in Mexico under Major General Zachary Taylor with a secure line of communications in the Gulf of Mexico. The Navy returned Nautilus to the Coast Survey in July 1848.

=== U.S. Coast Survey, 1848–1859 ===
After Nautilus′s return to the Coast Survey, she performed hydrographic survey duties for that agency until 1859.
