= Battle of Fort Henry =

1862 battle of the American Civil War in Tennessee

Coordinates: 36.5186°N 88.0391°W

- Part of the American Civil War
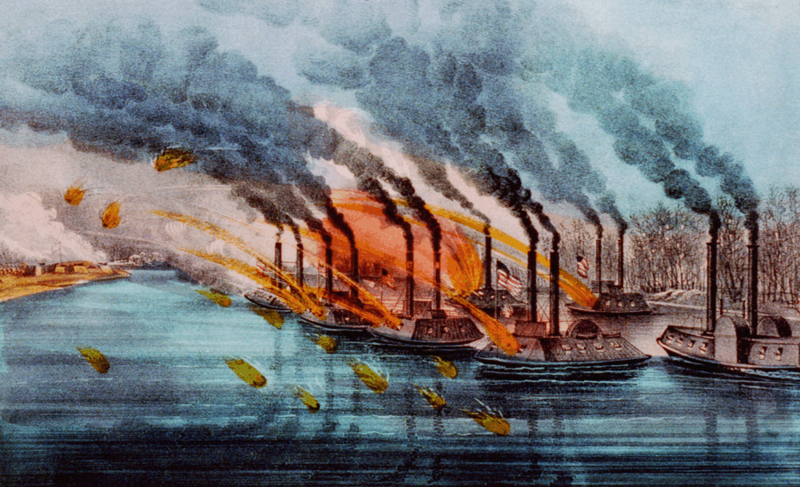
- Bombardment and capture of Fort Henry, Tenn, 1860s lithograph by Currier and Ives
Date	February 6, 1862
Location	Stewart County and Henry County, Tennessee, and Calloway County, Kentucky
Result	Union victory

Belligerents
United States (Union)	(Confederate States of America) CSA (Confederacy)

Commanders and leaders
(United States) Ulysses S. Grant (United States Navy) Andrew H. Foote	Lloyd Tilghman (POW)

Units involved
(United States) Army of the Tennessee (District of Cairo); (United States Navy) Western Flotilla	Army of Central Kentucky; Fort Henry garrison; Fort Heiman garrison

Strength
15,000; 7 ships	3,000–3,400 17 heavy guns

Casualties and losses
40; 1 Ironclad Seriously Damaged; 1 Ironclad moderately damaged 48 killed & wounded, including 19 army soldiers, aboard the ironclad Essex	79; 90 surrendered, including Tilghman and his staff Rest of garrison to Fort Donelson

The Battle of Fort Henry was fought on February 6, 1862, in Stewart County, Tennessee, during the American Civil War. It was the first important victory for the Union and Brig. Gen. Ulysses S. Grant in the Western Theater.

On February 4 and 5, Grant landed two divisions just north of Fort Henry on the Tennessee River. (The troops serving under Grant were the nucleus of the Union's successful Army of the Tennessee, although that name was not yet in use.) Grant's plan was to advance upon the fort on February 6 while it was being simultaneously attacked by Union gunboats commanded by Flag Officer Andrew Hull Foote. A combination of accurate and effective naval gunfire, heavy rain, and the poor siting of the fort, nearly inundated by rising river waters, caused its commander, Brig. Gen. Lloyd Tilghman, to surrender to Foote before the Union Army arrived.

The surrender of Fort Henry opened the Tennessee River to Union traffic upriver through and along West Tennessee to a point south of the Alabama border. In the days following the fort's surrender, from February 6 through February 12, Union raids used ironclad boats to destroy Confederate shipping and railroad bridges along the river. On February 12, Grant's army proceeded overland 12 miles (19 km) to engage with Confederate troops in the Battle of Fort Donelson.

== Background ==
In early 1861, the critical border state of Kentucky had declared neutrality in the American Civil War. This neutrality was first violated on September 3, when Confederate Brig. Gen. Gideon J. Pillow, acting on orders from Maj. Gen. Leonidas Polk, occupied Columbus, Kentucky, which overlooked strong defensive bluffs, to defend the Mississippi from Federal offensive action and was the terminus of the Memphis & Ohio railroad, which in turn leads southwards to the extremely important Charleston & Memphis railroad. The riverside town was situated on 180 feet (55 m) high bluffs that commanded the river at that point, where the Confederates installed 140 large guns, underwater mines and a heavy chain that stretched a mile across the Mississippi River to Belmont, while occupying the town with 12,000 Confederate troops, thus cutting off northern commerce to the south and beyond.

Two days later, Union Brig. Gen. Ulysses S. Grant, displaying the personal initiative that would characterize his later career, seized Paducah, Kentucky, a major transportation hub of rail and port facilities at the mouth of the Tennessee River. Henceforth, neither adversary respected Kentucky's proclaimed neutrality, and the Confederate advantage was lost. The buffer zone that Kentucky provided between the North and the South was no longer available to assist in the defense of Tennessee.

By early 1862, a single general, Albert Sidney Johnston, commanded all the Confederate forces from Arkansas to the Cumberland Gap, but his forces were spread too thinly over a wide defensive line. Johnston's left flank was Polk, in Columbus with 12,000 men; his right flank was Brig. Gen. Simon Bolivar Buckner, in Bowling Green, Kentucky, with 4,000 men; the center consisted of two forts, Forts Henry and Donelson, under the command of Brig. Gen. Lloyd Tilghman, also with 4,000 men. Forts Henry and Donelson were the sole positions defending the important Tennessee and Cumberland Rivers, respectively. If these rivers were opened to Union military traffic, two direct invasion paths would lead into western & eastern Tennessee, and the vital Memphis & SC Railroad and more.

Key commanders at the Battle of Fort Henry
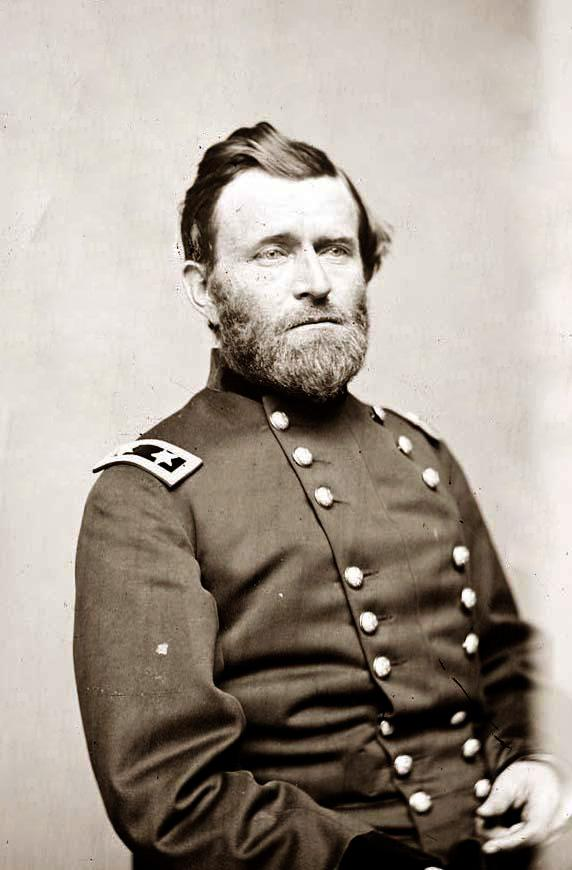
Brig. Gen.
Ulysses S. Grant, USA

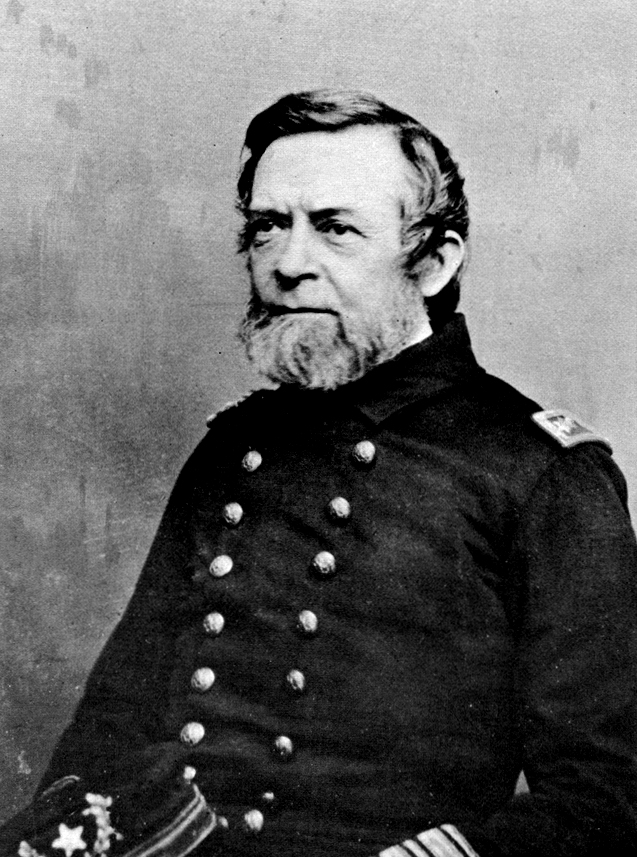
Flag Officer
Andrew H. Foote, USN

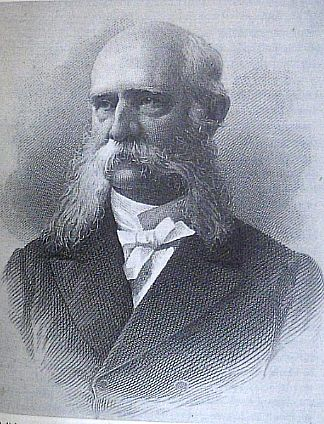
Commander Seth Ledyard Phelps, USN

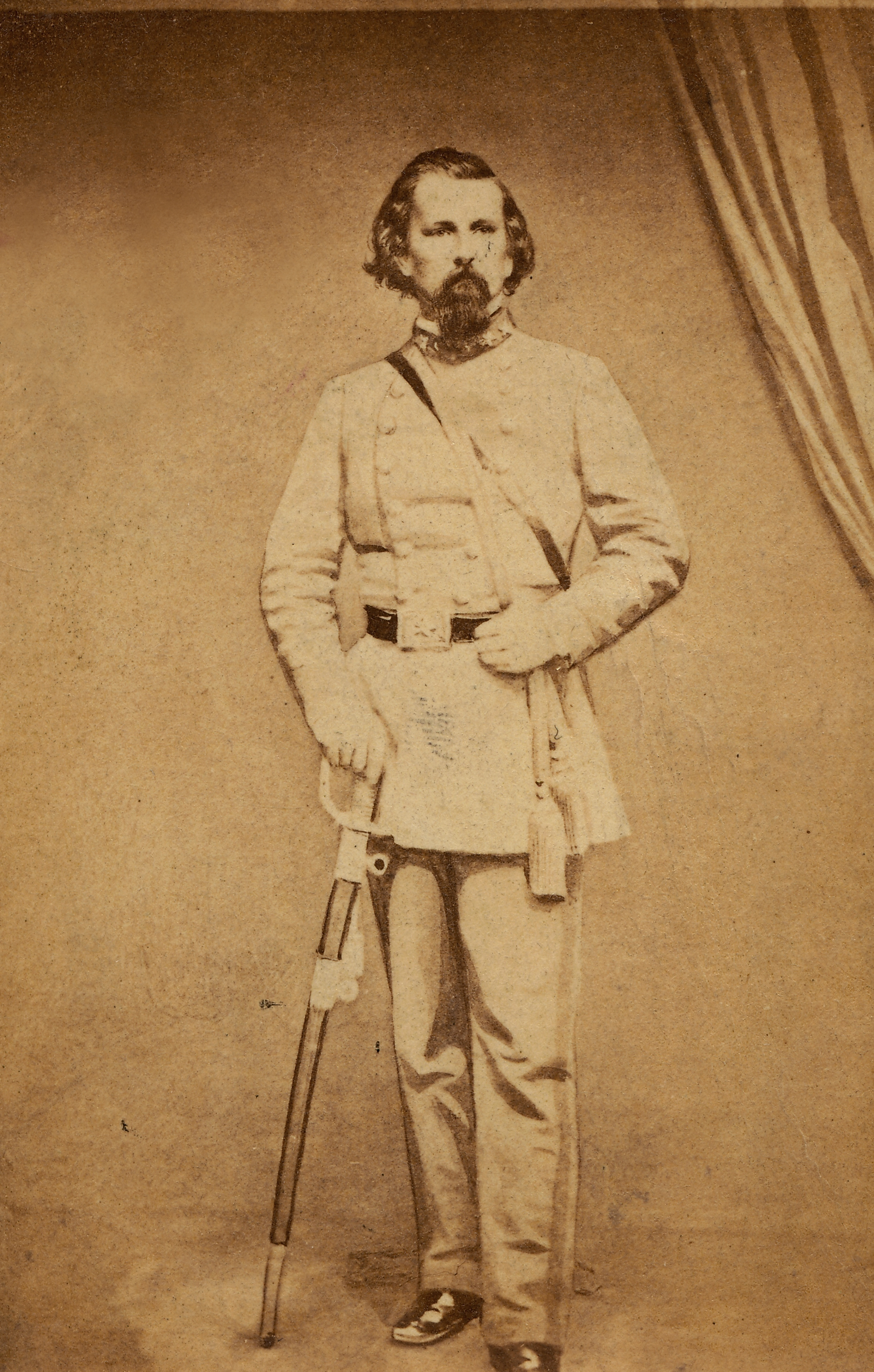
Brig. Gen.
Lloyd Tilghman, CSA

The Union military command in the West suffered from a lack of unified command, and were organized into three separate departments: the Department of Kansas, under Maj. Gen. David Hunter; the Department of Missouri, under Maj. Gen. Henry W. Halleck; and the Department of the Ohio, under Brig. Gen. Don Carlos Buell. By January 1862, the disunity was apparent because they could not agree on a strategy for operations in the Western Theater. Buell, under political pressure to invade and hold pro-Union eastern Tennessee, moved slowly in the direction of Nashville. In Halleck's department, Grant moved up the Tennessee River to divert attention from Buell's intended advance, which did not occur. Halleck and the other generals in the West were coming under political pressure from President Abraham Lincoln to participate in a general offensive by Washington's birthday (February 22). Despite his tradition of caution, Halleck eventually reacted positively to Grant's proposal to move against Fort Henry. Halleck hoped that this would improve his standing in relation to his rival, Buell. Halleck and Grant were also concerned about rumors that Confederate General P.G.T. Beauregard would soon arrive with 15 Confederate regiments. On January 30, 1862, Halleck authorized Grant to take Fort Henry.

Grant wasted no time, leaving Cairo, Illinois, at the confluence of the Mississippi and Ohio Rivers, on February 2. His invasion force, which arrived on the Tennessee River on February 4 and 5, consisted of 15,000–17,000 men in two divisions, commanded by Brig. Gens. John A. McClernand and Charles F. Smith, supported by the Western Gunboat Flotilla, commanded by United States Navy Flag Officer Andrew Hull Foote. The flotilla included four ironclad gunboats (flagship USS Cincinnati, USS Carondelet, USS St. Louis, and USS Essex) under Foote's direct command, and three timberclad gunboats (USS Conestoga, USS Tyler, and USS Lexington) under Lt. Seth Ledyard Phelps. Insufficient transport ships this early in the war to deliver all of the army troops in a single operation required two trips upriver to reach the fort. General Johnston was pressured by the confederate government to defend the Mississippi, Cumberland, and Tennessee rivers, and the important railroads in the region, to which end he concentrated his forces at Columbus, Forts Henry and Donelson, Russellville, Bowling Green, and the Cumberland Gap in eastern Kentucky. When Beauregard arrived at Bowling Green, he expected "to find 40,000 Confederate soldiers at Bowling Green and another 30,000 at Columbus, ready to assume the offensive. Instead, he was shocked to see an army of some 14,000 effectives at Bowling Green, with deficient arms, equipment, and transportation... Beauregard, 'realizing how useless his presence would be to General Johnston, under the existing circumstances, informed the latter that, in his opinion, he had best return at once to Virginia." Johnston convinced Beauregard to remain, but the latter was too ill to assume command of Forts Henry and Donelson. This was unfortunate as Johnston desperately needed an officer with Beauregard's engineering skill to defend the Tennessee and Cumberland rivers. Fort Henry was considered a liability due to its poor position and engineering which made it highly susceptible to being flooded during high tide and rain, and was garrisoned by a token force of 3,000-4,000 including the crews for the heavy guns. Johnston ordered Tilghman to place naval mines in the Tennessee River to help defend Fort Henry, and to construct Fort Heiman on the hills opposite the fort on the Kentucky side of the Tennessee River to prevent its bombardment by Federal artillery.

== Fort Henry ==
Fort Henry was a five-sided, open-bastioned earthen structure covering 10 acres (0.04 km^{2}) on the eastern bank of the Tennessee River, near Kirkman's Old Landing. The site was about one mile above Panther Creek and about six miles below the mouth of the Big Sandy River and Standing Rock Creek.

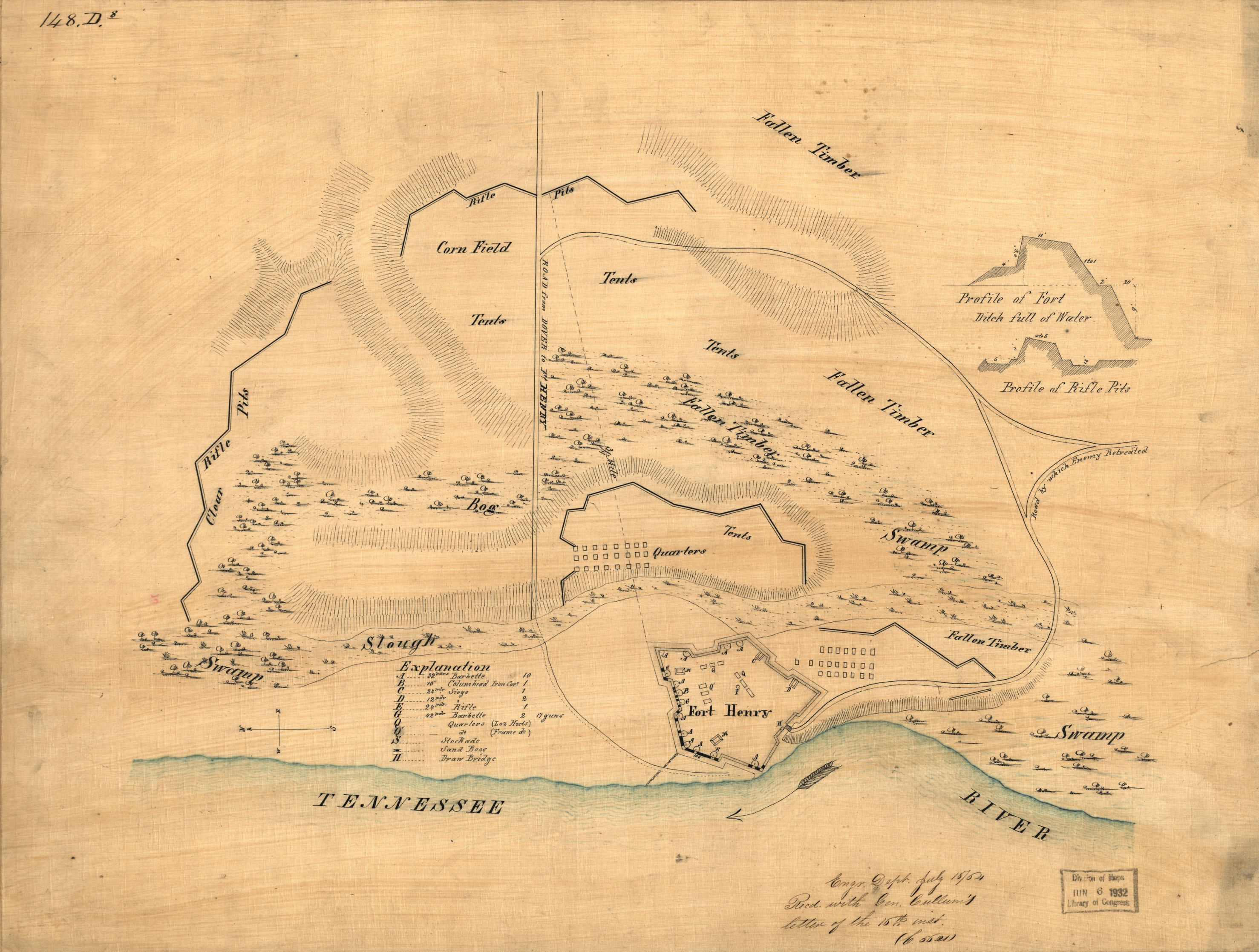
Relief map of Fort Henry, drafted by General Cullum w/ his notations

In May 1861, Isham G. Harris, the governor of Tennessee, appointed the state's attorney, Daniel S. Donelson, as a brigadier general and directed him to build fortifications on the rivers of Middle Tennessee. Donelson found suitable sites, but they were within the borders of Kentucky, still a neutral state at that time. Moving upriver, just inside the Tennessee border, Donelson selected the site of the fort on the Cumberland River that would bear his name. Colonel Bushrod Johnson of the Tennessee Corps of Engineers approved of the site.

As construction of Fort Donelson began, Donelson moved 12 miles (19 km) west, to the Tennessee River, and selected the site of Fort Henry, naming it after Tennessee Senator Gustavus Adolphus Henry Sr. With Fort Donelson on the west bank of the Cumberland, Donelson selected the east bank of the Tennessee for the second fort so one garrison could travel between them and defend both positions. (Donelson thought it unlikely that the two forts would be attacked simultaneously.) Unlike its counterpart on the Cumberland, Fort Henry was situated on low, swampy ground and dominated by hills across the river. This oversight developed into frequent flooding of the fort during rains or high tide, on some occasions more than half of the fort was underwater after rain, including most of its armory. To its advantage, it had an unobstructed field of fire 2 miles (3.2 km) downriver. Donelson's surveying team—Adna Anderson, a civil engineer, and Maj. William F. Foster from the 1st Tennessee Infantry—objected strongly to the site and appealed to Colonel Johnson, who inexplicably approved it.

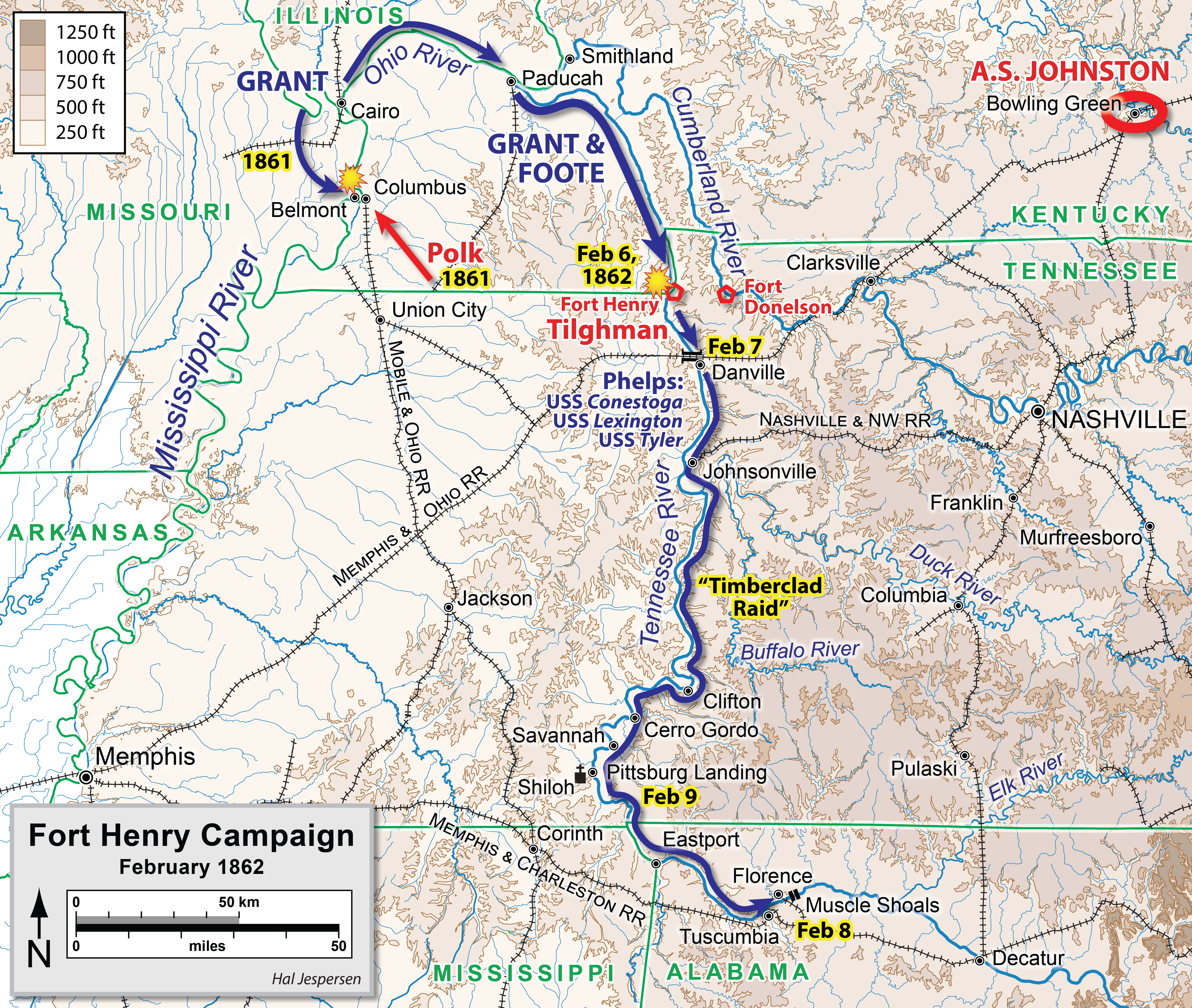
Campaign for Fort Henry

The fort was designed to stop traffic on the river, not to withstand large-scale infantry assaults that armies would use during the war. Construction began in mid-June, using men from the 10th Tennessee Infantry and slaves. The first cannon was test fired on July 12, 1861. After this flurry of activity, the remainder of 1861 saw little action because forts on the Mississippi River had a higher priority for receiving men and artillery. General Polk also neglected Forts Henry and Donelson in favor of defending Columbus, Kentucky. In late December, additional men from the 27th Alabama Infantry arrived along with 500 slaves to construct a small fortification across the river on Stewart's Hill, within artillery range of Fort Henry, and named it Fort Heiman. In January 1862, Brig. Gen. Lloyd Tilghman assumed command of both Forts Henry and Donelson, with a combined force of 4,900 men. At Fort Henry, approximately 3,000–3,400 men in two brigades were commanded by Colonels Adolphus Heiman and Joseph Drake. The men were armed primarily with antique flintlock rifles from the War of 1812.

Seventeen guns were mounted in Fort Henry by the time of the battle, eleven covering the river and the other six positioned to defend against a land attack (18-pounder smoothbores). There were two heavy guns, a 10-inch (250 mm) Columbiad and a 24-pounder rifled cannon, with the remainder being 32-pounder smoothbores. There were also two 42-pounders, but no ammunition of that caliber was available. When the river was at normal levels, the fort's walls rose 20 feet (6.1 m) above it and were 20 feet (6.1 m) thick at the base, sloping upward to a width of nearly 10 feet (3.0 m) at the parapet. However, in February 1862, heavy rains caused the river to rise and most of the fort was underwater, including the powder magazine.

The Confederates deployed one additional defensive measure, which was then unique in the history of warfare: several torpedoes (in modern terminology, a naval minefield) were anchored below the surface in the main shipping channel, rigged to explode when touched by a passing ship. (This measure turned out to be ineffective, due to high water levels and leaks in the torpedoes' metal containers.)

== Battle ==
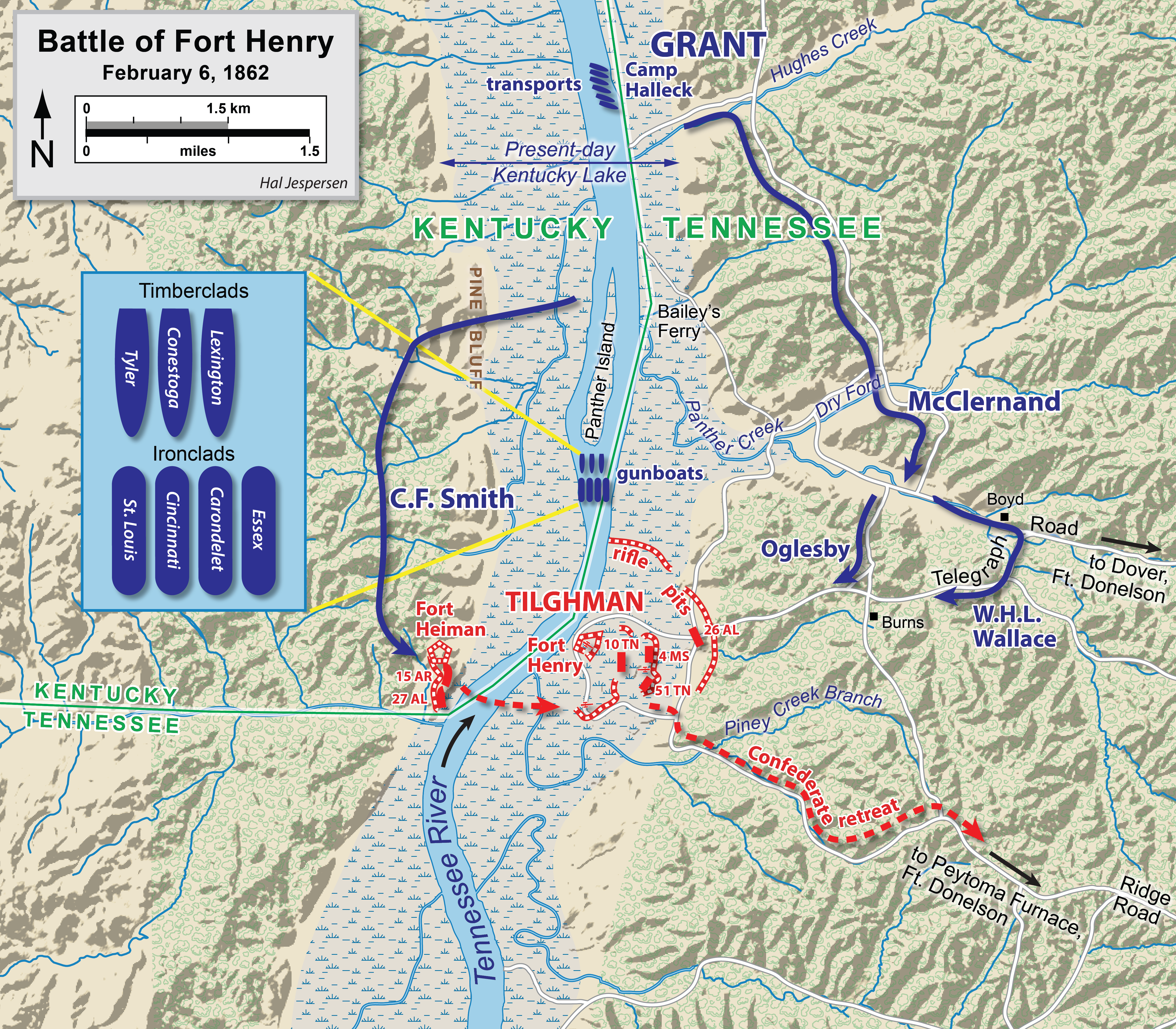
Battle of Fort Henry

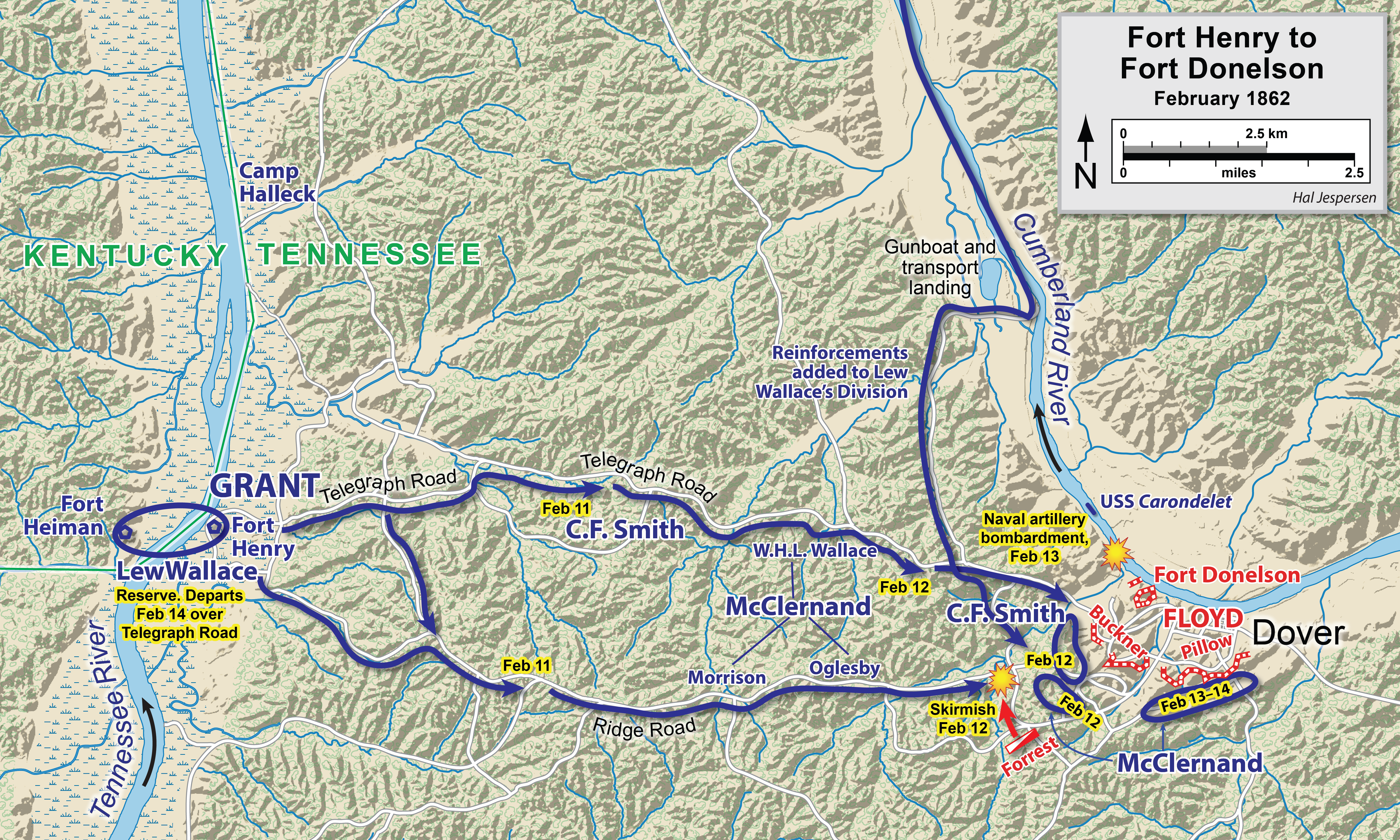
Movements from Fort Henry to Fort Donelson

On February 4 and 5, Grant landed his divisions in two different locations. McClernand's division was 3 miles (4.8 km) north of the fort, on the east bank of the Tennessee River, to prevent the garrison's escape. C.F. Smith's division would seize Fort Heiman on the Kentucky side of the river and turn its artillery on Fort Henry. When heavy rains the night of February 5 slowed the progress of Union troops toward the forts, the battle turned on naval actions, which concluded before the infantry saw action.

Tilghman realized that it was only a matter of time before Fort Henry fell. Only nine guns remained above the water to mount a defense. While leaving artillery in the fort to hold off the Union gunboats, he ordered the majority of his force to march, under the command of Col. Adolphus Heiman, on the overland route to Fort Donelson, 12 miles (19 km) away. Fort Heiman was abandoned on February 4; gunfire from the gunboats on Fort Henry garrison caused 4 Confederate casualties [1 killed 3 wounded] on the afternoon of February 5. All but a part of Company B,1st Tennessee Artillery CSA [54 men] left Fort Henry on February 5. (Union cavalry pursued the retreating Confederates, but poor road conditions prevented any serious confrontation and they took few captives.) Tilghman, as was his custom, spent the night of February 5–6 on the steamer Dunbar, 1.5 miles (2.4 km) upstream from the fort. Around midnight he sent an update on the situation to Johnston, then returned to Fort Henry just before dawn.

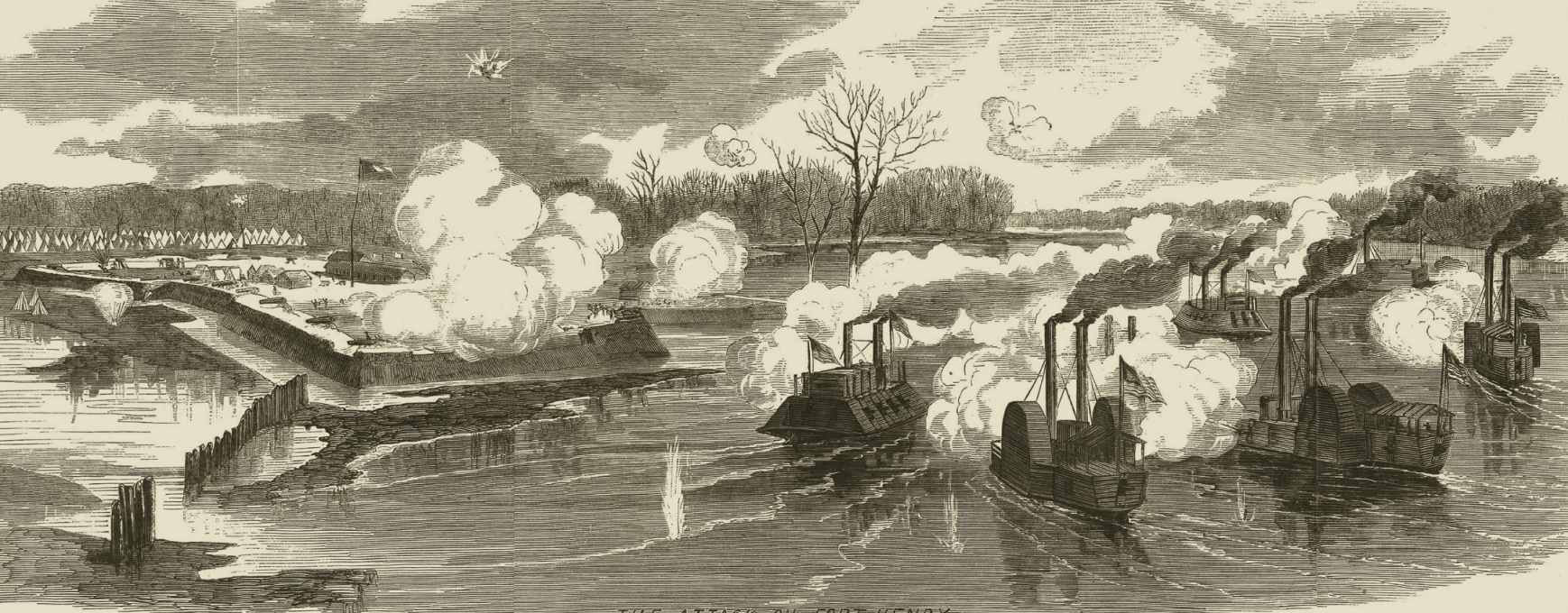
The Union gunboat attack on Fort Henry, sketched by Alexander Simplot for Harper's Weekly

On the morning of February 6, Foote's seven Union gunboats arrived at Fort Henry and established their position around 12:30 p.m. They soon opened fire from a distance at 1,700 yards (around 1,554 meters), beginning an exchange of gunfire with Fort Henry that continued for over an hour. After Tilghman rejected an initial call to surrender, the fleet continued to bombard the fort. This was its first engagement using newly designed and hastily constructed ironclads. Foote deployed the four ironclad gunboats in a line abreast, followed by the three timberclads, under the command of Seth Ledyard Phelps, which were held back for long-range, but less effective fire against the fort. The high water level of the river and the low elevation of Fort Henry's guns allowed Foote's fleet to escape serious destruction. The Confederate fire was able to hit the ironclads only where their armor was strongest. During the bombardment, all four of the Union ironclads were repeatedly hit by Confederate fire. The USS Essex was seriously damaged when a 32-pound shot from Fort Henry penetrated the ironclad, hitting the middle boiler and sending scalding steam through half the ship. Thirty-two crewmen were killed or wounded, including commander William D. Porter. The ship was out of action for the remainder of the campaign.

== Aftermath and the timberclad raid ==
After the bombardment had lasted 75 minutes, Tilghman surrendered to Foote's fleet, which had closed to within 400 yards (370 m) for a close-range bombardment. Before the battle, Tilghman told his men that he would offer an hour of resistance to allow his men additional time to escape. With only one cannon still working, down to the last few rounds due to the powder magazine being underwater, and the rest of the guns destroyed or knocked out, Tilghman ordered the Confederate flag at Fort Henry lowered and a white sheet raised on the fort's flagpole. Upon seeing the white flag, the Union gunboats immediately ceased fire. The flooded state of the fort was as such that the surrendering party sailed out of the sally port of the fort in a small launch and picked up Tilghman for the surrender negotiation on Cincinnati. Twelve officers and 82 men of the garrison surrendered; other casualties from the fort's garrison were estimated to be 15 men killed and 20 wounded. The evacuating Confederate force left all of its artillery and equipment behind. Tilghman was imprisoned for many months, and exchanged in August 15.

Tilghman wrote bitterly in his report that Fort Henry was in a "wretched military position. ... The history of military engineering records no parallel to this case." Grant sent a brief dispatch to Halleck: "Fort Henry is ours. ... I shall take and destroy Fort Donelson on the 8th and return to Fort Henry." Halleck wired Washington, D.C.: "Fort Henry is ours. The flag is reestablished on the soil of Tennessee. It will never be removed."

Grant and his troops arrived at Fort Henry at around 3 p.m. on February 6 to see that the garrison had already surrendered. McClernand's division arrived at the fort about 30 minutes later. In the meantime, Smith's division had reached the deserted Fort Heiman. If Grant had been cautious and delayed his departure by two days, the battle would have never occurred. By February 8, Fort Henry was completely underwater. On February 7, the Union gunboats Cincinnati, St. Louis, and Essex returned to Cairo with whistles blowing and flying Fort Henry's captured Confederate flags upside down. The Chicago Tribune proclaimed the battle as "one of the most complete and signal victories in the annals of the world's warfare."

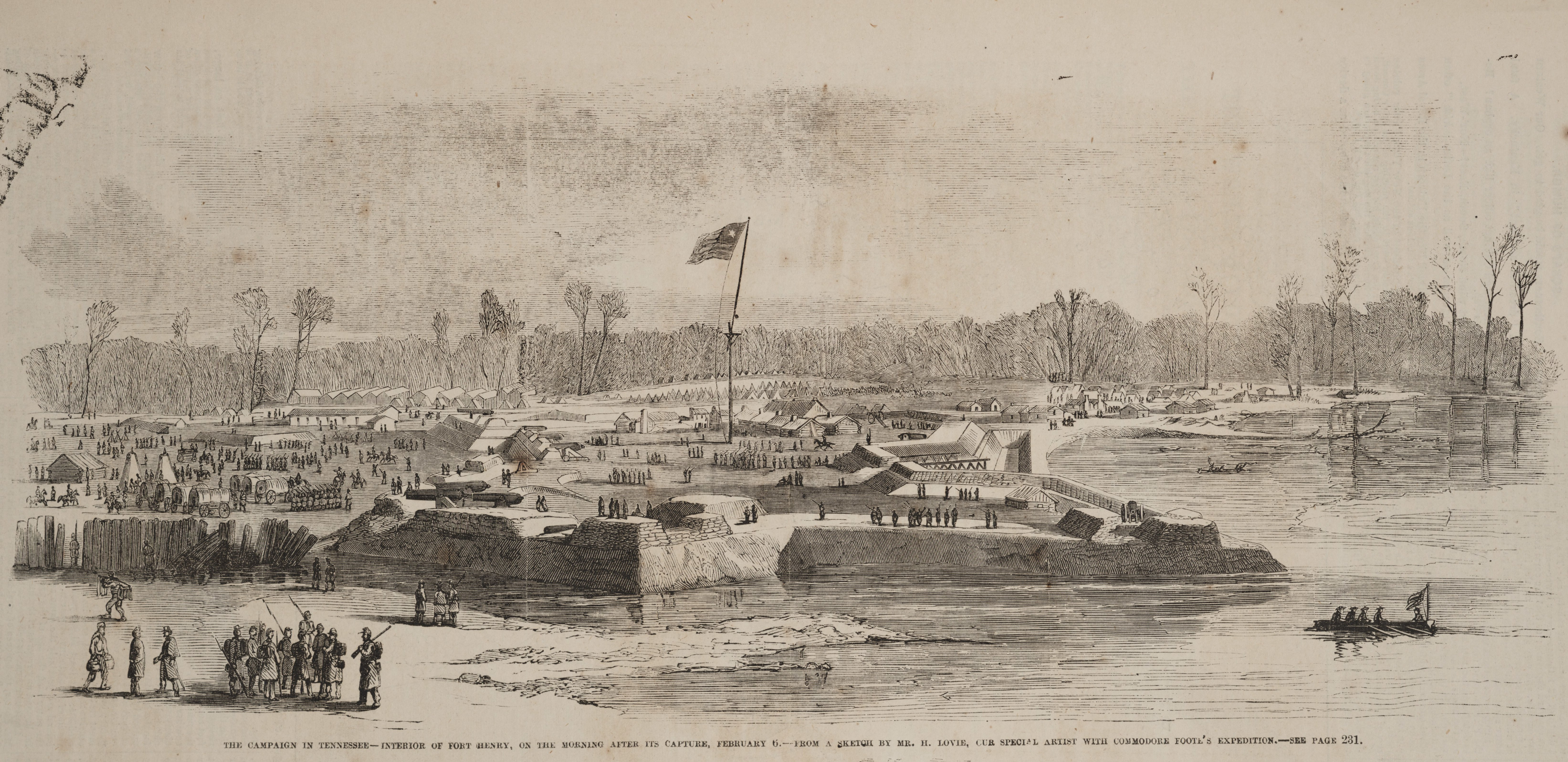
Fort Henry, on the morning after its capture, February 6, from a sketch by Henry Lovie of Frank Leslie's Illustrated

Fort Henry's fall quickly opened the Tennessee River to Union gunboats and shipping south of the Alabama border. Immediately after the surrender, Foote sent Lieutenant Phelps with the three timberclads, Tyler, Conestoga, and Lexington, on a mission upriver to destroy installations and supplies of military value. (The flotilla's ironclads had sustained damage in the bombardment of Fort Henry and were slower and less maneuverable for the mission at hand, which included pursuit of Confederate ships.) The raid reached as far as Muscle Shoals, just past Florence, Alabama, the river's navigable limit. The Union timberclads and their raiding parties destroyed supplies and an important bridge of the Memphis and Ohio Railroad, 25 miles (40 km) upriver. They also captured a variety of southern ships, including Sallie Wood, Muscle, and Eastport, an ironclad under construction. The citizens of Florence asked Phelps to spare their town and its railroad bridge. Phelps agreed, seeing no military importance to the bridge. One 19th century source described Phelps’ raid as “a perfect success. It discovered the real weakness of the Confederacy in that direction, the feasibility of marching an army into the heart of the Confederacy, and, better than all, it developed the most gratifying evidences of genuine Union feeling in Tennessee, Mississippi, and Alabama.” According to the same account, Phelps recruited several pro-Union Southerners to assist him during the raid. The Union gunboats returned safely to Fort Henry on February 12.

After the fall of Fort Donelson to Grant's army on February 16, the Tennessee and Cumberland Rivers, two major water routes in the Confederate west, became Union waterways for movement of troops and material. As Grant suspected, the Union capture of the two forts and the rivers flanked the Confederate forces at Columbus, and soon caused them to withdraw from that city and from western Kentucky.

== Preservation ==
Although closely associated with Fort Donelson, the Fort Henry site is not managed by the U.S. National Park Service as part of the Fort Donelson National Battlefield. It is currently part of the Land Between the Lakes National Recreation Area. When the Tennessee River was dammed in the 1930s, creating Kentucky Lake, the remains of Fort Henry were permanently submerged. A small navigation beacon, far from the Kentucky shoreline, marks the location of the northwest corner of the former fort. Fort Heiman was on privately owned land until October 2006, when the Calloway County, Kentucky, executive office transferred 150 acres (0.61 km^{2}) associated with that fort to the National Park Service for management as part of the Fort Donelson National Battlefield. Some of the entrenchments are still visible.

== See also ==
- List of American Civil War battles
- Bibliography of Ulysses S. Grant
- Bibliography of the American Civil War
