= Thomas W. Hamilton (Medal of Honor) =

- Born: 1833; Scotland
- Died: April 7, 1869 (aged 35–36)
- Burial place: Body buried at Sea
- Military career
- Allegiance: United States of America
- Branch: Navy
- Rank: Quartermaster
- Unit: (United States Navy) USS Cincinnati
- Awards: Medal of Honor
- Other work: Merchant Marine

Thomas W. Hamilton (1833–1869) was born in 1833 in Scotland, but later moved to Weymouth, Massachusetts. Hamilton fought in the American Civil War for the Union, and was awarded the Medal of Honor for his actions while quartermaster aboard the USS Cincinnati. During the attack on the Vicksburg batteries, May 27, 1863, Hamilton, though severely wounded, returned to his post and had to be sent below.

After serving in the military, Hamilton served in the merchant marine. On April 7, 1869, he died of consumption while serving aboard a merchant vessel in the Atlantic Ocean, and was buried at sea.

== See also ==
- USS Cincinnati
- Siege Of Vicksburg

== Namesakes ==
Thomas W. Hamilton Primary School, Weymouth, Massachusetts.
