= USS Lexington (1861) =

US Navy timberclad warship

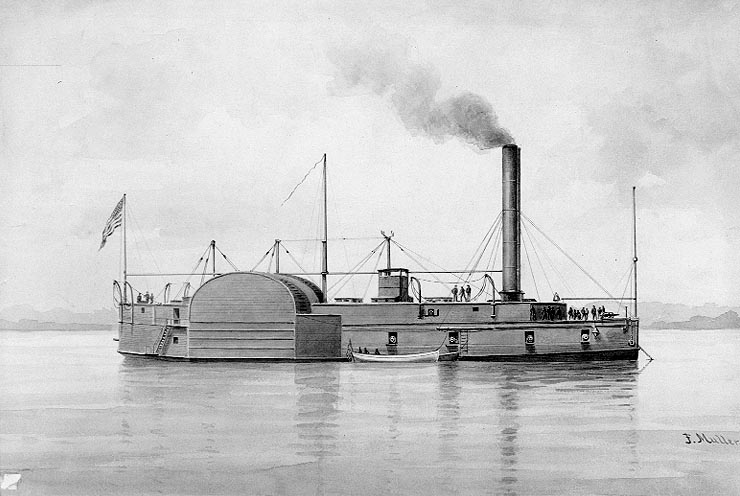
- USS Lexington

History

United States
- Name: USS Lexington
- Laid down: 1861
- Commissioned: 1861
- Decommissioned: 2 July 1865
- Fate: Sold for scrap 17 August 1865

General characteristics
- Type: Steam Gunboat
- Displacement: 448 long tons (455 t)
- Length: 177 ft 7 in (54.13 m)
- Beam: 36 ft 10 in (11.23 m)
- Propulsion: Steam engine
- Speed: 7 knots (13 km/h; 8.1 mph)
- Armament: 4 × 8 in (200 mm) Dahlgren smoothbore guns; 2 × 32-pounder guns

The third USS Lexington was a timberclad gunboat in the United States Navy during the American Civil War.

== Purchase and conversion ==
Lexington was built as a sidewheel steamer at Pittsburgh, Pennsylvania, in 1861 and was purchased by the War Department and converted into a gunboat at Cincinnati, Ohio, under the direction of Commander John Rodgers.

The gunboat, operated by the navy, joined the army's Western Flotilla at Cairo, Illinois, 12 August 1861. On 22 August, she seized steamer W. B. Terry at Paducah, Kentucky, and on 4 September, with Tyler, she engaged Confederate gunboat Jackson and southern shore batteries at Hickman and Columbus, Kentucky. On 6 September, the two gunboats spearheaded General Ulysses S. Grant's drive to seize strategic Paducah and Smithland, Kentucky, at the mouths of the Tennessee and Cumberland Rivers. In his first use of strength afloat, Grant countered a Confederate move into the state, helping preserve Kentucky for the Union and foreshadowing his skillful use of naval mobility and support during the coming campaigns which divided the Confederacy and won the entire Mississippi system for the Union.

Lexington's next action came on the 10th when she and Conestoga silenced a Confederate battery and damaged Jackson at Lucas Bend, Missouri, while covering a troop advance. An 8-inch shell from Lexington exploded in Jackson's starboard wheelhouse causing severe damage. Only the powerful batteries on the bluffs at Columbus, Kentucky, saved Jackson and another Southern steamer from capture.

== Battle of Belmont ==
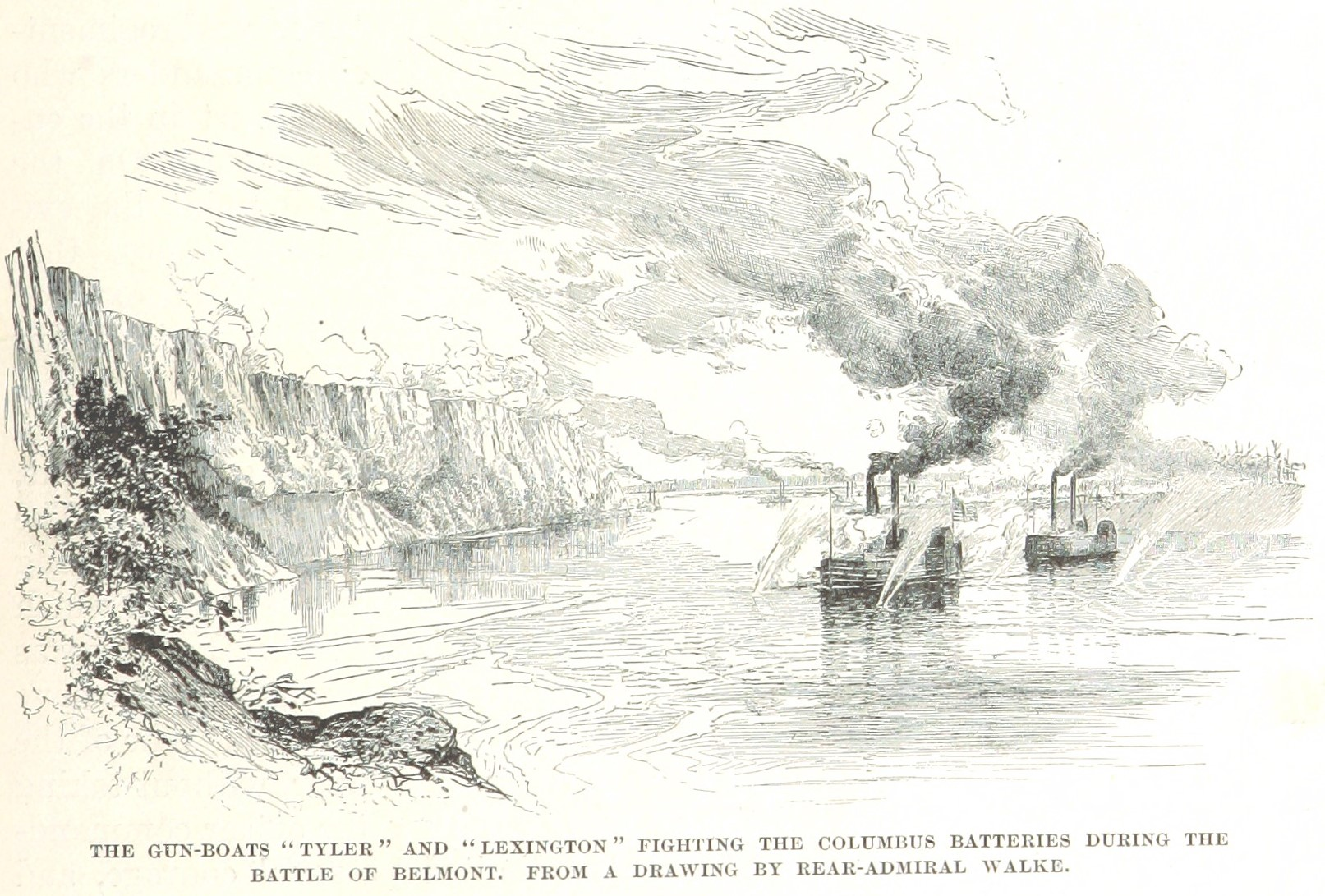
Lexington with Tyler at Belmont

After accompanying an expedition to Owensboro, Kentucky, on 22–25 September, Lexington again engaged the batteries of Columbus on 7 October. With Tyler a month later, she protected General Grant's army during the Battle of Belmont silencing enemy batteries which opposed the landings. When a large number of fresh Confederate troops threatened Grant's men, well directed fire of grape and canister from Lexington and Tyler scattered the Southern reinforcements enabling the Union soldiers to reach safety on their transports.

== Battle of Fort Henry ==
The Western Flotilla steamed up the Tennessee River to attack Fort Henry which guarded this water approach to the South's heartland. Although the operation was originally planned as a joint expedition, heavy rains for 2 days before the attack delayed troop movements so the gunboats attacked alone 6 February 1862. Accurate fire from the gunboats pounded the fort and forced Brigadier General Lloyd Tilghman, CSA, with all but four of his defending guns useless, to strike his flag. In continuing operations the three days following the capitulation of Fort Henry, Tyler, Conestoga and Lexington swept the Tennessee for Confederate transports, seized the unfinished steamer Eastport, and destroyed a railroad bridge spanning the river.

== Battle of Shiloh ==
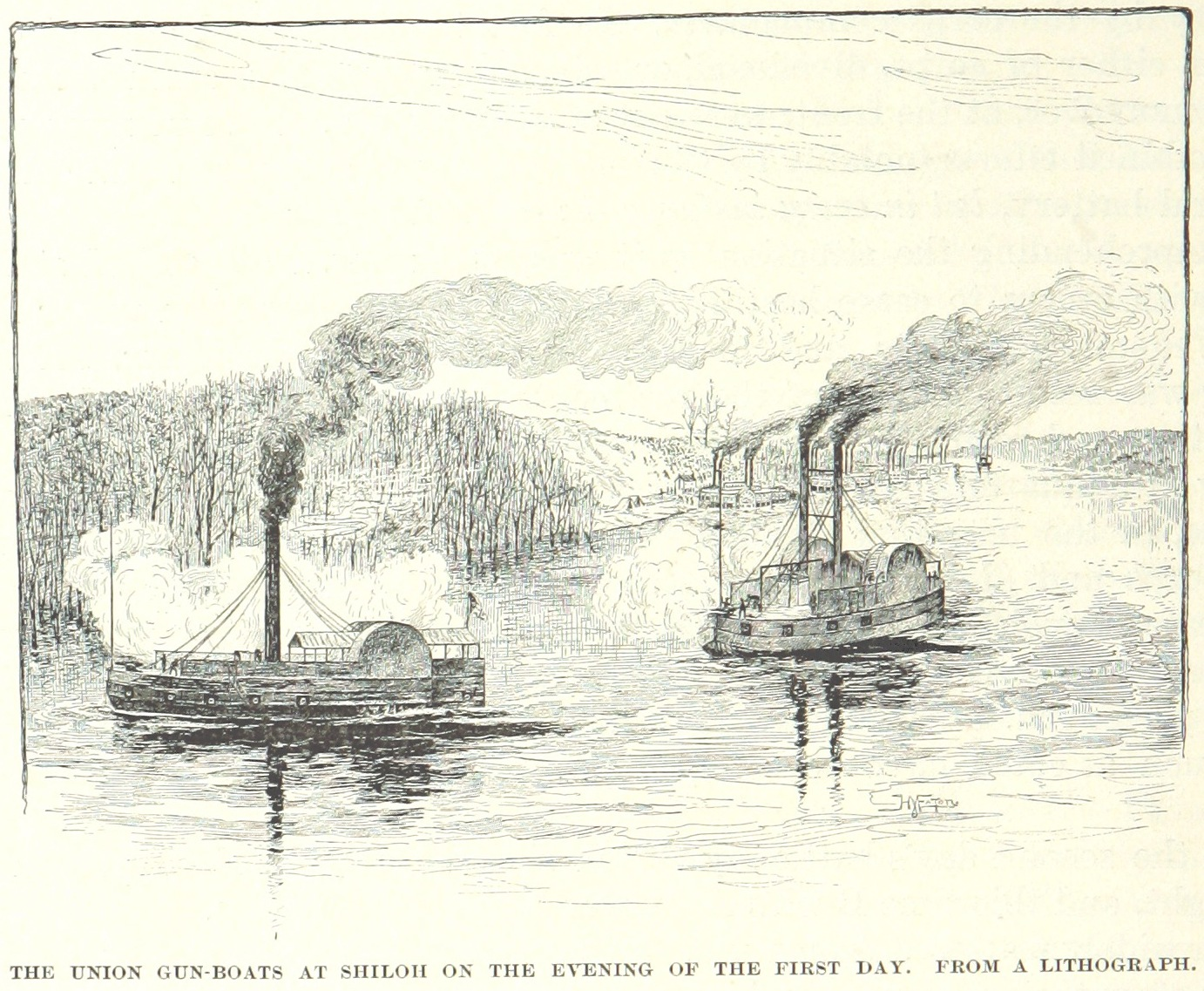
Lexington with Tyler at Shiloh

After repairs Lexington rejoined Tyler protecting army transports and supporting troop movements along the Tennessee River. On 1 March the gunboats engaged Confederate forces fortifying Shiloh (Pittsburg Landing) Tennessee. They landed a party of sailors and army sharpshooters to reconnoiter Confederate strength in the area. They then moved further upstream and engaged a Confederate battery at Chickasaw, Alabama, on the 12th. Later in the month they steamed upstream to Eastport, Mississippi, where they exchanged fire with Southern artillery.

The capture of Fort Henry and Fort Donelson opened serious breaches in the Confederancy's outer defense line which Grant was quick to exploit. Southern troops commanded by Gen. Albert Sidney Johnston, made a major effort to stem his advance in the Battle of Shiloh and came close to overwhelming the Union troops. Major General Leonidas Polk, CSA, reported that the Confederate forces "were within from 150 to 400 yards of the enemy's position, and nothing seemed wanting to complete the most brilliant victory of the war but to press forward and make a vigorous assault on the demoralized remnant of his forces. At this juncture his gunboats dropped down the river, near the landing where his troops were collected, and opened a tremendous cannonade of shot and shell over the bank, in the direction from where our forces were approaching." This timely support from Lexington and Tyler swung the delicate balance of forces back to the Union side and saved Grant's men from disaster.

After the day was over, the Lexington and Tyler spent the night bombarding the Confederate army, which had settled down in Union camps they had captured early in the morning assault. Firing into the darkness, the gunboats caused few casualties, but they did prevent many Confederate soldiers from getting any sleep.

== Battle of Saint Charles ==
Lexington continued to support army operations in the Tennessee River until steaming down the Mississippi with Conestoga, St. Louis, and Mound City to enter the White River, 14 June. While the Union gunboats, were capturing St. Charles, Arkansas, 17 June a direct hit exploded Mound City's steam drum scalding many of her men. The injured crewmen were treated on Lexington as she pushed 63 miles further upriver to Crooked Point Cut-off where shallow water forced her to turn back. The gunboat then returned to the Mississippi to protect army transports from guerilla bands which attacked from the river banks.

== Yazoo River, Fort Hindman, and Cumberland River operations ==
Lexington, which transferred to the navy with the other ships of the Western Flotilla on 1 October 1862, participated in the joint expedition up the Yazoo River to attack Vicksburg, Mississippi from the rear. On 27 December, while clearing mines from the river, the Union gunboats fought off heavy attacks by Confederate batteries. The next day they provided cover fire for General Sherman's troops during an attack on Confederate-held Chickasaw Bayou. "Through these operations," David Dixon Porter wrote, "the Navy did everything that could be done to ensure the success of General Sherman's movement." Though the navy supplied shore bombardment from the squadron and created diversionary movements, the Union troops, hindered by heavy rains and faced by the timely arrival of Confederate reinforcements, were forced to withdraw.

On 4 January 1863, the gunboats and army transports headed up the White River, Arkansas, to attack Fort Hindman. The squadron covered the landing of troops on the 9th by shelling Confederate rifle pits. The next day, though the Army was not in position to press the attack, the Union ships moved to within 60 yards of the staunchly defended fort and began a blistering engagement which softened the works for the next day's assault. When the Union troops charged the position on the 11th, the gunboats resumed their well-directed fire and silenced every southern gun. After this defeat the Confederates evacuated other positions on the White and Saint Charles rivers.

Meanwhile, Confederate raiders were threatening to wrest control of the Cumberland Valley from the Union. Answering General William Rosecrans' appeal for naval support, Lexington got underway for the Cumberland River on 25 January. The joint army-navy cooperation kept the upper rivers open to the Union and prevented an effective Confederate counteroffensive. Frequently fighting off attacks from Southern snipers and flying batteries, Lexington escorted transports and destroyed Confederate positions along the banks. On 3 February with five other ships she helped repulse a Confederate attempt to retake Fort Donelson. When they reached the scene of the battle they found the defending troops "out of ammunition and entirely surrounded by the rebels in overwhelming numbers, but still holding them in check." Lexington routed the Confederates in a hurry.

== Battle of Milliken's Bend ==
Ordered down the Mississippi on 2 June to support final operations against Vicksburg, Lexington joined Choctaw in defending Union troops at Milliken's Bend, Mississippi, from the assault of numerically superior Confederate soldiers on the 7th. For the next month she continued to operate against the mighty Confederate fortress until it fell on 4 July.

After reconnaissance work and patrol duty in the Mississippi during the summer, Lexington was ordered back to the Tennessee River on 29 October to assist General Sherman at the beginning of his drive through the Confederate heartland. However, at the end of February 1864, she returned to the Mississippi for operations in support of the Red River Campaign. With paddle wheel monitor Osage and four other gunboats she moved up the Black River to gather information about Confederate sharpshooters as they entered the Ouachita River and proceeded up the Bayou Louis where shallowing water compelled them to return, capturing Confederate artillery and large quantities of cotton before reaching the mouth of the Red River on 5 March. A week later the Mississippi Squadron moved up the Red River in force.

== Red River ==
The Confederate defenders were driven off at Simmesport and Maj. Gen. A. J. Smith's troops marched on Fort DeRussy, which was taken by the combined land and naval forces on 14 March 1864. The next day Lexington with gunboat Ouachita, followed by the Eastport, pushed on toward Alexandria, Louisiana, chasing Confederate steamers fleeing toward safety above the Alexandria rapids; but the Union ships arrived less than an hour too late to capture six steamers which had succeeding in getting over the falls. Confederate steamer Countess which grounded in flight and a barge left behind were burned to prevent capture. The army transports arrived the next day and troops were landed to occupy that town.

On 7 April, Lexington and five other gunboats steamed over the falls toward Shreveport, Louisiana, to support General Nathaniel Prentiss Banks who was advancing up the valley. Three days later the hulk of steamer New Falls City, sunk in a narrow stretch of the river near Springfield Landing blocked the progress of the expedition. Before this obstruction could be removed, word arrived from Major General Banks of his defeat at the Battle of Sabine Crossroads near Grand Encore and retreat toward Pleasant Hill. The transports and troops of Brig. Gen. Thomas Kilby Smith were ordered to return to the major force and join Banks. The high point of the Union's Red River campaign had been reached. From this point, with falling water levels and increased Confederate shore fire the gunboats would face a desperate battle to avoid being trapped above the Alexandria rapids.

In the Battle of Blair's Landing, Lexington silenced the shore battery but the Confederate cavalry poured a hail of musket fire into the rest of the squadron. The rebels fought with unusual pertinacity for over an hour, delivering the heaviest and most concentrated fire of musketry. What Porter described as "this curious affair,...a fight between infantry and gunboats", was finally decided by the gunboats' fire, which inflicted heavy losses on the Confederates, including the death of their commander, General Thomas Green. This engagement featured the use of a unique instrument, developed by Chief Engineer Thomas Doughty of Osage and later described by Thomas O. Selfridge Jr. as "a method of sighting the turret from the outside, by means of what would now be called a periscope..." The high banks of the Red River posed a great difficulty for the ships' gunners in aiming their cannon from water level. Doughty's ingenious apparatus helped to solve the problem. Thus was the periscope, a familiar sight on modern gun turrets and on submarines, brought into Civil War use on the western waters.

Upon reaching Grand Ecore the fleet faced a dangerous situation. The Red River, normally high until late June, had fallen so much that the gunboats could not pass over the rapids and it seemed that the better part of the Mississippi Squadron was doomed to destruction as the Union Army made plans for evacuation. However, Lieutenant Colonel Joseph Bailey USA, proposed a plan for building a series of dams across the rocks of the falls and raising the water. A center opening would let the ships ride out on the crest of the water. On 9 May 1864, the dam had nearly reached completion but the pressure of the water became so great that it swept away two stone barges which swung in below the dam on one side. Seeing this accident, Admiral Porter mounted a horse and rode up to where upper vessels were anchored and ordered Lexington to get underway.

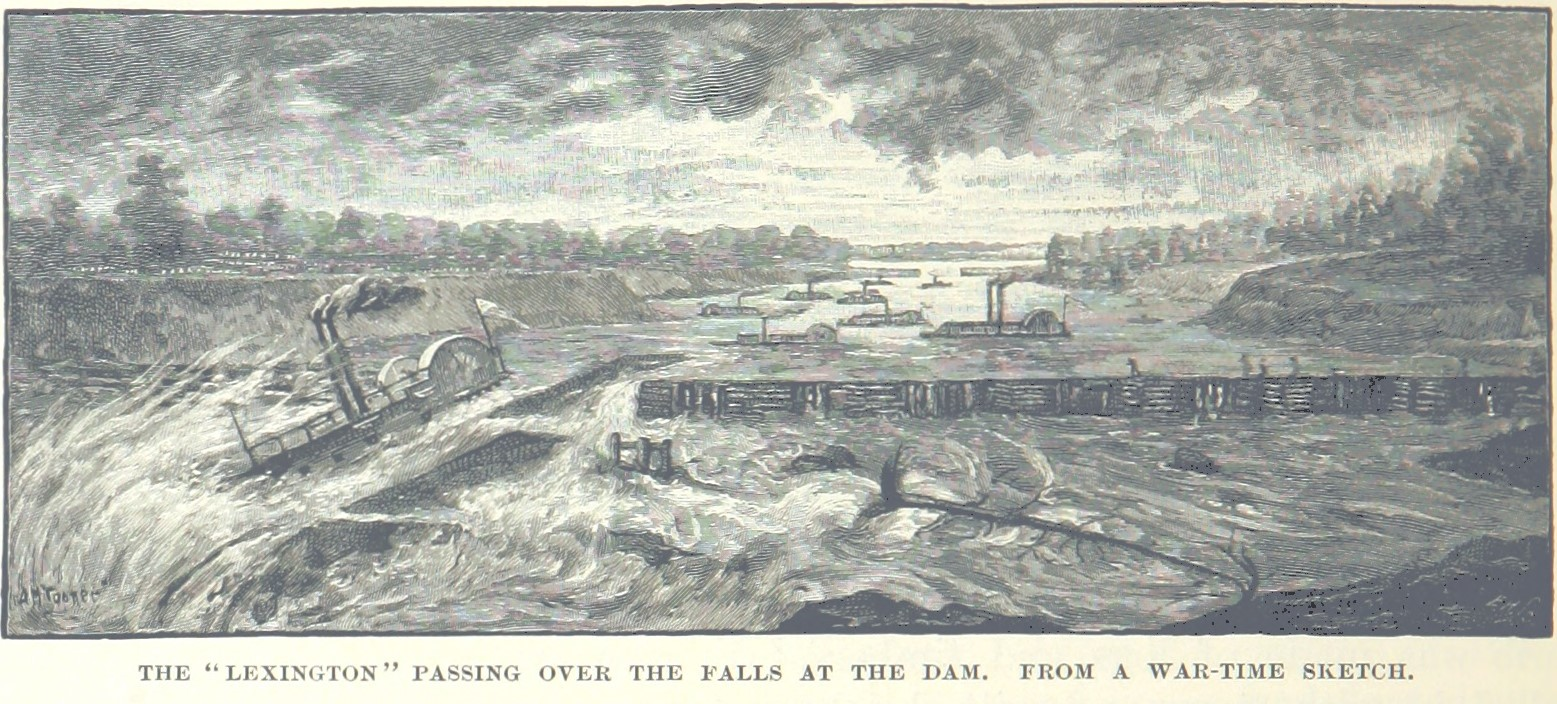
Lexington crosses over the falls

Lieutenant Bache succeeded in getting Lexington over the upper falls, then steered her directly for the opening in the dam where the furiously raging waters seemed to promise only her destruction. She entered the gap in the dam with a full head of steam and pitched down the powerful torrent with several heavy rolls, hung for a moment on the rocks below, then reached the calm, deep water to the ringing cheers of some 30,000 voices. She was soon followed by the remainder of the vessels and the Union's valuable fleet was saved.

On 15 June 1864, Lexington seized the Confederate steamers Mattie, M. Walt and R. E. Hill, at Beulah Landing, Mississippi, with cotton on board. She repulsed an attack on White River Station, Arkansas, on 22 June 1864. For the rest of the war she continued patrol and convoy duty.

She arrived at Mound City, Illinois on 5 June 1865 and decommissioned there on 2 July 1865. Lexington was sold to Thomas Scott and Woodburn on 17 August 1865.

== See also ==
- Seth Ledyard Phelps (gunboat captain active in the Mississippi River Squadron and Red River Campaign)
