= Henry Dow =

- Born: 1840; Scotland
- Died: Unknown
- Military career
- Allegiance: United States of America
- Branch: United States Navy
- Rank: Boatswain's Mate
- Unit: Cincinnati
- Conflicts: Siege of Vicksburg
- Awards: Medal of Honor

Boatswain's Mate Henry Dow (born 1840) was a Scottish soldier who fought in the American Civil War. Dow received the United States' highest award for bravery during combat, the Medal of Honor, for his action aboard the Cincinnati during the Siege of Vicksburg on 27 May 1863. He was honored with the award on 10 July 1863.

== Biography ==
Dow was born in Scotland in 1840. He enlisted into the United States Navy from Illinois.

== Medal of Honor citation ==
Served on board the U.S.S. Cincinnati during the attack on the Vicksburg batteries and at the time of her sinking, 27 May 1863. Engaging the enemy in a fierce battle, the Cincinnati, amidst an incessant fire of shot and shell, continued to fire her guns to the last, though so penetrated by enemy shellfire that her fate was sealed. Serving courageously throughout this action, Dow carried out his duties to the end on this proud ship that went down with "her colors nailed to the mast.".

== See also ==
- List of American Civil War Medal of Honor recipients: A–F
