= USS Conestoga (1861) =

Boat converted by the navy into 572-ton river gunboat

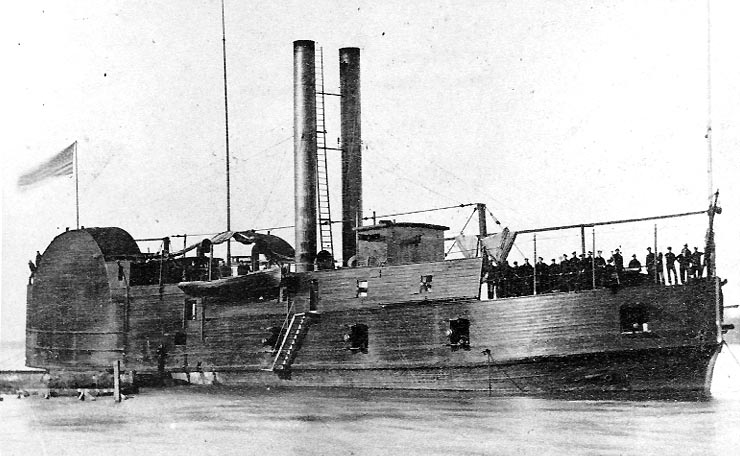
- USS Conestoga, photographed during the Civil War

History

United States
- Name: USS Conestoga
- Namesake: Conestoga wagon
- Fate: Sunk in collision 8 March 1864

General characteristics
- Displacement: 572 ton
- Propulsion: Stern Wheel Paddle steamer

USS Conestoga was originally a civilian side-wheel towboat built at Brownsville, Pennsylvania, in 1859. She was acquired by the U.S. Army in June 1861 and converted to a 572-ton "timberclad" river gunboat for use by the Western Gunboat Flotilla, with officers provided by the navy.

== Civil War service ==
Conestoga's first combat action took place in September 1861, when she engaged CSS Jackson near Lucas Bend, Kentucky. Other skirmishes punctuated the routine of river patrol service into 1862. In February, she participated in an expedition up the Tennessee River that led to the capture of Forts Henry and Donelson. Later in the month, she saw action at Columbus, Kentucky, a Confederate strongpoint on the Mississippi River.

During the rest of her service, Conestoga continued to operate along the rivers. She took part in the bombardment of Saint Charles, Arkansas, in June 1862 and was formally transferred to the navy in October of that year. In April and July 1863, she was involved in expeditions to Palmyra, Tennessee, and up the Red River, Louisiana. The following March, she went up Louisiana's Black and Ouachita Rivers. Soon after, on 8 March 1864, USS Conestoga was sunk in a collision with USS General Price.
