= Actions near Alexandria =

1864 battle of the American Civil War

- Part of the American Civil War
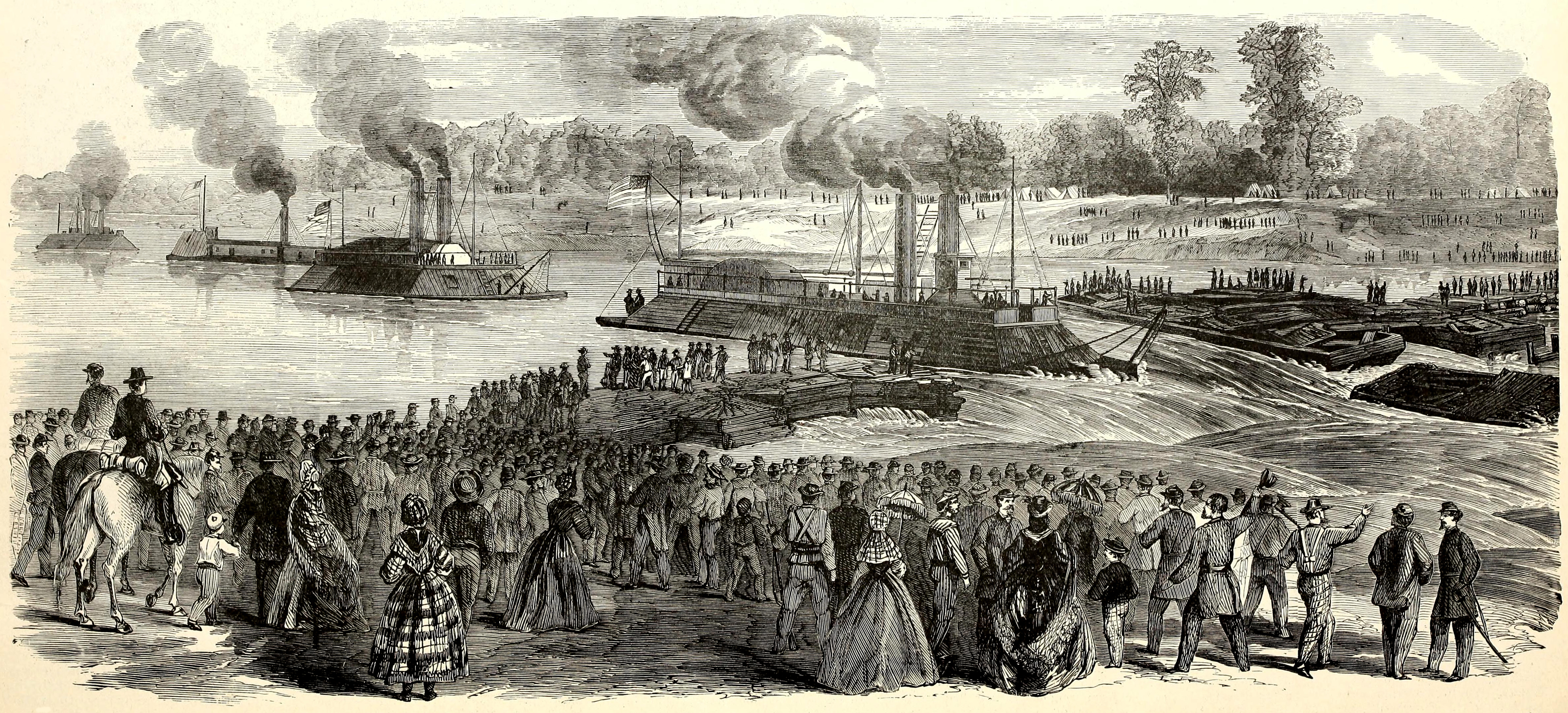
- Union gunboats safely pass through Bailey's Dam at Alexandria, Louisiana.
Date	April 24 – May 13, 1864
Location	Alexandria, Louisiana 31°17′34″N 92°27′33″W
Result	Inconclusive

Belligerents
United States (Union)	Confederate States

Commanders and leaders
Nathaniel P. Banks; David Dixon Porter	Richard Taylor

Units involved
Department of the Gulf	Department of West Louisiana

Strength
33,500	6,000
- Location in Louisiana

The Actions near Alexandria (April 24 – May 13, 1864) saw a Confederate States Army force commanded by Major General Richard Taylor surround a greatly superior Union Army led by Major General Nathaniel P. Banks and a United States Navy flotilla commanded by Rear Admiral David Dixon Porter at Alexandria, Louisiana. Porter's gunboats were trapped above the double falls in the Red River by low water. Banks' army was compelled to halt its retreat to keep Porter's vessels from being scuttled or from falling into Confederate hands.

Meanwhile, Taylor positioned his scanty forces to blockade the Union forces within Alexandria. For several days, the Confederate force was able to block all traffic in the Red River. Porter's fleet was saved when an innovative Union engineer built Bailey's Dam which raised the water level enough to float Porter's gunboats over the falls and into deeper water. On May 13, Banks' army brushed aside Taylor's troops and marched downstream. Though Banks ordered Alexandria to be spared, Union soldiers burned down most of the city when they left.

== Background ==
Because his administration felt threatened by the French-backed regime of Emperor Maximilian in Mexico, President Abraham Lincoln wanted the United States flag raised over part of Texas. Major General Henry Halleck ordered Banks, over his objections, to mount an invasion of Texas using the Red River corridor. Banks was to ascend Bayou Teche with 17,000 troops while Major General Andrew Jackson Smith with 10,000 men (three divisions of XVI Corps and XVII Corps) would move up the Red River accompanied by the 13 ironclads and 7 light-draft gunboats of Porter's river fleet. Major General Frederick Steele and 15,000 men were ordered to march south from Little Rock, Arkansas, and join the first two columns, but they started too late and never connected with Banks.

On March 18, 1864, A. J. Smith's column occupied Alexandria and was joined by Banks' main body a few days later. Despite low water in the Red River, Banks ordered an advance on Shreveport, Louisiana, and his army occupied Natchitoches on April 2. At the Battle of Mansfield on April 8, Taylor defeated Banks and forced the Union army back. Though Taylor's attack was repelled at the Battle of Pleasant Hill on April 9, Banks elected to withdraw to Grand Ecore near Natchitoches. Meanwhile, Taylor's superior, General Edmund Kirby Smith took most of the Confederate infantry to fight Steele's column, leaving Taylor with only 5,200 troops. On April 21, Banks decided to abandon the campaign and retreat from Grand Ecore. This decision was influenced by an order to return A. J. Smith's troops to Major General William T. Sherman by April 10. At the Battle of Monett's Ferry on April 23, the Union army forced its way through a blocking force sent by Taylor.

== Actions ==
=== Arrival at Alexandria ===
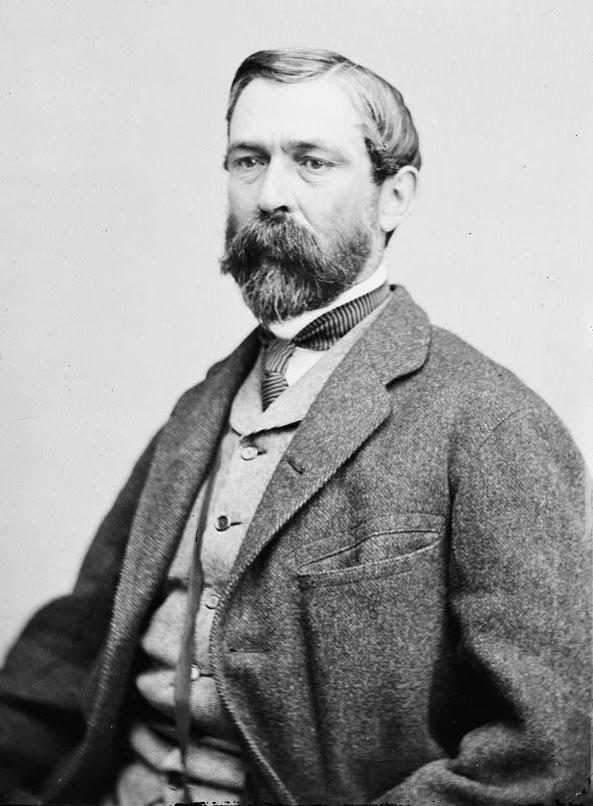
Richard Taylor

The different elements of Banks' army reached Alexandria between April 24 and 26. The rearguard was composed of A. J. Smith's troops who fought off Confederate pursuit and burned any buildings they found along their route. Meanwhile, Porter sent reports to his superiors in Washington, D.C. complaining of Banks' failures, leading Lieutenant General Ulysses S. Grant and Halleck to consider replacing Banks. Meanwhile, the last few vessels of the river flotilla fought through a Confederate ambush in the Action of 26–27 April 1864 where the Cane River emptied into the Red River. The ironclad USS Eastport had to be scuttled and two pump boats were lost, but Porter himself in the tinclad USS Cricket and two other badly damaged gunboats escaped. These were escorted to Alexandria by two more warships.

On April 26, Major General John Alexander McClernand arrived at Alexandria to assume command of the XIII Corps. McClernand brought the 2,600 troops of Brigadier General Michael Kelly Lawler's brigade and 1,000 replacements destined for the XVI Corps. This brought Banks' army to a total of 33,500 men. Banks deployed the XIX Corps on the right flank, XIII Corps in the center, and XVI Corps on the left flank. The Union soldiers fortified Alexandria with a double line of breastworks hardened by artillery redoubts.

Taylor posted his small forces to blockade the much larger Union army within Alexandria. He hoped to either capture the Union fleet or force his opponents to destroy it. According to historian William Riley Brooksher, Taylor sent Brigadier General James Patrick Major with 1,000 soldiers to David's Ferry, downstream from Alexandria. He placed Brigadier General William Steele with 1,000 men north and west of Alexandria, and Brigadier General Arthur P. Bagby Jr. and 1,000 soldiers south of the city. Brigadier General Camille de Polignac and 1,200 infantry were positioned to support Major or Bagby. Brigadier General St. John Richardson Liddell with 700 men covered the east bank of the Red River. However, Taylor reported that Polignac's division numbered 2,000 troops and estimated his total strength as 6,000.

=== Porter's gunboats trapped ===
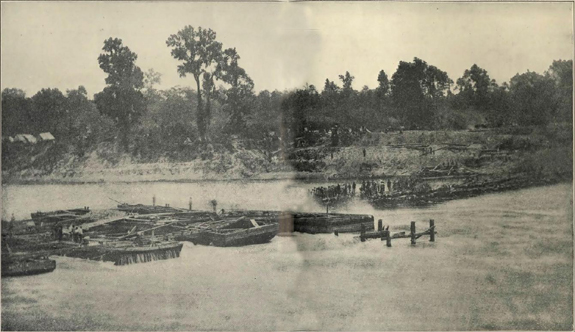
Contemporary photograph of the dam.

At Alexandria, the water depth at the double falls was only 3.25 ft (1.0 m), while the gunboats needed a depth of 7 ft (2.1 m) to get through. Between the falls, the river channel was only 30 ft (9.1 m) wide in some places. The Cricket proved able to pass the falls into deeper water, but the USS Carondelet, USS Chillicothe, USS Fort Hindman, USS Lexington, USS Louisville, USS Mound City, USS Neosho, USS Osage, USS Ozark, and USS Pittsburgh were trapped above the upper falls.

On April 27, Major General David Hunter reached Alexandria with orders from Lieutenant General Ulysses S. Grant to terminate the campaign immediately and start operations against Mobile, Alabama. However, at this time it was impossible for Banks to move his army without abandoning Porter's fleet. Hunter believed that the ships could not be saved and ought to be scuttled. He reported to Grant that there was an alarming amount of illicit trading in cotton, and that Banks should be replaced. Hunter also convinced Grant that A. J. Smith's troops should be left at Alexandria until Porter's gunboats could escape.

=== Bailey's Dam ===
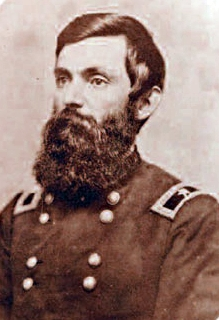
Joseph Bailey

Lieutenant Colonel Joseph Bailey, an acting engineer on Major General William B. Franklin's staff submitted a plan to raise the water level to 7 ft (2.1 m) by damming the river and Franklin approved it. The plan was placed before Porter, who accepted it, as did Banks and Hunter. On April 29, Banks issued the orders and Bailey began the work the following day. Bailey's dam was located at the lower falls. Over 3,000 soldiers were employed on the project.

On the Alexandria side of the river, the two Black regiments from Colonel George D. Robinson's engineer brigade and a 400-man detachment from Colonel William H. Dickey's African-American brigade were set to work building a crib dam. The cribs were built by tearing down buildings for their lumber and then filled with quarried stone, bricks, or machinery. On the Pineville side, opposite Alexandria, details from New York, Maine, and XIII Corps regiments felled trees for a tree dam. The trees were sunk and held in place with sand, brush, and bricks. When the space between the tree dam and the crib dam narrowed to 150 ft (46 m), four large coal barges loaded with stone were sunk in the gap. Porter, who loathed Banks, had to admit, "To General Banks personally I am indebted for the happy manner in which he forwarded this enterprise, giving it his whole attention, night and day, scarcely sleeping while the work was going on."

=== Clashes ===
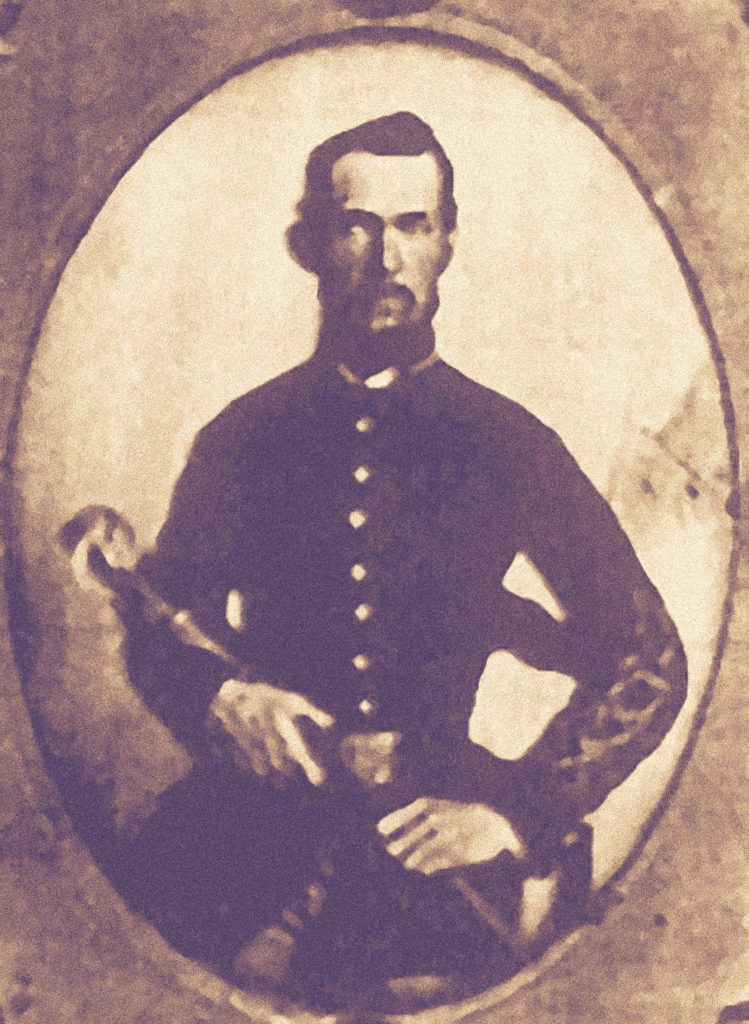
George W. Baylor

On April 30, a Union cavalry brigade advancing from Pineville was counterattacked by Liddell's force and defeated with the loss of 30 men at Hudnot's Plantation. On May 1, Steele pushed back the Union outposts on the Rapides road to within 3 mi (4.8 km) of Alexandria. On May 2, a foraging party from the 3rd Rhode Island Cavalry and the 83rd Ohio Infantry suffered 12 casualties near Governor Moore's mansion. On May 3, the Confederates made a drive along the Bayou Robert road. During this period, the 64th U.S. Colored Infantry sustained 7 casualties at Ashwood Landing. Taylor believed that Banks' troops were demoralized, hungry, and sick, and hoped to achieve a major victory.

On May 1, George Wythe Baylor's brigade and Captain J. A. A. West's Louisiana Battery took position at Wilson's Landing, 30 mi (48 km) downstream from Alexandria. When the Union river transport Emma appeared, Colonel Isham Chisum's 2nd Texas Partisan Rangers galloped after it, forced it to surrender, and burned the vessel. On May 3, Baylor's men ambushed the transport City Belle with 700 men of the 120th Ohio Infantry as it came upstream. A shot from West's battery struck the vessel's boiler, forcing the Union soldiers to abandon it. Half of the soldiers were captured while others escaped to the opposite bank. After this debacle, Lieutenant Commander Kidder Breese prohibited transports from using the Red River unless escorted.

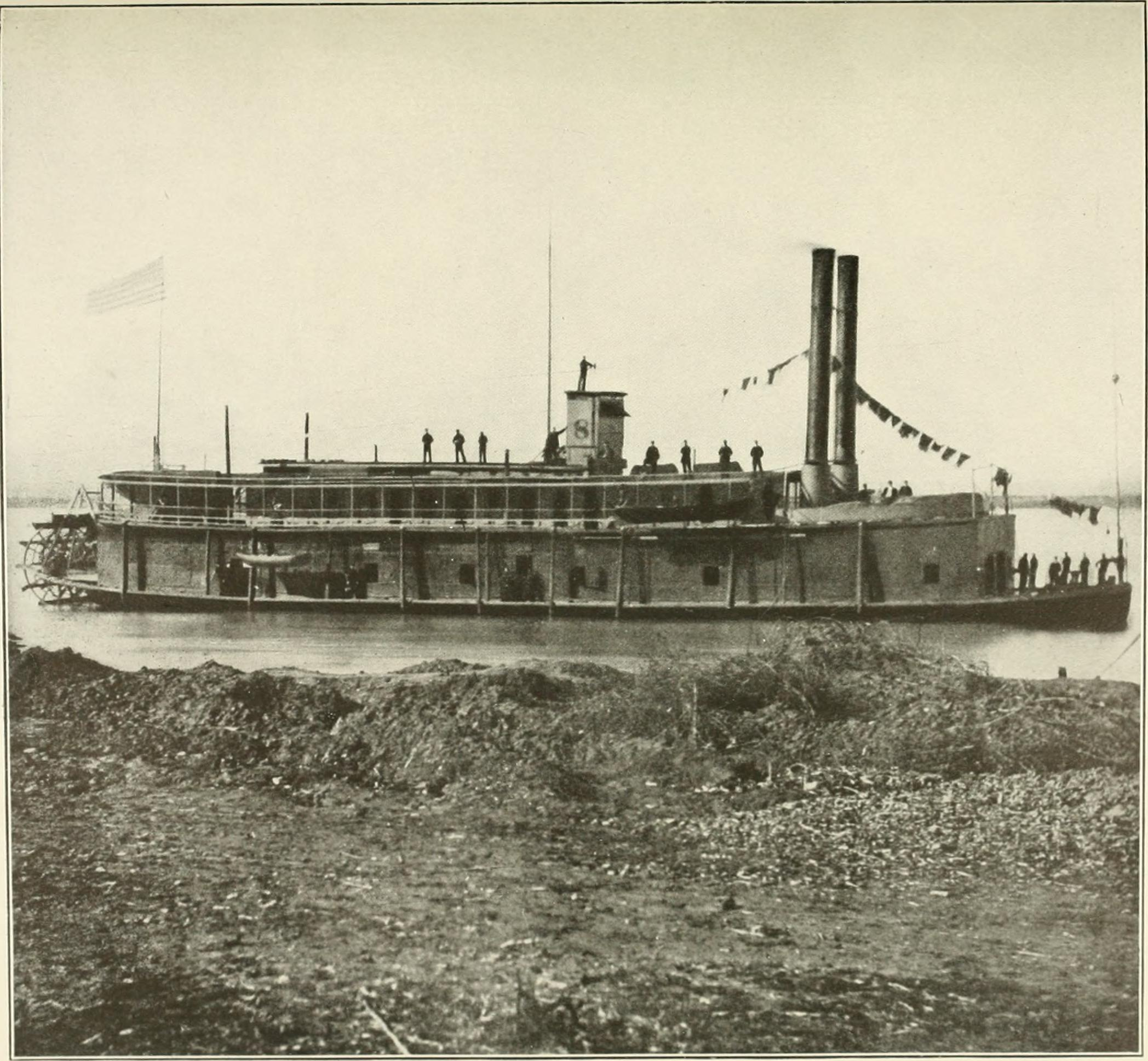
USS Signal

On May 4, the river transport John Warner headed downstream from Alexandria with the 56th Ohio Infantry and escorted by the tinclad USS Signal and gunboat USS Covington. The soldiers were finally getting to enjoy their veteran's furlough. The next morning, the three vessels reached Dunn's Bayou where Baylor's men waited in ambush. West's battery disabled the John Warner and it drifted into the bank where it endured a terrific blast of rifle fire which caused 125 casualties. The transport ran up the white flag as the survivors of the regiment scrambled up the opposite riverbank. When the two gunboats turned to flee upriver, the engine of the Signal was knocked out. The Covington tried to tow the tinclad away but its own steering was disabled and it drove into the opposite bank where the Confederate guns pounded it. Finally, the Covington's commander ordered the gunboat to be set on fire as the crew fled into the woods. The Confederate riflemen then concentrated on the helpless Signal and forced it to surrender. In five days, Baylor's 1,000 men and 4 guns inflicted 500 casualties while suffering fewer than 10 men wounded.

On May 6, seven Federal river transports headed upriver, three with reinforcements and four with supplies. These were Brigadier General Fitz Henry Warren's XIII Corps troops, coming from Texas. They encountered Confederate artillery and turned back. Instead, they occupied Fort DeRussy. Banks' army and Porter's fleet were now completely isolated.

=== Porter's gunboats escape ===
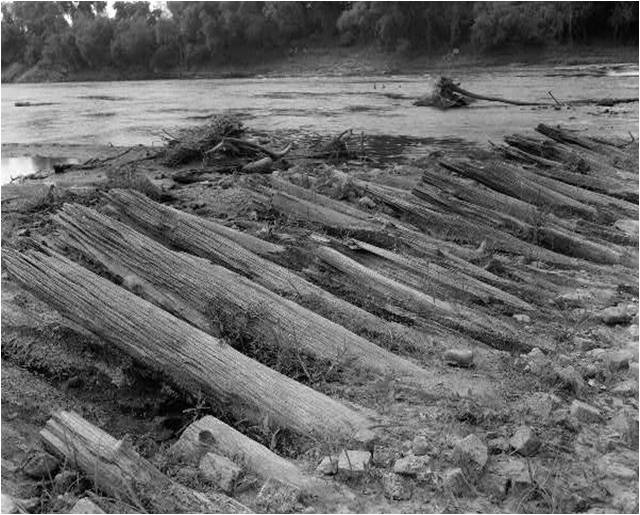
Parts of Bailey's Dam were still visible in 1984.

On the afternoon of May 8, Bailey's Dam was completed and the Fort Hindman, Neosho, and Osage passed the upper falls and moved into the pool above the dam. However, for some reason, the other gunboats failed to budge. At 2:00 am, an anxious Banks sent Porter a note pointing out that the dam was about to burst, but Porter failed to respond. At 5:00 am on May 9, two of the coal barges were swept away by the current and the pent-up water began surging through the opening. This finally roused Porter, who galloped upstream to order the gunboats to move. Only the Lexington was ready; it steamed into the gap in the dam and safely made it through. After seeing this, the Fort Hindman, Neosho, and Osage all dashed through the gap successfully, with only the Neosho suffering minor damage.

The failure to move the gunboats over the falls frustrated Banks' hopes to quickly abandon Alexandria. He urged Porter to get his gunboats ready, and this time the admiral made sure his vessels were prepared. Guns and anchors were removed and 11 obsolete 32-pounder guns were destroyed in order to decrease the gunboats' draft. Iron plates were sunk in the river and replaced by a coat of coal tar to simulate armor. Seeing that the original dam was irreparable, Bailey tried building a wing dam, but it did not raise the water level high enough. Lieutenant Colonel Uri B. Piersall of the 99th U.S. Colored Infantry presented a plan to build a bracket dam, "to put a foot of water under those boats", and Bailey authorized the work to proceed. A diagonal bracket dam was built below the upper falls to confine the river to a narrow channel. On May 11, Carondelet, Mound City, and Pittsburgh safely crossed the upper falls. The following day, the Chillicothe, Louisville, and Ozark passed the upper falls. By May 13, all the vessels ran through the gap in the dam. Porter's crews rearmed and reloaded their gunboats.

The Confederates blundered in not attempting to interfere with the Federal dam-building, though they were too weak to stop Banks' troops for very long. The Union troops also wondered why their opponents had not tried to obstruct their efforts. Taylor demanded that Liddell blockade the river and harass the Union dam builders, but Liddell's force was too weak to do either. When Taylor then issued a contradictory order to move his command downstream to support Major, a frustrated Liddell complied, but he then submitted his resignation; Taylor accepted it.

== Aftermath ==
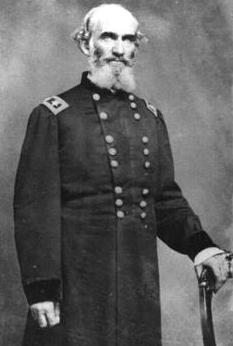
A. J. Smith

Banks ordered the army's retreat to begin at once. When the Federal soldiers began to reload the river transports, they were angry to find the vessels were filled with bales of cotton. Brigadier General James W. McMillan ordered the men to throw the cotton overboard, which was done. Pro-Union Louisianans queued up to get aboard the transports, but they were refused admittance. Wanting to hide his intentions, Banks issued orders to prevent Union soldiers from committing acts of arson and pillage, but failed to assign enough troops to ensure his orders were carried out. A. J. Smith and his high-ranking officers talked openly about putting Alexandria to the torch. Soon, Union soldiers and escaped Black slaves set plantations and farms around the town on fire. In one case, Confederate soldiers sacked and burned down the plantation of James Madison Wells, whom they regarded as a traitor.

Brigadier General Michael Kelly Lawler's XIII Corps troops led the march out of Alexandria, followed by Brigadier General William H. Emory's XIX Corps, with A. J. Smith's troops bringing up the rear. The Union army followed a road along the west bank of the river in order to protect the gunboats and river transports. The Confederates of Polignac, Major, and Bagby only skirmished with the Union cavalry, as it led Banks' march. Steele followed behind the withdrawing Federals, while the forces of Colonels Isaac F. Harrison and James B. Likens (3rd Louisiana Cavalry and 35th Texas Cavalry) moved along the east bank. As the last formations of Banks' army pulled out, parties of Federals went about town looting and setting fires. In all likelihood, the men of XVI and XVII Corps were mostly responsible for the orgy of destruction that followed. A. J. Smith galloped through Alexandria shouting, "Hurrah, boys, this looks like war!" Some men of the XIX Corps tried to put out the flames but were only able to save a few buildings. The next action was the Battle of Mansura on May 16.
