= Wood National Cemetery =

Veterans cemetery in Milwaukee County, Wisconsin

Coordinates: 43°01′40″N 87°58′50″W

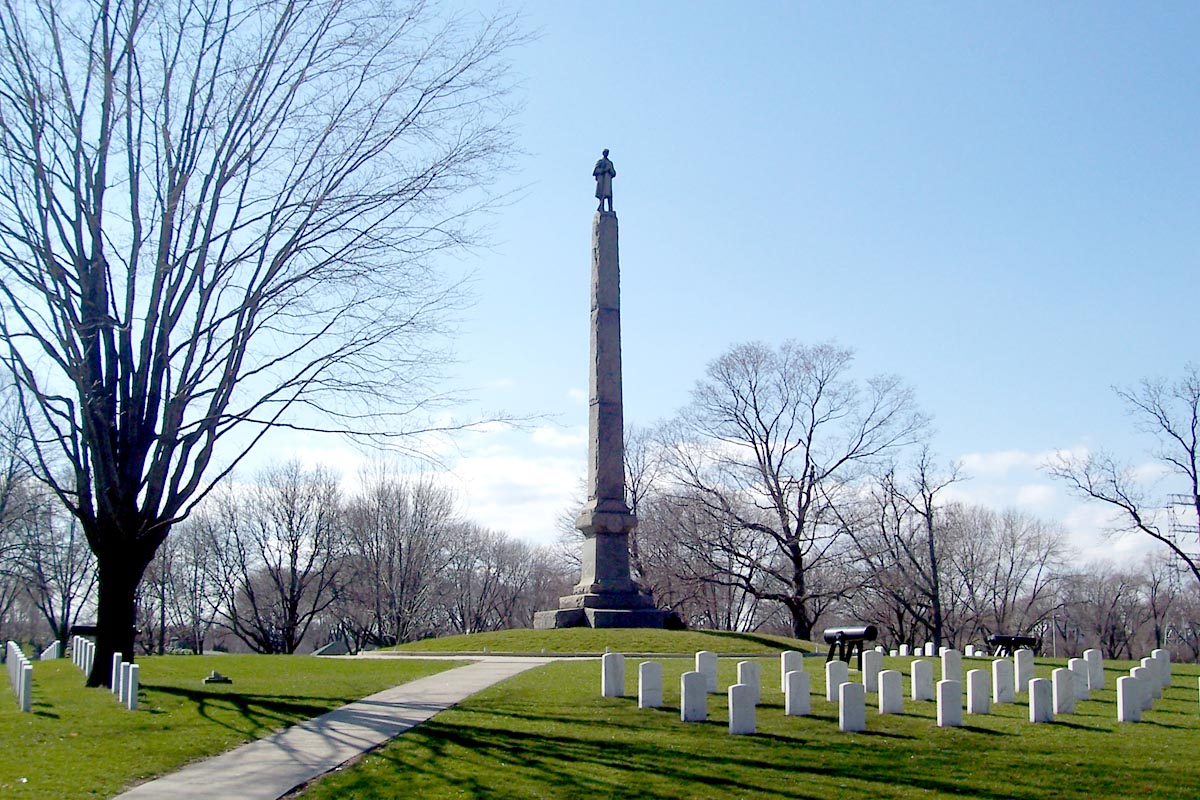
- Soldiers' and Sailors' Monument
- Interactive map of Wood National Cemetery

Details
- Location: Milwaukee, Wisconsin
- Type: United States National Cemetery
- Size: 50.1 acres (20.3 ha)
- No. of graves: Over 40,000

Wood National Cemetery is a United States National Cemetery located in Milwaukee, Wisconsin. It is one of two National Cemeteries in Wisconsin. It encompasses 50.1 acres (20.3 ha), and as of 2021, it had over 40,000 interments. Outside family members with existing plots and subsequent internments, the cemetery is closed to new interments.

== History ==
A part of the Milwaukee Soldiers Home campus (now the Clement J. Zablocki Veterans Association Medical Center), the cemetery was established in 1871 as Soldier Home Cemetery to inter the remains of soldiers who died while under care in its hospital. In 1937, it was renamed Wood Cemetery in honor of General George Wood, a long-time member of the Board of Managers for the center. The cemetery was then bisected by Interstate 94 in the early 1960s, requiring grave relocation and any plans for expanding the freeway in the future to carefully protect the cemetery's footprint.

Wood Cemetery became a National Cemetery in 1973 and is currently operated by the United States Department of Veterans Affairs. It was the only National Cemetery in Wisconsin until 2015, when Northwoods National Cemetery was established near Rhinelander. The cemetery

== Notable monuments ==
- Civil War Soldiers and Sailors monument, a 60' high granite monument erected in 1903.

== Notable interments ==
- Steward's Mate Herbert Lewis Hardwick- boxer
- Ordinary Seaman James K. L. Duncan, Medal of Honor recipient for service aboard USS Fort Hindman during the Civil War.
- Private Milton Matthews, Medal of Honor recipient for action in the Third Battle of Petersburg during the Civil War.
- Boatswain's Mate Michael McCormick, Medal of Honor recipient for service aboard USS Signal in the Red River Campaign during the Civil War.
- Corporal Winthrop D. Putnam, Medal of Honor recipient for action in the Battle of Vicksburg during the Civil War.
- Private Lewis A. Rounds, Medal of Honor recipient for action in the Battle of Spotsylvania Court House during the Civil War.
- Specialist 3rd Class Bob Uecker, baseball player, actor and broadcaster associated with the Milwaukee Brewers.
