= Action of 26–27 April 1864 =

1864 battle of the American Civil War

Action of April 26–27, 1864
- Part of the American Civil War
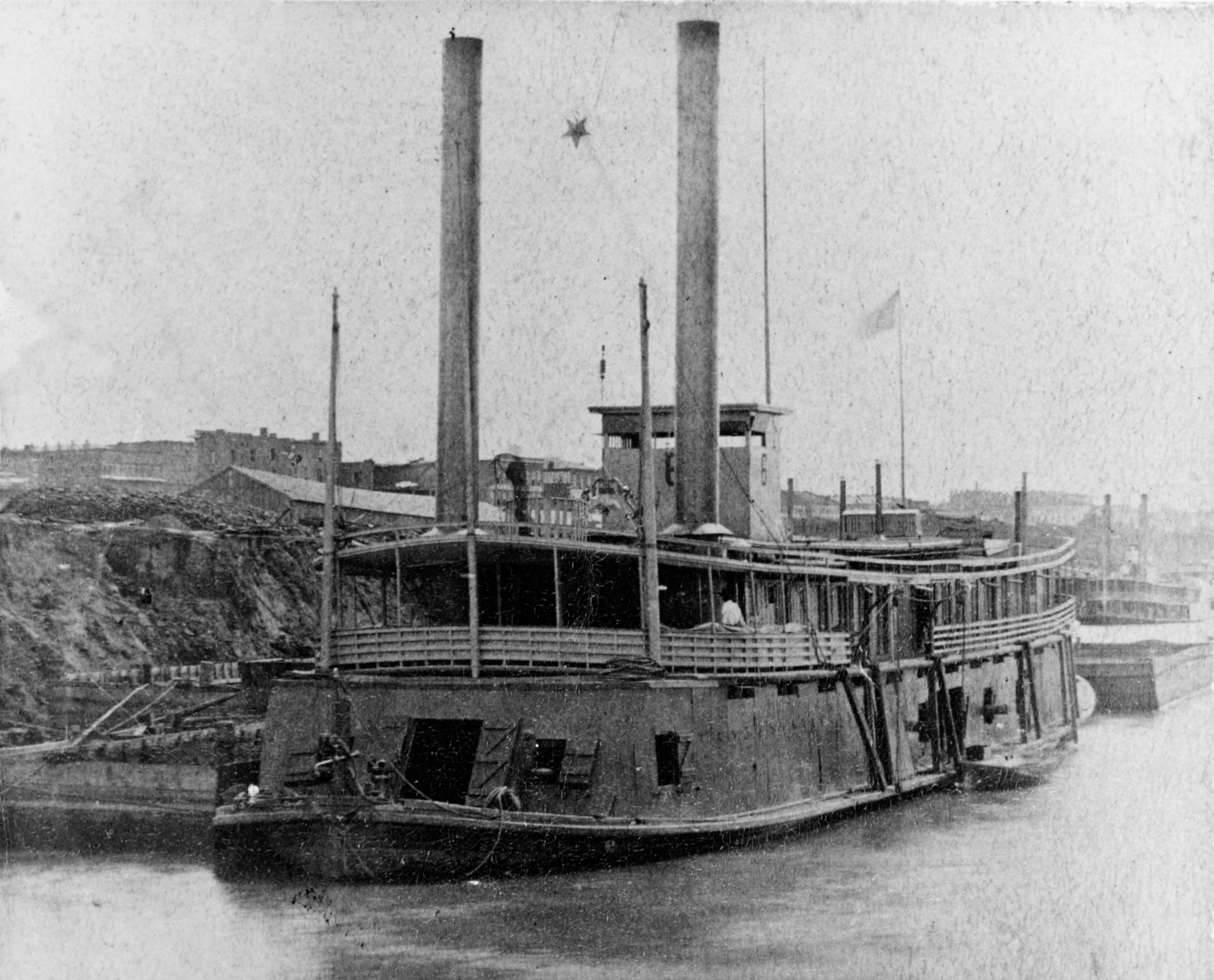
- The USS Cricket with Rear Admiral Porter aboard was seriously damaged in the action.
Date	April 26–27, 1864
Location	Confluence of the Cane River and the Red River 31°30′57″N 92°43′20″W
Result	Confederate victory

Belligerents
Confederate States	United States (Union)

Commanders and leaders
John H. Caudle; Florian Cornay †	David Dixon Porter

Units involved
Deptartment of West Louisiana	Mississippi River Squadron

Strength
200 men, 4 guns	4 gunboats, 2 pump boats

Casualties and losses
1 killed, 1 wounded	1 ironclad scuttled 2 pump boats lost 3 gunboats damaged Over 200 killed
- Location in Louisiana

The Action of April 26–27, 1864 saw a Confederate States Army force led by Lieutenant Colonel John H. Caudle and Captain Florian Cornay ambush several Union Navy warships and auxiliary vessels commanded by Rear Admiral David Dixon Porter as they made their way downstream on the Red River of the South. Eleven days earlier, a Confederate naval mine sank a Union ironclad warship. The vessel was refloated and escorted downstream by Porter with five Union vessels, but on April 26 the ironclad had to be scuttled.

The clash occurred as a Union Army under Major General Nathaniel P. Banks and naval forces under Porter were retreating from Grand Ecore near Natchitoches to Alexandria, Louisiana. In the ambush on April 26, Confederate artillery and foot soldiers seriously damaged three Union gunboats and two pump boats. The gunboats eventually escaped downstream, but both pump boats were captured, with serious loss of life. This action occurred at the place where the Cane River flowed into the Red River and was part of the Red River campaign in the American Civil War.

== Background ==
=== Red River campaign ===
President Abraham Lincoln wanted the United States flag raised over part of Texas to discourage the French-backed regime of Emperor Maximilian in Mexico. To further this goal, Major General Henry Halleck ordered Banks to invade Texas using the Red River corridor. The final plan called for Banks to move up Bayou Teche with 17,000 troops to join with Major General Andrew Jackson Smith with 10,000 men and Porter's gunboats advancing up the Red River. Major General Frederick Steele was instructed to move south from Little Rock, Arkansas, and join Banks and Porter, but Steele started late and never reached Banks.

On March 18, 1864 A. J. Smith's column occupied Alexandria and was joined by Banks' column a few days later. Despite unseasonably low water in the Red River, Banks ordered an advance on Shreveport, Louisiana, and on April 2 his army captured Natchitoches. On April 8 at the Battle of Mansfield, Taylor routed Banks and compelled the Union army to fall back. On April 9 Taylor's assault was repulsed at the Battle of Pleasant Hill, but Banks chose to withdraw to Grand Ecore near Natchitoches. At this time, Taylor's superior officer, General Edmund Kirby Smith ordered away most of the Confederate infantry to fight against Steele. This left Taylor with only 5,200 troops. On April 21, Banks abandoned the campaign and retreated from Grand Ecore. This decision was influenced by an order to return A. J. Smith's troops to Major General William T. Sherman by April 10. At the Battle of Monett's Ferry on April 23, the Union army broke through a trap set by Taylor and reached Alexandria.

== Loss of Eastport ==
At the end of March 1864, river pilot Wellington W. Withenbury advised Porter not to take the largest ironclad warship, the USS Eastport above the falls at Alexandria. Porter ignored this wise counsel and the Union Navy later paid a serious price for it. Porter's gunboats and a Union infantry division under Brigadier General Thomas Kilby Smith reached upstream as far as Loggy Bayou on April 10. On that day, Porter and T. K. Smith received news of the Mansfield fiasco and began withdrawing downstream. At the Battle of Blair's Landing on April 12, the expedition fought its way through a Confederate ambush with losses of 2 killed and 19 wounded, plus many gunboats damaged. By April 15, Porter's and T. K. Smith's expedition rejoined Banks' army at Grand Ecore.

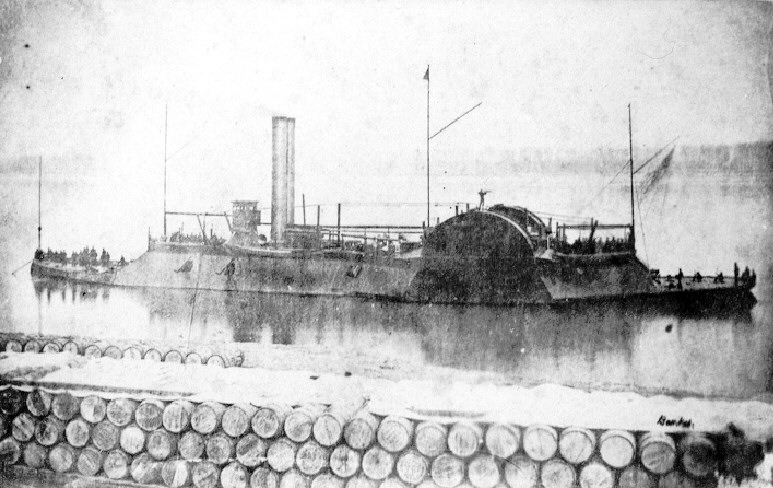
USS Eastport

On April 14 Porter, worried about the falling water level in the Red River, ordered the Eastport to head downstream from Grand Ecore. The vessel almost immediately went aground. The next day, the ironclad freed itself, proceeded 8 mi (13 km), struck a Confederate mine, and sank in shallow water. Porter sent two pump boats, the Champion No. 3 and the Champion No. 5 to assist. The Eastport was refloated and on April 21, it headed downstream again accompanied by Porter in the tinclad gunboat USS Cricket, which towed the ironclad's guns in a flatboat. Towed by the Champion No. 5, the Eastport grounded again that evening and it took a full day to free her. The ironclad made glacial progress over the next four days. On April 26, the Eastport became irreversibly grounded on a log jam near Montgomery, 50 mi (80 km) downstream from Grand Ecore.

The ironclad was blown up, and debris from the premature explosion narrowly missed Porter and the vessel's master, Lieutenant Commander Seth Ledyard Phelps. During the scuttling operation, Confederates tried to attack the Cricket but were driven off. Taylor reported that casualties were inflicted on the Union working parties, while the Confederates lost 2 killed and 4 wounded. The attackers belonged to units led by Colonels James B. Likens and Isaac F. Harrison. These were 35th (Likens') Texas Cavalry Regiment and the 3rd Louisiana Cavalry Regiment, respectively.

== Ambush ==
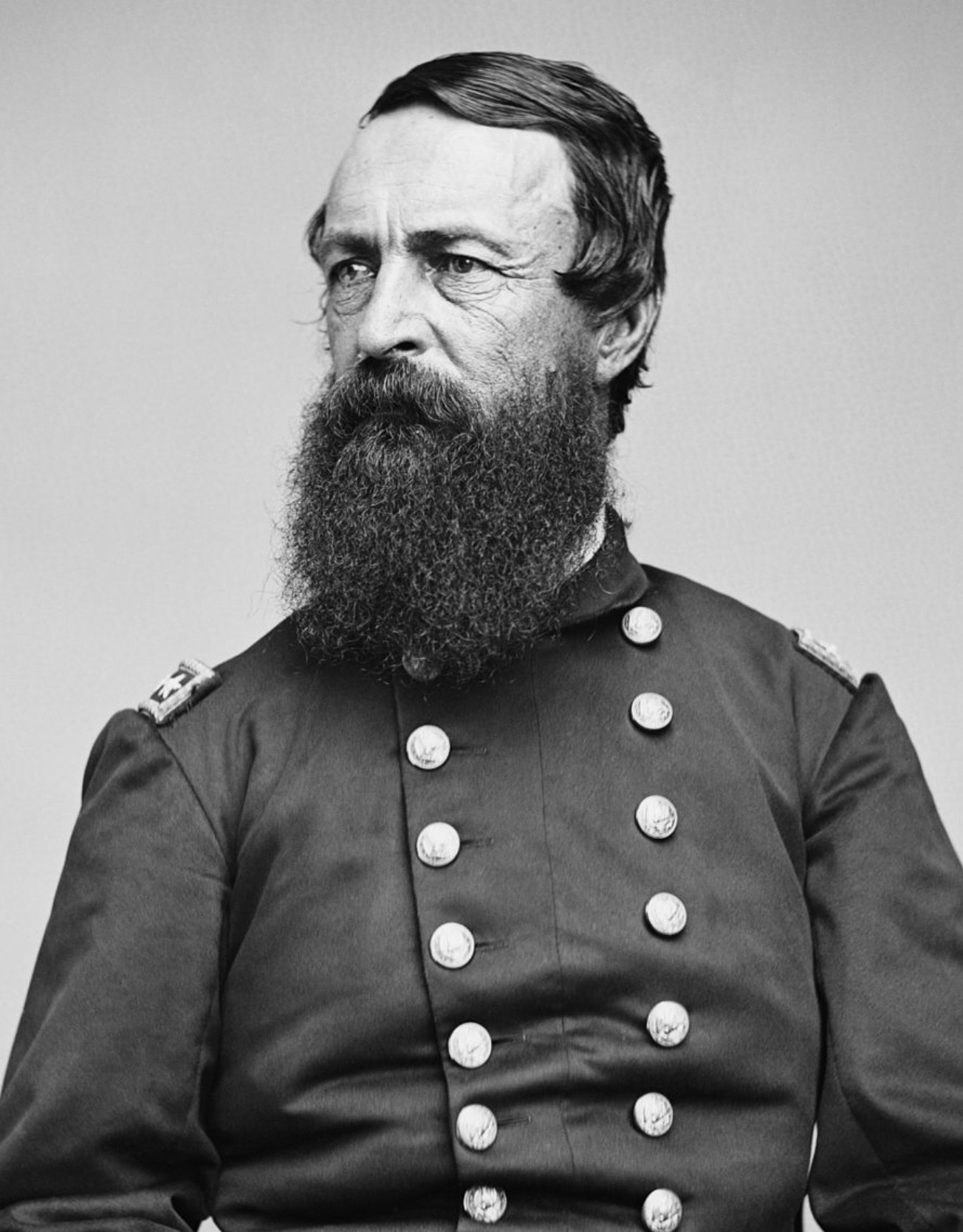
David D. Porter

Meanwhile Banks' army trailed into Alexandria between April 24 and 26. With Banks' army and most of the river fleet ahead of him at Alexandria, it was imperative for Porter to get his last few vessels to safety. Leaving the wreck of the Eastport behind them, the Cricket, the tinclad USS Juliet, the gunboat USS Fort Hindman, and the two pump boats proceeded 20 mi (32 km) downstream without incident. However, on April 26 at the confluence of the Red and Cane Rivers, Porter's gunboats ran into a Confederate ambush consisting of 200 men from Lieutenant Colonel John H. Caudle's 34th Texas Cavalry Regiment, dismounted as infantry, and Captain Florian Cornay's Louisiana Battery (two 12-pounder Napoleons and two 12-pounder howitzers).

The Cricket was hit 38 times by artillery rounds and lost 12 killed and 19 wounded. After the Cricket lost headway, the Confederate gunners shifted fire to other targets. Porter was able to get the vessel moving again and it managed to limp downstream. The 190 men aboard the Champion No. 3, mostly African-American refugees, suffered a ghastly fate. A Confederate shot penetrated the boiler, engulfing the vessel in scalding steam; by the next day, all but 3 men died from their injuries. The vessel drifted into the riverbank to be seized by the Confederates. Next, the Juliet was disabled, but it managed to escape upstream, towed by the Champion No. 5, while the Fort Hindman provided covering fire. Taylor reported only 1 wounded and Captain Cornay killed.

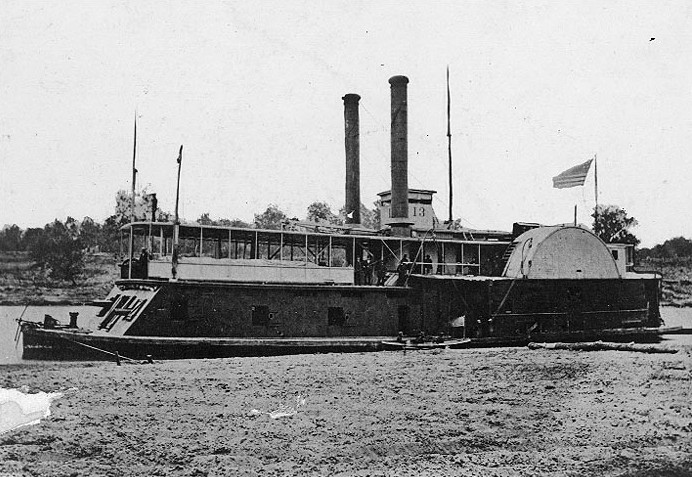
USS Fort Hindman

On April 27, the Juliet and Fort Hindman, lashed together, tried to run past the battery. They were both hit repeatedly, disabled, and separated, but by good luck, the current carried them downstream past the battery without grounding. Meanwhile, the Champion No. 5 was badly damaged and captured. The crew of the Juliet lost 15 killed and wounded while the Fort Hindman sustained 7 casualties. Also on April 27, Porter in the Cricket found the gunboat USS Lexington and the monitor USS Osage downstream near Deloach's Bluff. The two vessels had engaged sections of Captain T. D. Nettles' Val Verde Texas Battery and Captain Thomas O. Benton's Louisiana Battery. The Osage escorted the crippled Juliet and Fort Hindman while the Lexington escorted the Cricket safely to Alexandria.

== Aftermath ==
At Alexandria there was only 3.25 ft (1.0 m) water depth at the double falls, while the gunboats required a depth of 7 ft (2.1 m). The river channel between the falls was only 30 ft (9.1 m) wide in some places. The Cricket managed to get over the falls into deeper water, but the USS Carondelet, USS Chillicothe, USS Louisville, USS Mound City, USS Neosho, USS Osage, USS Ozark, and USS Pittsburgh, as well as the Fort Hindman and Lexington were trapped. The subsequent actions near Alexandria would determine the fate of Porter's gunboats.
