= Charles Asten =

Canadian-born US Navy gunner

- Born: Michael Charles Asten; September 14, 1834; Halifax, Nova Scotia
- Died: September 14, 1885 (aged 51); Halifax, Nova Scotia
- Military career
- Allegiance: United States
- Branch: United States Navy
- Rank: Quarter Gunner
- Unit: USS Signal
- Conflicts: American Civil War: Red River Campaign
- Awards: Medal of Honor

Charles Asten (born Michael Charles Asten, but served under his middle name) (September 14, 1834 – September 14, 1885) was a Quarter Gunner in the United States Navy during the American Civil War. Asten was born in Halifax, Nova Scotia, in September 1834, and he entered the United States Navy in Chicago, Illinois, during the Civil War. In 1864, he served aboard USS Signal, a U.S. tinclad, during the Red River Campaign.

== Signal incident ==
On May 4, 1864, USS Signal was ordered to proceed up the Red River with a bearer of dispatches from Major General Nathaniel Prentice Banks, the commander of the Union Red River Campaign forces. After traversing about 20 miles (32 km) on the river, USS Signal met Confederate forces, and the ensuing conflict, which also involved USS Covington and Army transport ship John Warner, continued into the night. On May 5, Signal was disabled and the crew, including Asten, reluctantly abandoned the ship; having surrendered, they were captured on land.

== Aftermath ==
Asten, who had, on May 5, carried out his duties despite being on the sick list, was awarded the Medal of Honor on December 31, 1864. George Butts, and six other fellow Signal crew members, also received Medals of Honor for their valor during the action.

Charles Asten died on September 14, 1885, in Nova Scotia. He was interred at Saint Francis Cemetery in Providence County, Rhode Island.

== Full citation ==
Aster's Medal of Honor citation reads as follows:

Served on board the U.S.S. Signal, Red River, 5 May 1864. Proceeding up the Red River, the U.S.S. Signal engaged a large force of enemy field batteries and sharpshooters, returning their fire until the Federal ship was totally disabled, at which time the white flag was raised. Although on the sick list, Q.G. Asten courageously carried out his duties during the entire engagement.

== See also ==
- List of American Civil War Medal of Honor recipients
