= 1st Louisiana Field Battery =

1st Louisiana Field Battery St. Mary's Cannoneers
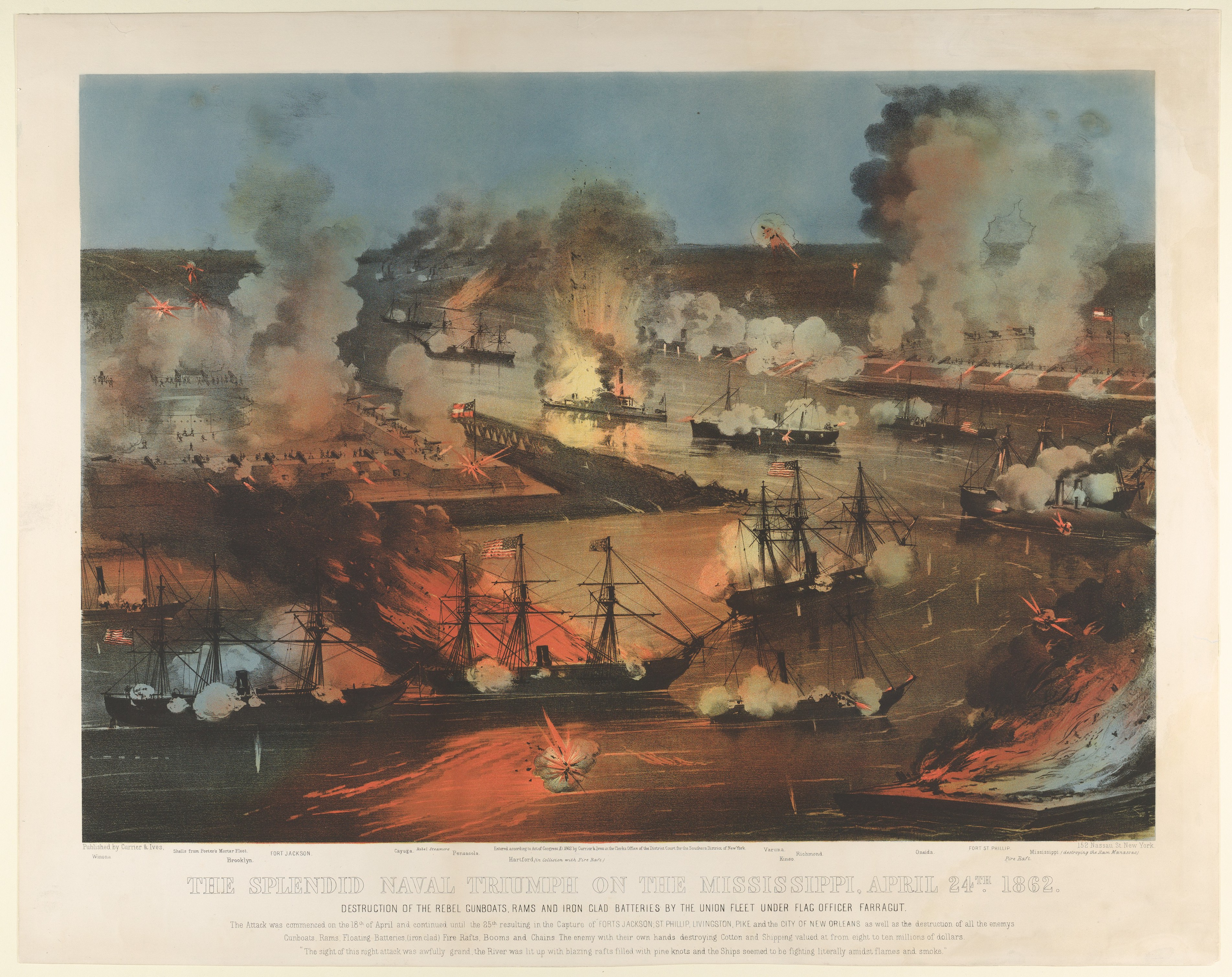
- The battery's first action was defending Fort Jackson, shown at left, against the U.S. Navy.
- Active: 7 October 1861 – 26 May 1865
- Country: Confederate States of America
- Allegiance: Confederate States of America; Louisiana
- Branch: Confederate States Army
- Type: Artillery
- Size: Company
- Equipment: 2 × M1841 12-pounder howitzers, 2 × 12-pounder Napoleons (May 1864)
- Engagements: American Civil War; Battle of Forts Jackson and St. Philip (1862); Battle of Fort Bisland (1863); Battle of Irish Bend (1863); Engaged USS Estrella (1863); Engaged USS Neosho (1863); Battle of Mansfield (1864); Action of 26–27 April 1864; Battle of Mansura (1864); Battle of Yellow Bayou (1864)

Commanders
- Notable commanders: Florian O. Cornay †; Minos T. Gordy

The 1st Louisiana Field Battery was an artillery unit recruited from volunteers in Louisiana that fought in the Confederate States Army during the American Civil War. The battery mustered into Confederate service in October 1861. The unit traveled to Fort Jackson in early 1862 and took part in the defense of Forts Jackson and St. Philip. The soldiers became prisoners when the forts surrendered and the battery reformed at Franklin after their prisoner exchange. The battery fought at Fort Bisland and Irish Bend in 1863. Later in the year the battery engaged Union shipping on the rivers in several actions. In 1864 the battery briefly fought at Mansfield before its commander was killed while engaging Union gunboats in late April. The unit also fought at Mansura and Yellow Bayou. The battery was in Texas when the Trans-Mississippi Department surrendered in May 1865.

== Service ==
=== Fort Jackson ===
The St. Mary's Cannoneers battery was accepted into Confederate service on 7 October 1861 at Franklin, Louisiana, with Florian O. Cornay as captain. Early in 1862, the battery moved from Camp Hunter near Franklin to Fort Jackson and fought in the Battle of Forts Jackson and St. Philip. A detachment of the St. Mary's Cannoneers led by First Lieutenant George O. Foot along with B and D Companies of the 1st Louisiana Heavy Artillery were assigned to man the Fort Jackson water battery. This consisted of two rifled 32-pounder guns, three 32-pounder smoothbore guns, one 10-inch Columbiad, one 9-inch Columbiad, and one 10-inch mortar. The Union fleet began a mortar bombardment of Fort Jackson on 18 April 1862, and it continued for several days. The warships of the Union fleet began moving up the Mississippi River at 3:30 am on 24 April and despite heavy fire, successfully passed the forts. On the night of 27 April, the isolated garrison of Fort Jackson mutinied, compelling the commanding officer to surrender the forts. St. Mary's Cannoneers battery did not participate in the mutiny; nevertheless, its soldiers became prisoners of war.

=== 1863 ===
The captured officers and men were released in a prisoner exchange. The St. Mary's Cannoneers reassembled at Camp Hunter and were equipped as a field battery. One section of the battery fought at the Battle of Fort Bisland on 12–13 April 1863. Union Major General Nathaniel P. Banks concentrated two and a half infantry divisions at Brashear City on 9 April, and began advancing up the Atchafalaya River and Bayou Teche. Fighting occurred on the east and west banks of Bayou Teche. One section of St. Mary's Cannoneers was posted on the west bank with the 28th Louisiana Infantry Regiment in support. There was also a 24-pounder siege gun on the west bank, manned by gunners from Cornay's battery. One gun was disabled and had to be abandoned. The other two sections of the battery fought at the Battle of Irish Bend on 14 April. In this action, the 13th Connecticut Infantry Regiment captured the battery's flag.

Banks moved north and captured Alexandria on 7 May. However, news of Major General Ulysses S. Grant's Vicksburg campaign caused Banks to quit the west side of the Mississippi River on 23 May and start operations against Port Hudson. On 3 June 1863, the St. Mary's Cannoneers fought with the Union gunboat USS Estrella on the Atchafalaya and forced it to retreat. On 7–10 July, Cornay's battery fired on Union riverboats in the Mississippi near Donaldsonville. From July 1863 to March 1864, the battery joined Brigadier General Alfred Mouton's brigade in its operations in south Louisiana, but there was little fighting. On 18–21 November, part of the battery harassed Federal shipping at Red River Landing. On 8 December, one section of the St. Mary's Cannoneers damaged the river transport Von Phul and clashed with the monitor USS Neosho.

=== 1864–1865 ===
In the Red River campaign, Banks thrust up the Red River toward Texas with 32,000 troops accompanied by a Union fleet led by Rear Admiral David Dixon Porter. At the Battle of Mansfield on 8 April 1864, Cornay's battery was placed in the front line between the divisions of Mouton and Major General John George Walker. It fired briefly in support of the initial Confederate assault. Banks abandoned the campaign after his defeat at Mansfield. As Porter's Union fleet retreated down the Red River, it was harassed by Confederate riflemen and artillery from the riverbank. In the Action of 26–27 April 1864, Cornay's guns hit the gunboat USS Cricket (with Porter aboard) 38 times, killing 12 crewmen and wounding 19. The pump-boat Champion No. 3 was struck in the boiler, releasing steam that scalded almost all of her crew to death. However, the Cricket managed to escape. On the second day, the pump-boat Champion No. 5 tried to run past the battery, but it was disabled and captured. The gunboat USS Fort Hindman successfully ran the battery with 7 casualties and so did the USS Juliet with 15 casualties. Cornay was killed during the 26 April fighting; he was eventually replaced as captain by Minos T. Gordy.

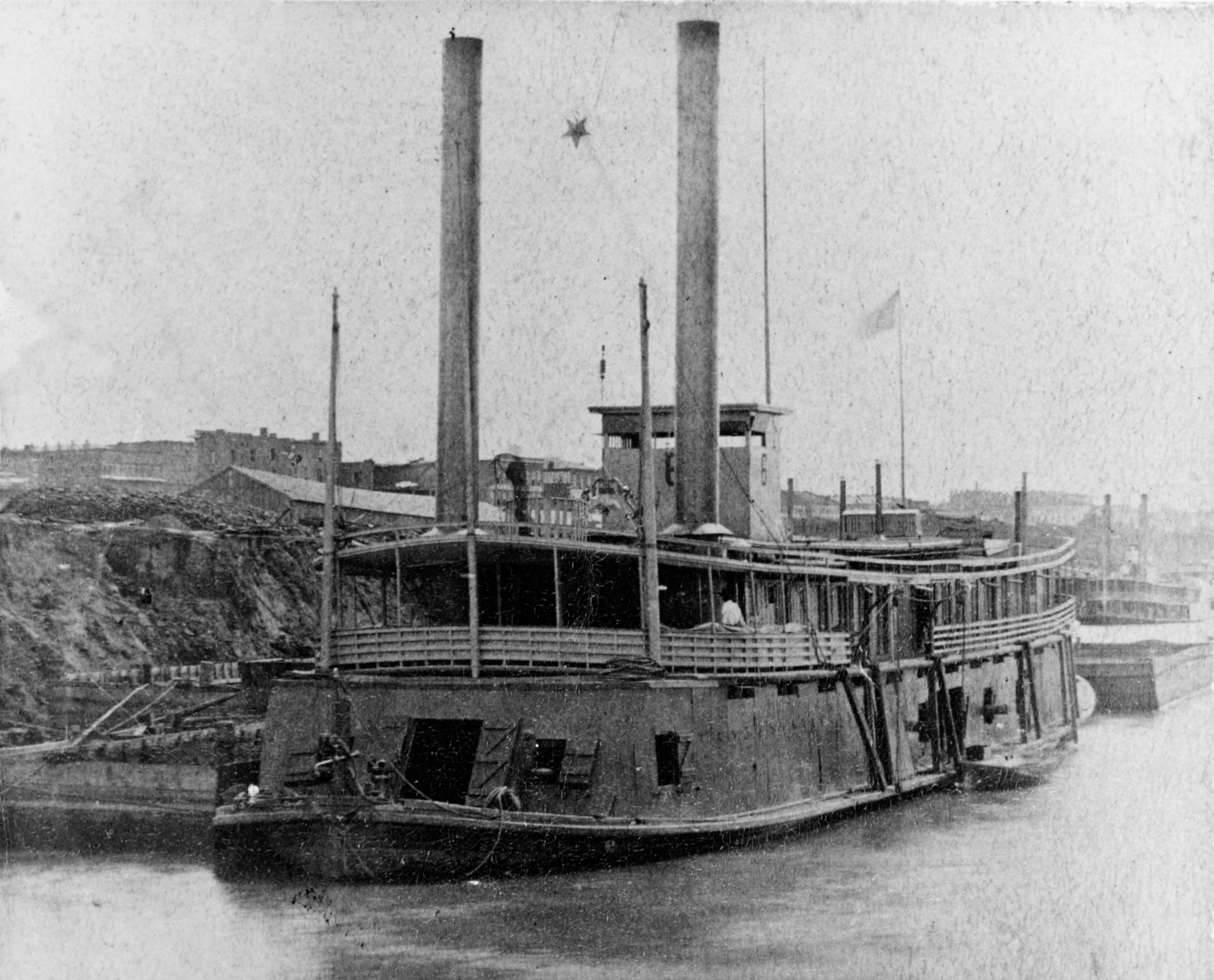
The USS Cricket was hit 38 times by the battery.

At the Battle of Mansura on 15 May 1864, Cornay's battery was under the command of First Lieutenant John B. Tarleton. Its armament consisted of two 12-pounder Napoleons and two 12-pounder howitzers. The battery arrived on the field while covered by Colonel Xavier Debray's Texas cavalry brigade and began firing at 7:30 am. The horsemen then withdrew, to be replaced by skirmishers from the 28th Louisiana Infantry Regiment. The battery was placed to the right, while the 1st Louisiana Regular Battery under Captain J. T. M. Barnes was to the left and Lieutenant Maunsel Bennett's 2nd Louisiana Field Battery was farther back. At about 10:00 am, the two howitzers under Lieutenant Oscar D. Berwick were shifted to the extreme left flank in order to engage a force of Union troops that were massing in that direction. After continuous action, the battery was ordered to withdraw at 10:30 am; the howitzers were last to leave the battlefield. The battery lost 2 enlisted men wounded. At the Battle of Yellow Bayou on May 18, the battery was positioned on the left flank. The battery opened fire at 3:00 pm and ceased fire at sunset. At Yellow Bayou, the battery's two Napoleons fired 37 solid shot, 22 common shell, and 40 spherical case while the two howitzers fired 60 common shell and 36 spherical case.

Yellow Bayou was the battery's last action in the war. While assigned to Brigadier General Camille de Polignac's division, it marched through north Louisiana and south Arkansas later in the year. The unit received the name 1st Louisiana Field Battery in November 1864. The battery was attached to Major General John Horace Forney's Texas infantry division. At the end of the war, the battery was camped near Tyler, Texas. The official surrender date of the Trans-Mississippi Department was 26 May 1865. Altogether, 161 men served in the 1st Louisiana Field Battery during the conflict.

== See also ==
- List of Louisiana Confederate Civil War units
- Louisiana in the Civil War
