= USS Ouachita =

Gunboat of the United States Navy

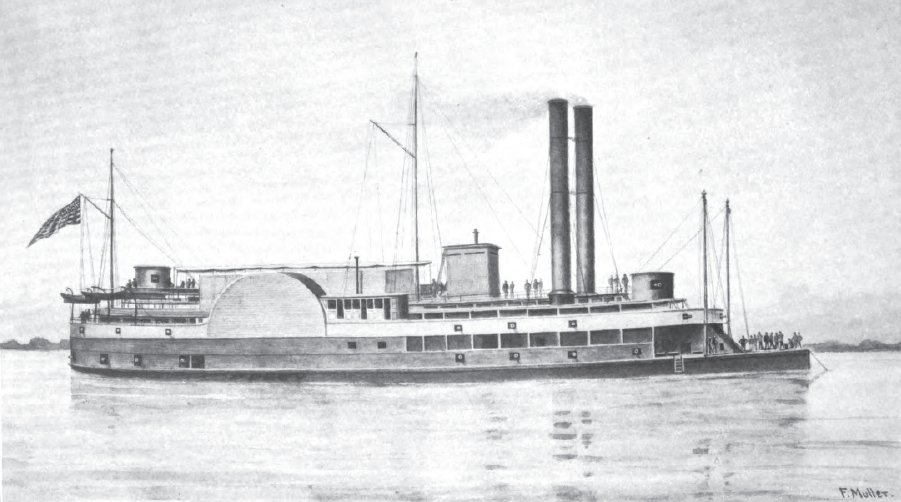
- USS Ouachita

History

United States
- Acquired: 29 September 1863
- Commissioned: 18 January 1864
- Decommissioned: 3 July 1865
- Captured: 13 July 1863
- Fate: Sold, 25 September 1865

General characteristics
- Displacement: 720 tons
- Length: 227 ft 6 in (69.34 m)
- Beam: 38 ft (12 m)
- Draft: 7 ft (2.1 m)
- Depth of hold: 7 ft 6 in (2.29 m)
- Propulsion: steam engine; side-wheel propelled
- Armament: four 30-pounder Army Parrott rifles; one 30-pounder Navy Parrott rifles; eight 24-pounder guns; one 12 pounder rifled gun

USS Ouachita was a steamer captured by the Union Navy during the American Civil War. She was used by the Navy to patrol navigable waterways of the Confederacy to prevent the South from trading with other countries.

== Service history ==
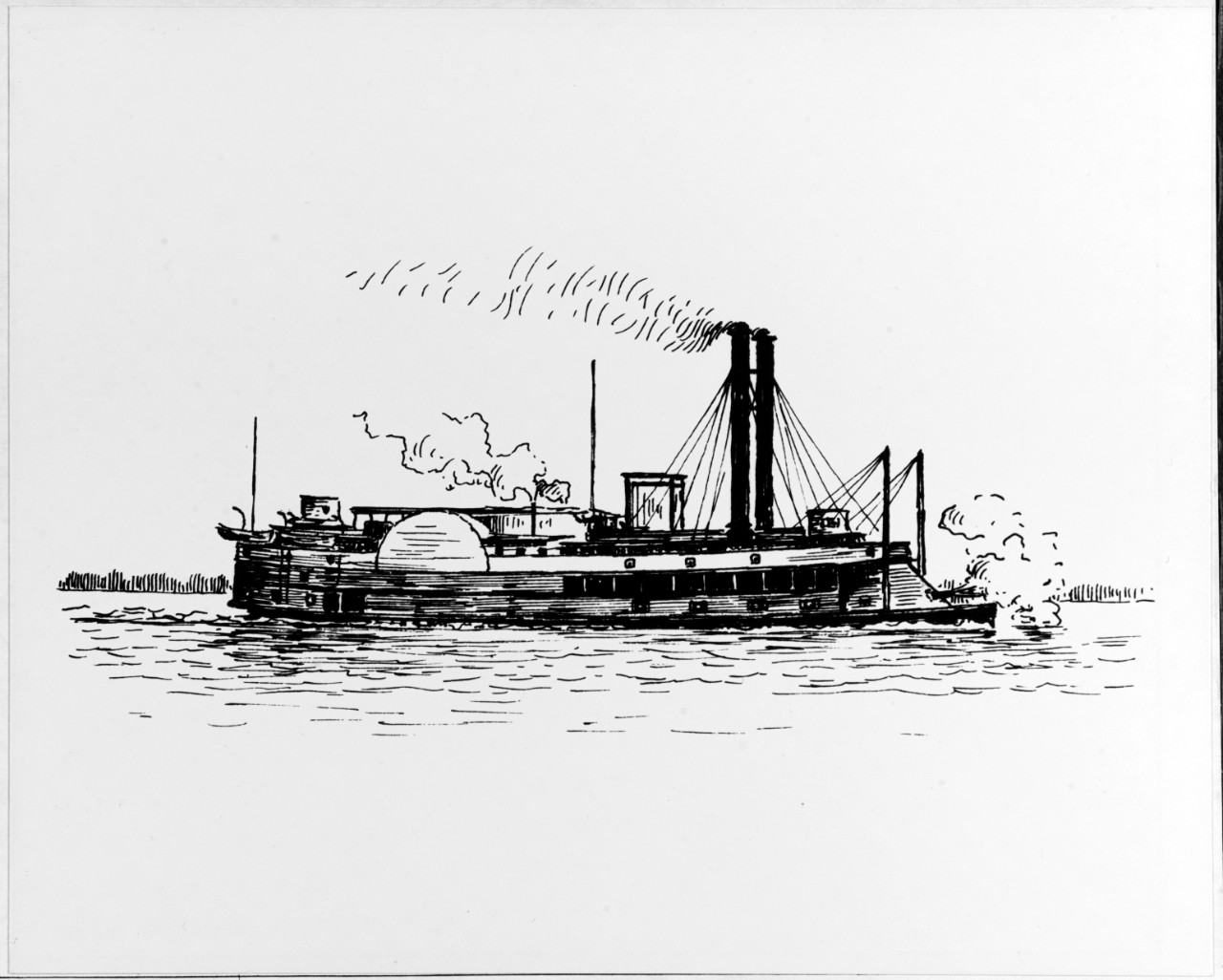
USS Ouachita, by Samuel War Stanton

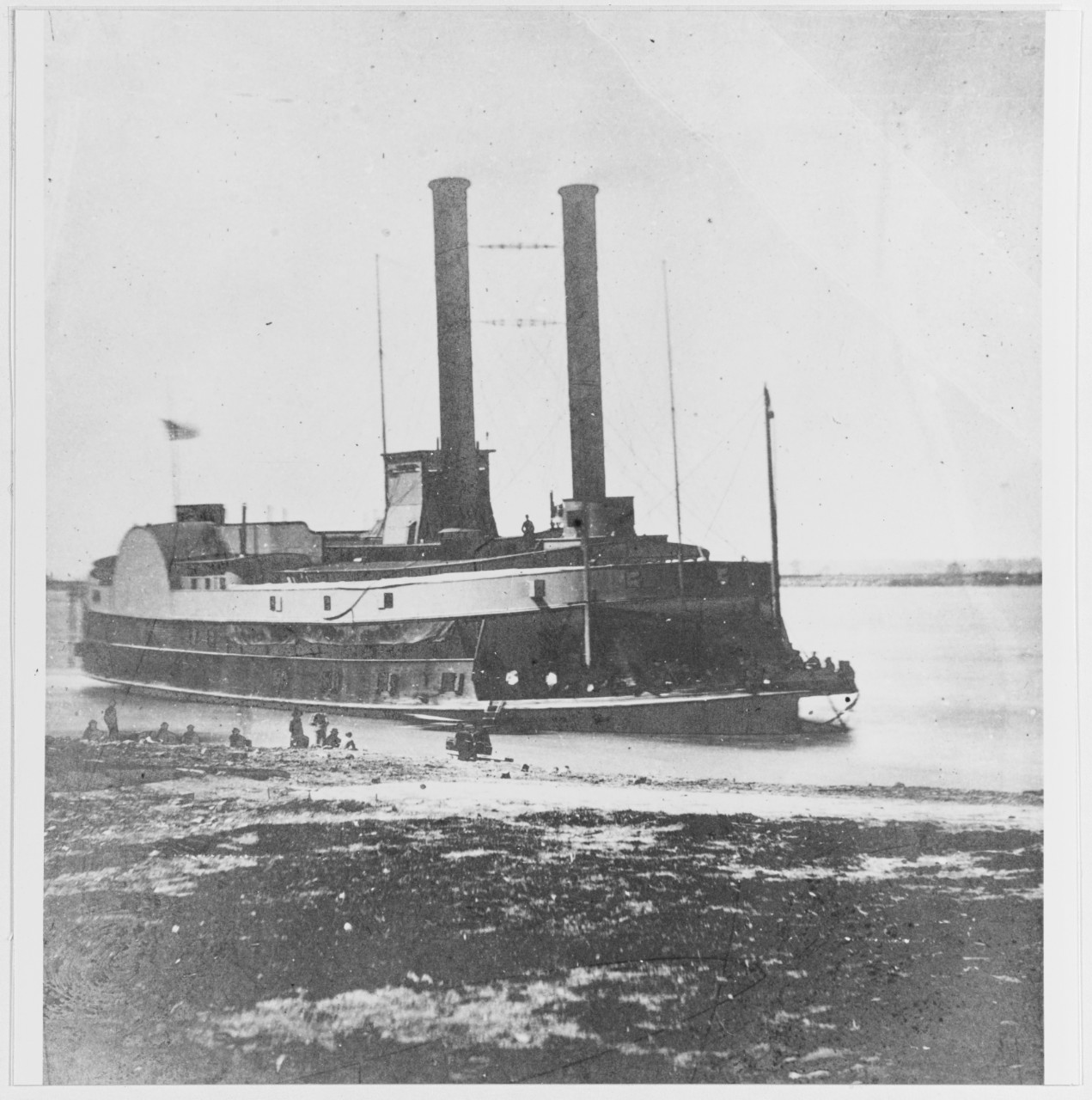
The tinclad Ouachita on the Western Rivers during the Civil War

Union gunboats USS Manitou and USS Rattler captured Confederate side wheel steamer Louisville in the Little Red River 13 July 1863. The Navy purchased the prize from the Prize Court at Cairo, Illinois, 29 September 1863, and commissioned her as Ouachita 18 January 1864. Lt. Comdr. Byron Wilson assumed command 1 February. During the remainder of the Civil War, the gunboat operated in the Mississippi River and its tributaries, especially the Red, Black, and Ouachita Rivers. She participated in Rear Admiral David Dixon Porter’s expedition up the Red River to Alexandria 12 March to 22 May 1864. She performed patrol duty through the end of the war, and again ascended the Red River in May and June 1865 to receive the surrender of Confederate forces. Decommissioned 3 July 1865, Ouachita was sold at auction at Mound City, Illinois, 25 September 1865 to Tait, Able, and Gill.

== See also ==
- Anaconda Plan
- Mississippi Squadron
