= Hugh Molloy =

United States Navy Medal of Honor recipient

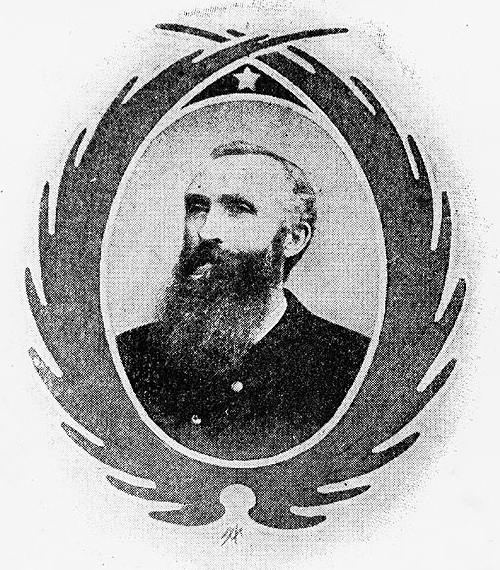
- Ordinary Seaman Hugh Molloy
- Born: September 25, 1841 (Note: Records are inconsistent on Molloy's place and year of birth. His Medal of Honor citation gives his birth as 1832 in Illinois, while the book Deeds of Valor gives his birth as September 25, 1841, in Comerford, Ireland, and Molloy's gravestone also gives his birth as September 25, 1841. This article assumes that the information in Deeds of Valor and on Molloy's gravestone is correct.); Comerford, Ireland
- Died: March 8, 1922 (aged 80); Illinois, U.S.
- Burial place: Calvary Cemetery, Evanston, Illinois, U.S.
- Military career
- Allegiance: United States of America
- Branch: United States Navy
- Service years: 1863–1864
- Rank: Ordinary Seaman
- Unit: USS Fort Hindman
- Conflicts: American Civil War
- Awards: Medal of Honor

Hugh Molloy (September 25, 1841 – March 8, 1922) was a United States Navy sailor and a recipient of America's highest military decoration, the Medal of Honor, for his actions in the American Civil War.

== Biography ==
During the Civil War, Molloy served as an Ordinary Seaman on USS Fort Hindman. He was awarded the Medal of Honor for his actions during an engagement with a Confederate artillery battery near Harrisonburg, Louisiana, on March 2, 1864.

Molloy died in March 1922 at age 80; he was buried in Calvary Cemetery in Evanston, Illinois.

== Medal of Honor citation ==

Rank and Organization:

Ordinary Seaman, U.S. Navy. Born: 1832, Illinois. Accredited to: Illinois. G.O. No.: 32, April 16, 1864.

Citation:

Served on board the U.S.S. Fort Hindman during the engagement near Harrisonburg, La., 2 March 1864. Following a shellburst which mortally wounded the first sponger, who dropped the sponge out of the forecastle port, Molloy jumped out of the port to the forecastle, recovered the sponge and sponged and loaded the gun for the remainder of the action from his exposed position, despite the extreme danger to his person from the raking fire of enemy musketry.

== See also ==
- List of American Civil War Medal of Honor recipients: M–P
- James K. L. Duncan, who also received the Medal of Honor for action during the same engagement as Molloy
