= Timothy O'Donoghue =

- Civil War era Navy Medal of Honor
- Born: 1844; Rochester, New York
- Died: July 20, 1877 (aged 32–33); Rochester, New York
- Burial place: Holy Sepulchre Cemetery (Rochester, New York)
- Military career
- Allegiance: United States
- Branch: United States Navy
- Service years: 1863 - 1865, 1867 - 1870
- Rank: Seaman
- Unit: (United States Navy) USS Signal
- Conflicts: American Civil War • Red River Campaign
- Awards: Medal of Honor

Timothy O'Donoghue (1844 - July 20, 1877) was a Union Navy sailor in the American Civil War and a recipient of the United States military's highest decoration, the Medal of Honor, for his actions during the Red River Campaign.

Born in 1844 in Rochester, New York, O'Donoghue joined the Navy in August 1863. He served as a seaman and boatswain's mate on the USS Signal. On May 5, 1864, during an engagement with Confederates on the Red River in Louisiana, Signal took heavy fire and was disabled. Although wounded early in the battle, O'Donoghue remained at his post as gun captain until being ordered to withdraw. For this action, he was awarded the Medal of Honor seven months later, on December 31, 1864. O'Donoghue left the Navy in March 1865, but served again from May 1867 until May 1870.

O'Donoghue's official Medal of Honor citation reads:

Served as boatswain's mate on board the U.S.S. Signal, Red River, 5 May 1864. Proceeding up the Red River, the U.S.S. Signal engaged a large force of enemy field batteries and sharpshooters, returning the fire until the ship was totally disabled, at which time the white flag was raised. Serving as gun captain, and wounded early in the battle, O'Donoghue bravely stood by his gun in the face of enemy fire until ordered to withdraw.
