= Charles Bradley (sailor) =

Irish sailor who fought in the American Civil War

- Born: c. 1838; Ireland
- Military career
- Allegiance: United States of America
- Branch: United States Navy
- Rank: Boatswain's Mate
- Unit: USS Louisville
- Conflicts: Battle of Fort Hindman
- Awards: Medal of Honor

Boatswain's Mate Charles Bradley (born c. 1838) was an Irish sailor who fought in the American Civil War. Bradley received the country's highest award for bravery during combat, the Medal of Honor, for his action aboard the USS Louisville and the Battle of Fort Hindman on January 10 and 11, 1863. He was honored with the award on 3 April 1863.

== Biography ==
Bradley was born in Ireland in about 1838. He enlisted in the Navy from New York, and was assigned to the USS Louisville.

== Medal of Honor ==
Carrying out his duties through the thick of battle and acting as captain of a 9-inch gun, Bradley consistently showed, "Attention to duty, bravery, and coolness in action against the enemy."

== See also ==
- List of American Civil War Medal of Honor recipients: A–F
