= John Hyland (Medal of Honor) =

American soldier (1819–1867)

John Hyland (1819 – August 10, 1867) was an American soldier and recipient of the Medal of Honor.

== Biography ==
Hyland was born in Ireland in 1819. He moved to America sometime between his birth and the start of the American Civil War. Hyland served as a Seaman and eventually Assistant Gunner in the U.S. Navy aboard the USS Signal. It was aboard that ship he earned his Medal of Honor on May 5, 1864, during the Red River Campaign. He died in Manistee, Michigan on August 10, 1867, and was buried there at Oak Grove Cemetery.

== Medal of Honor Citation ==
Served as seaman on board USS Signal which was attacked by field batteries and sharpshooters and destroyed in Red River, 5 May 1864.
