= James K. L. Duncan =

American Civil War sailor

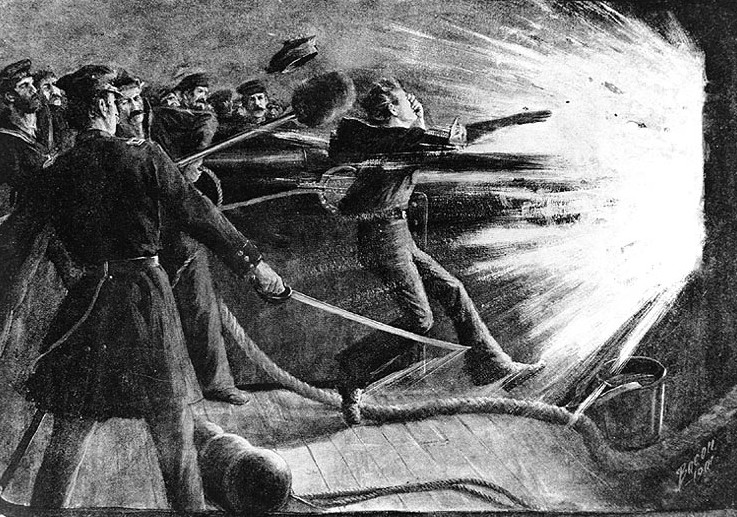
- An illustration of Duncan throwing a burning cartridge overboard on USS Fort Hindman
- Born: James Kelly Leeper Duncan; July 6, 1845; Washington County, Pennsylvania, U.S. (Note: Sources differ as to Duncan's place of birth: FamilySearch lists Washington, Pennsylvania (the county seat of Washington County); the Congressional Medal of Honor Society lists "Frankfort Mineral Springs, Washington County, PA" (there is a Frankfort Springs, Pennsylvania, but it is located in Beaver County); and the Naval History and Heritage Command lists "Frankfort, PA" (ambiguous).)
- Died: March 27, 1913 (aged 67); Milwaukee, Wisconsin, U.S.
- Burial place: Wood National Cemetery, Milwaukee
- Education: Monmouth College
- Military career
- Allegiance: United States of America
- Branch: United States Navy
- Service years: 1863–1864, 1865–1866
- Rank: Ordinary Seaman
- Unit: USS Fort Hindman
- Conflicts: American Civil War
- Awards: Medal of Honor
- Other work: Physician

Ordinary Seaman James Kelly Leeper Duncan (July 6, 1845 – March 27, 1913) was an American sailor who fought in the American Civil War. Duncan received the country's highest award for bravery during combat, the Medal of Honor, for his action aboard the USS Fort Hindman on March 2, 1864. He was honored with the award on December 31, 1864.

== Biography ==
Duncan was born in Washington County, Pennsylvania, on July 6, 1845. His parents were Jonathan F. Duncan and Agnes Harper Leeper. Duncan attended Monmouth College with the class of 1866 but did not return to college after leaving to join the Civil War fighting for the North.

Duncan enlisted into the Union Navy on June 26, 1863, in Chicago, Illinois. He was assigned to the tinclad steamer USS Fort Hindman at the time of his Medal of Honor action in March 1864. He was mustered out of service on July 8, 1864, in Red River, Louisiana. He reenlisted on March 4, 1865, and was discharged on July 13, 1866, in Pensacola, Florida.

Duncan married Lillian Jane Middlekauff (1860–1926) on November 4, 1879, in Des Moines, Iowa; (Note: Legal notices in the Nebraska City News-Press indicate that Duncan sued his wife for divorce on December 20, 1900.) they had at least 6 children. In civilian life, he had a career as a physician. He was admitted to the Northwestern Branch Soldiers Home on May 2, 1910. He died on March 27, 1913, and his remains are interred at the Wood National Cemetery in Milwaukee, Wisconsin.

== Medal of Honor citation ==
Served on board the U.S.S. Fort Hindman during the engagement near Harrisonburg, Louisiana, 2 March 1864. Following a shellburst at one of the guns which started a fire at the cartridge tie, Ordinary Seaman Duncan immediately seized the burning cartridge, took it from the gun and threw it overboard, despite the immediate danger to himself. Carrying out his duties through the entire engagement, Duncan served courageously during this action in which the Fort Hindman was raked severely with shot and shell from the enemy guns.

== See also ==
- List of American Civil War Medal of Honor recipients: A–F
- Hugh Molloy, who also received the Medal of Honor for action during the same engagement as Duncan
