= 99th United States Colored Infantry Regiment =

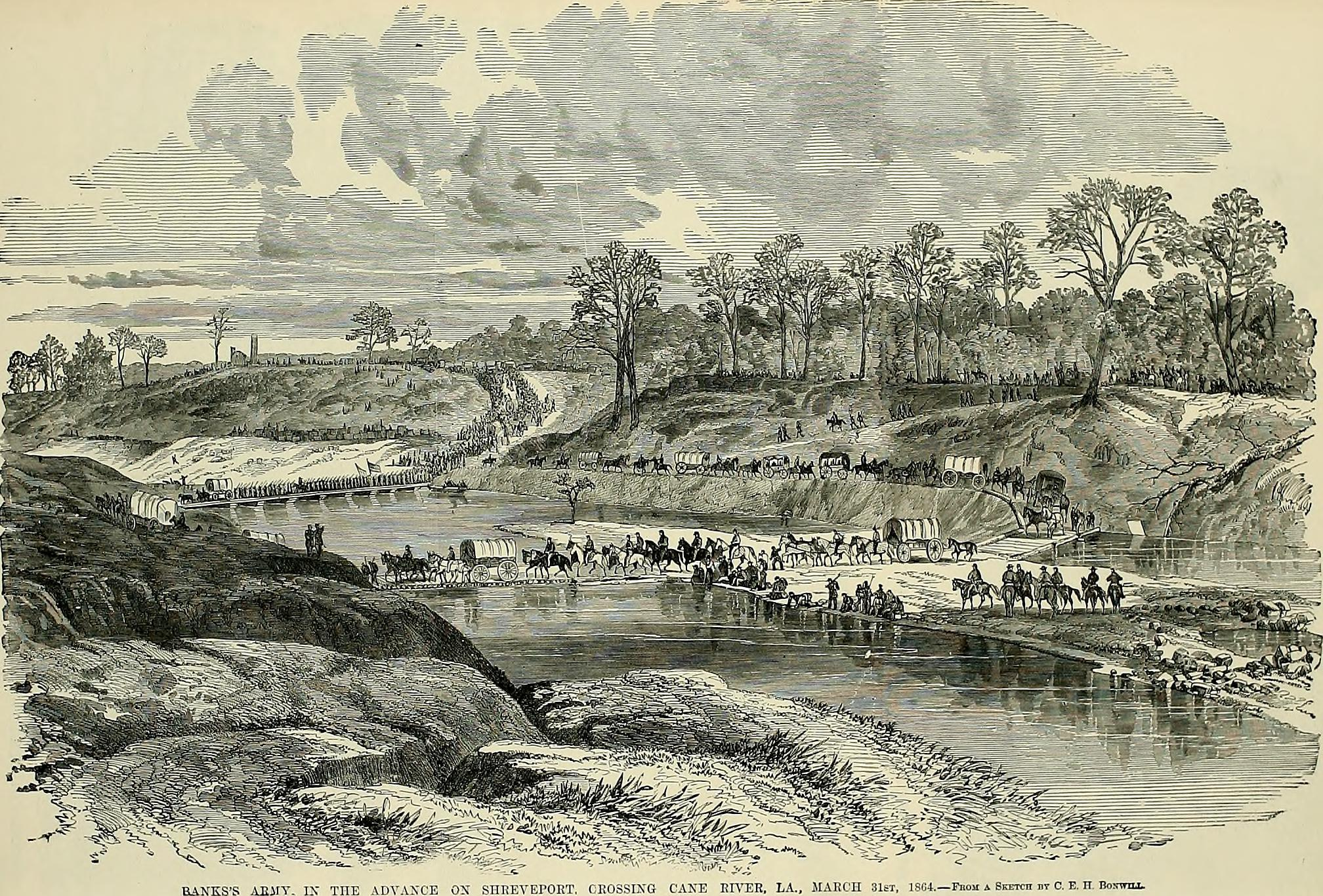
- The regiment built the bridges across the Cane River on 31 March 1864.
- Active: 10 February 1864 — 28 April 1866 (as 99th USCT)
- Country: United States
- Allegiance: (United States) Union Army
- Branch: Army
- Type: Infantry
- Size: Regiment
- Part of: Department of the Gulf
- Engagements: American Civil War; Red River campaign (1864); Actions near Alexandria (1864); Battle of Yellow Bayou (1864)

Commanders
- Notable commanders: Uri B. Pearsall

The 99th United States Colored Infantry was an infantry regiment of United States Colored Troops that served in the Union Army during the American Civil War and fought in the Western Theater of the American Civil War. On 10 February 1864, the regiment was created as the 5th Regiment of Engineers, Corps d'Afrique where all the rank and file were African-American. The unit garrisoned Brashear City, Louisiana and then took part in the Red River campaign as part of an engineer brigade. In mid-campaign, in April 1864 it was officially renamed the 99th Regiment. The regiment helped build Bailey's Dam during the actions near Alexandria. At the end of the campaign it skirmished at Yellow Bayou. After serving as part of the garrison of New Orleans, the unit was transferred to Florida where it served at St. Marks, Key West, and the Dry Tortugas. The regiment was mustered out in April 1866.

== History ==
=== 5th Engineers ===
Organized February 10, 1864, from 15th Corps de Afrique Infantry. Attached to Engineer Brigade, Dept. of the Gulf, to April, 1864. Stationed at Berwick City and Brashear City, La., until March, 1864. Red River Campaign March 10-May 22. Advance from Franklin to Alexandria March 14–26, with Pontoon Train. Built bridge at Vermillionville Bayou March 18, and at Cane River March 30. Designation of Regiment changed to 99th United States Colored Troops April 4, 1864.

=== 99th Infantry ===
Organized April 4, 1864, from 5th Corps de Afrique Engineers. Attached to Engineer Brigade, Dept. of the Gulf, to October, 1864. 2nd Brigade, 1st Division, United States Colored Troops, Dept. of the Gulf, to February, 1865. District of Key West, Fla., to July, 1865. Dept. of Florida to April, 1866.

Red River Campaign to. May 22, 1864. Built bridges at Grand Ecore April 12. Built fortifications at Grand Ecore April 13–19. Repair road and crossing over Cane River April 19–20. Lower Crossing of Cane River April 22. At Alexandria constructing works and dam April 25-May 13. Retreat to Morganza May 18–22. Marksville May 16. Operations on Yellow Bayou May 17–20. Fatigue duty at Morganza until June 20. Ordered to New Orleans June 20. Duty at New Orleans and Plaquemine until December, 1864. At Key West and Tortugas, Fla., and in the Dept. of Florida until April, 1866. Operations near St. Marks, Fla., February 21-March 7, 1865. Newport Bridge March 5–6. Natural Bridge March 6. Mustered out April 28, 1866.
