= Northwoods National Cemetery =

Veterans cemetery in Oneida County, Wisconsin

- Interactive map of Northwoods National Cemetery

Details
- Established: 2015
- Location: Harshaw, Wisconsin
- Country: United States
- Coordinates: 45°40′53″N 89°40′38″W
- Type: United States National Cemetery
- Size: 6 acres (2.4 ha)
- Find a Grave: Northwoods National Cemetery

Northwoods National Cemetery is a national cemetery located in Oneida County, Wisconsin for veterans who served in the United States Armed Forces. The cemetery was purchased to service the needs of veterans, spouses, and eligible children within a 75-mile radius of nearby Rhinelander.

== History and location ==
On September 24, 2015, the United States Department of Veterans Affairs (VA) purchased the six acre property at 4520 Lakewood Road, Cassian, Wisconsin for $24,712.

As part of the VA National Cemetery Administration Rural Initiative, the cemetery will provide access to VA burial benefits for veterans residing in areas not previously within reasonable access to a national or state veterans cemetery. The cemetery is the second national cemetery in Wisconsin Wood National Cemetery, in Milwaukee, Wisconsin, was the only other VA national cemetery in the state and was no longer accepting new interments. There are also three state run veterans cemeteries in Wisconsin: Southern, Northern, and Central Wisconsin Veterans Memorial Cemeteries. Central Wisconsin Veterans Cemetery, in King, is located 114 Miles from Harshaw.

The design-build contract was awarded in August 2017. The first phase of construction will offer more than 3,380 casket and cremation spaces, with the capacity to serve more than 38,000 overall. Of these, about 24,000 will be in-ground interments. Construction will be completed in the fall of 2019, the estimated cost to complete the cemetery is 3.4 million dollars. Northwoods National Cemetery will be officially dedicated and open for interments in the spring of 2020.

Originally referred to as Rhinelander National Cemetery, it was officially designated Northwoods National Cemetery in July 2019.
