= James Byrnes (sailor) =

- Civil War era Navy Medal of Honor
- Born: James Fisher; 1838; Ireland
- Died: February 9, 1882 (aged 43–44); Manhattan, New York, US
- Burial place: Calvary Cemetery (Queens, New York)
- Military career
- Allegiance: United States of America
- Branch: United States Navy
- Rank: Boatswain's Mate
- Unit: USS Louisville
- Conflicts: Battle of Fort Hindman
- Awards: Medal of Honor

Boatswain's Mate James Byrnes (born James Fisher; 1838 – February 9, 1882) was an Irish sailor who fought in the American Civil War. Byrnes received the United States' highest award for bravery during combat, the Medal of Honor, for his action aboard the USS Louisville during the Battle of Fort Hindman. He was honored with the award on 3 April 1863.

== Biography ==
Byrnes was born in Ireland in 1838. He enlisted in the Navy from New York, and was assigned to the USS Louisville.

== Medal of Honor citation ==
Carrying out his duties through the thick of battle and acting as captain of a 9-inch gun, Brynes consistently showed "Attention to duty, bravery, and coolness in action against the enemy."

== See also ==
- List of American Civil War Medal of Honor recipients: A–F
