= Timothy Sullivan (Medal of Honor) =

American Civil War sailor

- Born: c. 1835; Ireland
- Died: October 6, 1910 (aged 74–75)
- Burial place: Los Angeles National Cemetery, Los Angeles
- Military career
- Allegiance: United States
- Branch: United States Navy
- Rank: Coxswain
- Unit: USS Louisville
- Conflicts: American Civil War
- Awards: Medal of Honor

Timothy Sullivan (c. 1835 – October 6, 1910) was a Union Navy sailor in the American Civil War and received the U.S. military's highest decoration, the Medal of Honor.

Born in about 1835 in Ireland, Sullivan immigrated to the United States and was living in New York when he joined the U.S. Navy. He served during the Civil War as a coxswain on the USS Louisville. Acting as a gun captain during battle, Sullivan showed "attention to duty, bravery, and coolness" through various engagements. For these actions, he was awarded the Medal of Honor on April 3, 1863.

Sullivan's official Medal of Honor citation reads:

Served on board the U.S.S. Louisville during various actions of that vessel. During the engagements of the Louisville, Sullivan served as first captain of a 9-inch gun and throughout his period of service was "especially commended for his attention to duty, bravery, and coolness in action."

Sullivan died on October 6, 1910, at age 74 or 75 and was buried at Los Angeles National Cemetery in Los Angeles, California.
