= Perry Wilkes =

Perry Wilkes (June 6, 1830 – March 19, 1889) was an American sailor who was awarded the Medal of Honor for actions during the American Civil War.

== Biography ==
Wilkes was born in Indiana on June 6, 1830. During the war, he served as the pilot aboard the USS Signal. He earned his medal on May 5, 1864, on the Red River, Louisiana. He died on March 19, 1889, and is buried in Cave Hill Cemetery, Louisville, Kentucky.

== Medal of Honor citation ==
For extraordinary heroism in action while serving as Pilot on board the USS Signal, Red River, 5 May 1864. Proceeding up the Red River, the USS Signal engaged a large force of enemy field batteries and sharpshooters, returning their fire until the ship was totally disabled, at which time the white flag was ordered raised. Acting as Pilot throughout the battle, Perry Wilkes stood by his wheel until it was disabled in his hands by a bursting enemy shell.
