= William Talbott =

William R. Talbott
- Civil War era Navy Medal of Honor
- Born: c.1812 Liverpool, England
- Died: September 5, 1888 (aged 75–76); Bath, Maine
- Burial place: Maple Grove Cemetery; Bath, Maine
- Military career
- Allegiance: United States of America
- Branch: United States Navy; Union Navy
- Rank: Captain of the Forecastle
- Unit: U.S.S. Louisville
- Awards: Medal of Honor

William R. Talbott proper spelling Talbot (c. 1812 – September 5, 1888) was an English sailor who served in the Union Navy of the United States during the American Civil War. He received the Medal of Honor for valor.

== Medal of Honor citation ==
Citation:

Served as captain of the forecastle on board the U.S.S. Louisville at the capture of the Arkansas post, 10 and 11 January 1863. Carrying out his duties as captain of a 9 inch gun, Talbott was conspicuous for ability and bravery throughout this engagement with the enemy.

== See also ==
- List of American Civil War Medal of Honor recipients: T-Z
