= George Butts =

- Born: 1838; Rome, New York
- Died: February 17, 1902 (aged 63–64); Ohio
- Burial place: Ridgelawn Cemetery
- Military career
- Allegiance: United States of America
- Branch: United States Navy
- Rank: Gunner's Mate
- Unit: (Ohio) U.S. Navy
- Conflicts: Red River Campaign
- Awards: Medal of Honor

Gunner's Mate George Butts (1838 – February 17, 1902) was an American soldier who fought in the American Civil War. Butts received the country's highest award for bravery during combat, the Medal of Honor, for his action aboard the USS Signal during the Red River Campaign on 6 May 1864. He was honored with the award on 31 December 1864.

== Biography ==
Butts was born in Rome, New York in 1838. He enlisted into the United States Navy. He died on 17 February 1902 and his remains are interred at the Ridgelawn Cemetery in Ohio.

== Medal of Honor citation ==
Proceeding up the Red River, the U.S.S. Signal engaged a large force of enemy field batteries and sharpshooters, returning their fire until the ship was totally disabled, at which time the white flag was raised. Although entered on the sick list, Butts courageously carried out his duties during the entire engagement.

== See also ==
- List of American Civil War Medal of Honor recipients: A–F
