= USS Covington (1863) =

Union Navy gunboat

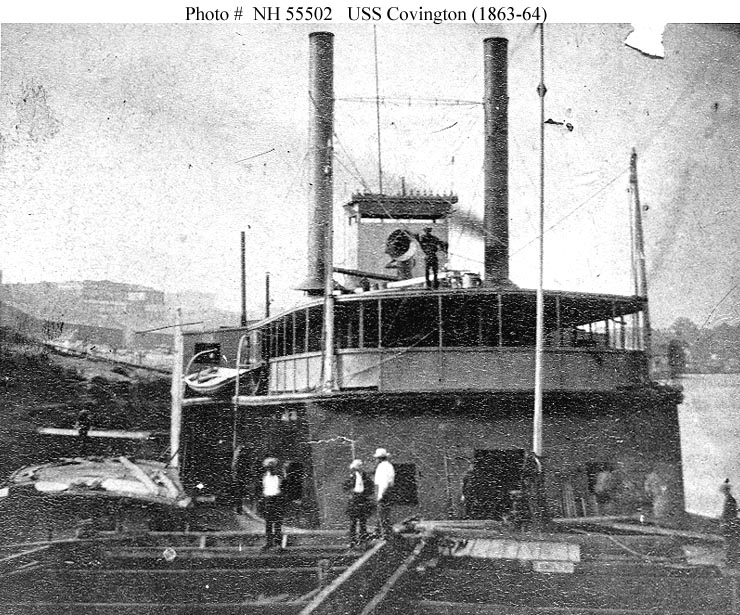
- USS Covington, circa 1863–64

History

United States
- Acquired: February 1863
- Fate: Burned, 5 May 1864

General characteristics
- Displacement: 224 Tons
- Length: 126 ft (38 m)
- Beam: 37 ft (11 m)
- Depth of hold: 6 ft 6 in (1.98 m)
- Propulsion: steam engine; side wheel-propelled
- Complement: 76
- Armament: two 30-pounder rifles; two 50-pounder rifles; four 24-pounder smoothbores

USS Covington was an ironclad gunboat purchased by the Union Navy during the American Civil War. She was assigned as a simple gunboat with powerful rifled guns to intercept blockade runners attempting to run the Union blockade of the Confederate States of America.

Covington did not carry mortars or howitzers, which placed her at a disadvantage when attacked riverside in 1864 by Confederate troops. Losing the battle, she was set on fire. Most of the crew escaped.

== Service history ==
Covington, a side wheel steamer, was purchased in February 1863 from Samuel Wiggins at Cincinnati, Ohio; fitted for service at Cairo, Illinois; and assigned to the Mississippi Squadron, Acting Volunteer Lieutenant George P. Lord in command. Serving in the Tennessee River to convoy Union Army transports and other ships, Covington had frequent encounters with Confederates along the banks. On 18 June, she was transferred to the Mississippi River for similar duty on that river and the White, Black, and Red Rivers. Arriving at Memphis, Tennessee, on 20 June 1863, she sailed the following day convoying General Lyon and Little Rebel. She seized the steamer Eureka at Commerce, Missouri, on 2 July for violation of the river blockade and sent her into Cairo. On 6 August she aided Paw Paw, sunk by a snag.

Ordered to report to Alexandria, Louisiana, on 27 April 1864, Covington sailed with Signal protecting the Army transport Warner down the Red River. About 25 miles below Alexandria, they were attacked by Confederate infantry in force. After five hours of bitter fighting, the transport was captured and the two escorts (Covington and Signal) were so badly damaged that they had to be abandoned and set afire. After Covington was set on fire by her crew, Lieutenant Lord and 32 of Covingtons crew escaped to Alexandria. Signal's crew, however, was not so fortunate. After setting their ship on fire, they were captured by Confederate forces and made prisoners-of-war.
