= USS Louisville (1861) =

Gunboat of the United States Navy

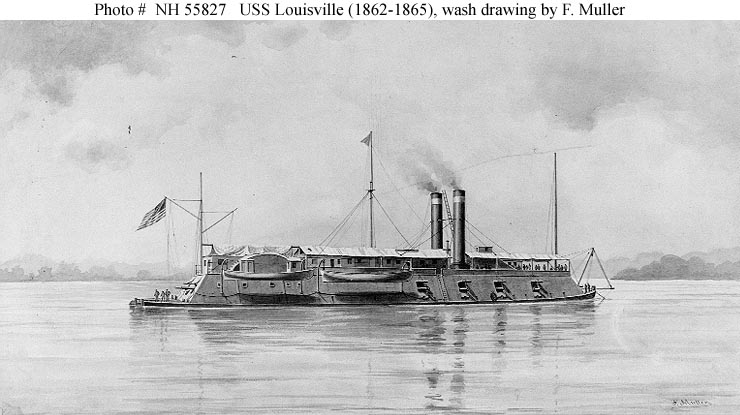
- USS Louisville

History

United States
- Name: USS Louisville
- Ordered: 7 August 1861
- Builder: James Buchanan Eads
- Cost: $89,000
- Laid down: September 1861
- Launched: October 1861
- Commissioned: 16 January 1862
- Decommissioned: 21 July 1865
- Fate: Sold, 30 September 1868

General characteristics
- Class & type: City-class ironclad gunboat
- Displacement: 512 long tons (520 t)
- Length: 175 ft (53 m)
- Beam: 51 ft (16 m)
- Draft: 6 ft (1.8 m)
- Propulsion: Centerline paddlewheel, two horizontal steam engines
- Speed: 9 knots (17 km/h; 10 mph)
- Complement: 251 officers and men
- Armament: Varies (see section below)
- Armor: Casemate: 2.5 in (64 mm); Pilothouse: 1.25 in (32 mm)

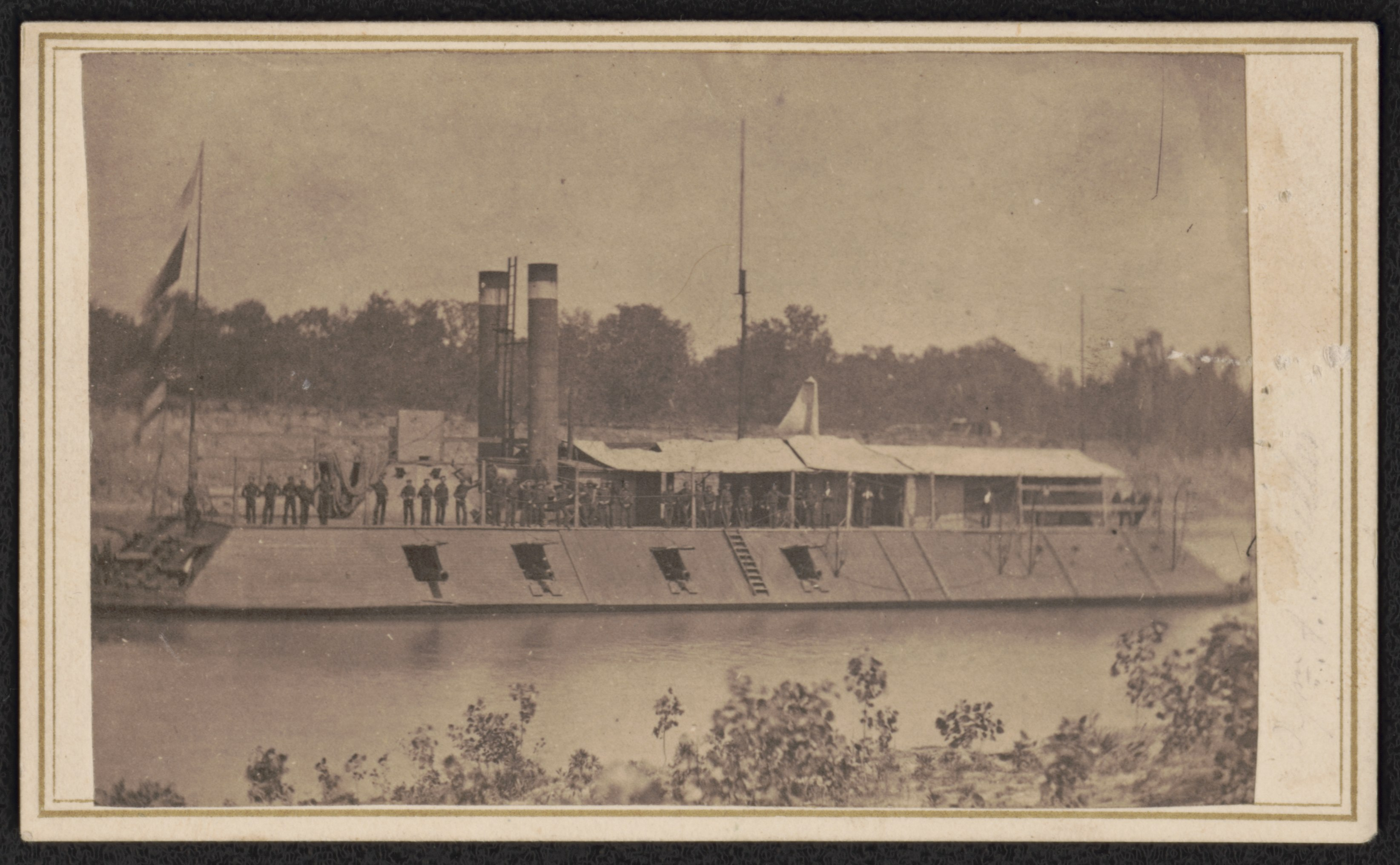
Ironclad gunboat USS Louisville on the Red River

USS Louisville was a City-class ironclad gunboat constructed for the U.S. Army by James B. Eads during the American Civil War. (While initially owned by the Army, the City-class gunboats were commanded by U.S. Navy officers, and were eventually transferred to the Navy.)

Louisville was built at St. Louis, Missouri, by James B. Eads in 1861, under contract with the War Department for the price of $89,000. Designed by U.S. Navy "Constructor" (Naval Engineer) Samuel M. Pook, she was accepted 15 January 1862; and commissioned 16 January 1862, Commander Benjamin M. Dove, USN, in command. Despite being designed by naval personnel, budgetary concerns led the War Department to fund construction of Louisville with Army funds. As such, she was turned over to Army command upon completion and joined the Army's Mississippi River Squadron. Eventually the entire western river flotilla would be transferred to Navy command.

== Operational history ==
Louisville assisted the Army in the capture of Fort Donelson on the Cumberland River 14 to 16 February 1862. From 1 to 5 March, she aided in the occupation of Columbus, Kentucky, the "Gibraltar of the West." Departing Cairo, Illinois, 14 March, she served in the capture of Island No. 10 and New Madrid, Missouri, through 7 April, and helped to prevent southern ships from ascending the river.

In May, Louisville was ordered to Fort Pillow and participated in the First Battle of Memphis 6 June. Commanded by Rear Admiral Charles Henry Davis, her squadron captured and sank the Confederate Mississippi flotilla. On 15 June, she attacked the upper batteries at Vicksburg, before shifting efforts to the White River, departing Helena, Arkansas, 5 August. Escorting Benton and General Bragg (gunboat) to the mouth of the river, she met little resistance. In late September 1862 she was transferred to the Navy and assigned a new commanding officer, Lieutenant Commander Richard W. Meade.

After escorting transport Meteor, disembarking troops at Bledsoe's and Hamblen's landings 21 October, Louisville returned to Helena to join the gunboat fleet, Mississippi Squadron. She joined Baron DeKalb, Cincinnati, Lexington, Signal, New Era, Romeo, Rattler, and Glide later in the month on an expedition up the White River in support of Major General William T. Sherman's army. Louisville captured the steamer Evansville near Island No. 36 on 1 November.

Now under the command of Lieutenant Elias K. Owen, Louisville aided in the capture of Fort Hindman, Arkansas Post, 4 to 11 January 1863, and formed part of the expedition through Steele's Bayou, 14 to 28 January. She was ordered to the Yazoo River the 31st and moved to stop Confederates felling trees across the bayou on 21 March. She then turned her attention to the batteries on the river, running past those at Vicksburg on 16 April, and engaging the lower ones on the 29th. She joined Pittsburgh, Mound City and Carondolet on that date, silencing the guns of the fort on Grand Gulf and helping to establish the siege which forced Vicksburg's surrender 4 July 1863.

From 12 March to 22 May 1864, Louisville joined in the expedition up the Red River. On 2 June she engaged Confederate batteries seven miles below Columbia, Arkansas, silencing the guns. She landed Union troops at Sunnyside 6 June and anchored off Shipwith's Landing the 20th, to learn that Confederates were traveling upriver with a heavy force, and had crossed Cypress Creek and Bartholomew's Bayou 20 June with cavalry, infantry, and artillery. On learning that Parsson's brigade was 10 miles back of Gaines' Landing, providing reinforcements, Louisville departed immediately for that point, and helped break up the Confederate attack.

Louisville continued service on the Mississippi River until decommissioning 21 July 1865. She was sold at public auction at Mound City, Illinois 29 November 1865. Four of her sailors were awarded the Medal of Honor for their service in the war: Boatswain's Mate Charles Bradley, Boatswain's Mate James Byrnes, Coxswain Timothy Sullivan, and Captain of the Forecastle William Talbott.

== Armament ==
Like many of the Mississippi theatre ironclads, Louisville had its armament changed multiple times over life of the vessel. To expedite the entrance of Louisville into service, she and the other City-class ships were fitted with whatever weapons were available; then had their weapons upgraded as new pieces became available. Though the 8-inch Dahlgren smoothbore cannons were fairly modern most of the other original armaments were antiquated; such as the 32-pounders, or modified; such as the 42-pounder "rifles" which were in fact, old smoothbores that had been gouged out to give them rifling. These 42-pounder weapons were of particular concern to military commanders because they were structurally weaker and more prone to exploding than purpose built rifled cannons. Additionally, the close confines of riverine combat greatly increased the threat of boarding parties. The 12-pounder howitzer was equipped to address that concern and was not used in regular combat.

Ordnance characteristics
January 1862	September 1862	Early 1864
• 3 × 8-inch smoothbores • 4 × 42-pounder rifles • 6 × 32-pounder rifles • 1 × 12-pounder rifle	• 3 × 9-inch smoothbores • 1 × 8-inch smoothbore • 2 × 42-pounder rifles • 6 × 32-pounder rifles • 2 × 30-pounder rifles • 1 × 12-pounder rifle	• 4 × 9-inch smoothbores • 1 × 100-pounder rifle • 6 × 32-pounder rifles • 2 × 30-pounder rifles • 1 × 12-pounder rifle

== See also ==
- Union Navy
- Anaconda Plan
- Mississippi Squadron
- Seth Ledyard Phelps (commander in Mississippi River Squadron)
