= USS Signal (1862) =

Gunboat of the United States Navy

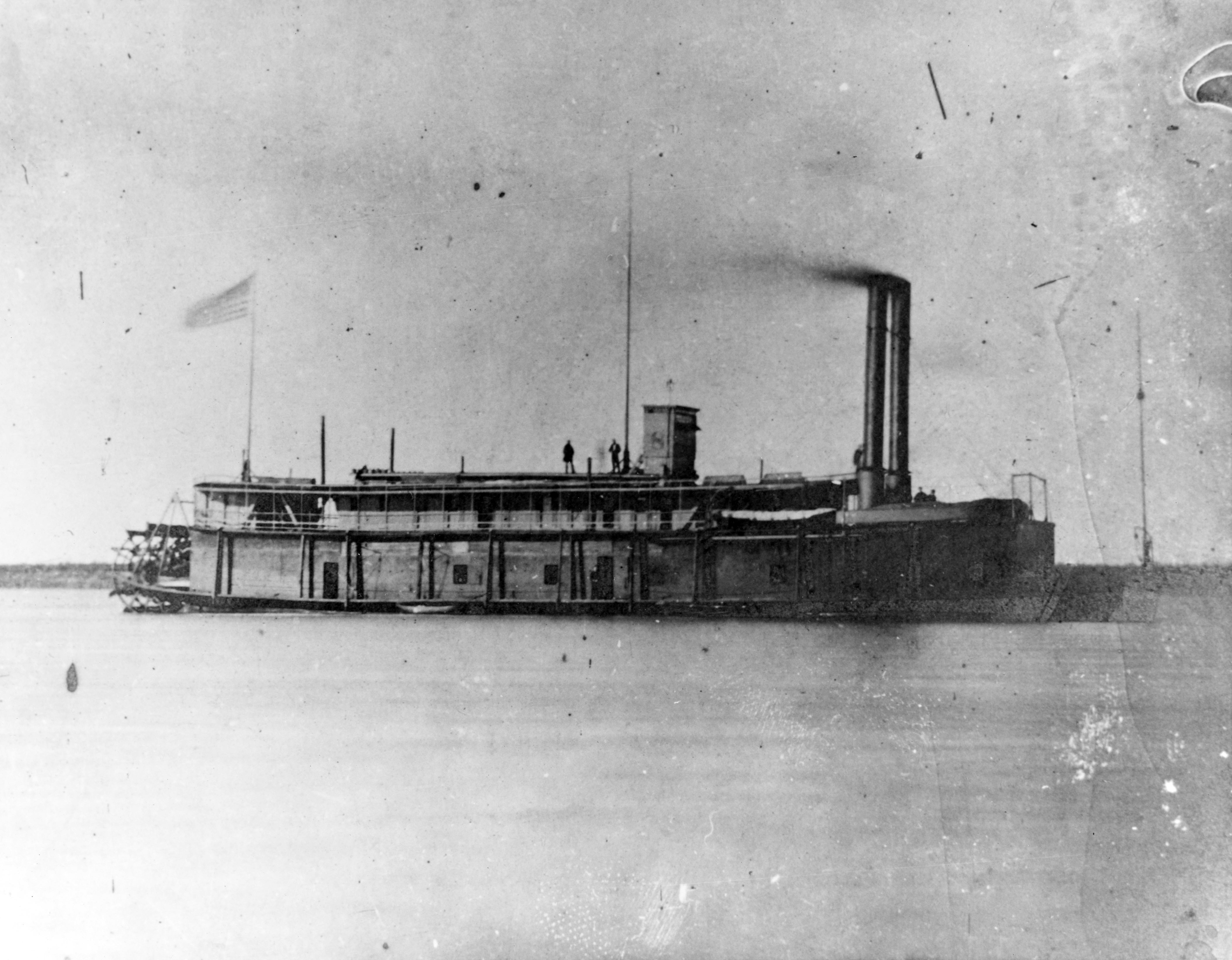
- USS Signal tinclad, circa 1863–64

History

Union Navy Jack
- Launched: 1862
- In service: circa 22 October 1862
- Fate: Burned 5 May 1864

General characteristics
- Displacement: 190 tons
- Length: 157 ft (48 m)
- Beam: 30 ft (9.1 m)
- Draft: 1 ft 10 in (0.56 m)
- Depth of hold: 4 ft 4 in (1.32 m)
- Propulsion: steam engine; stern wheel-propelled
- Armament: 2 × 30-pounder Parrott rifles; 4 × 24-pounder howitzers; 2 × 12-pounder Dahlgren guns

USS Signal was a small 190-ton steamship that was acquired during the second year of the American Civil War by the Union Navy and outfitted as a gunboat. She additionally served other types of duty, such as that of dispatch vessel and convoy escort.

== Service history ==
The first ship to be named Signal by the Navy—a wooden-hulled, stern-wheel steamer built in 1862 at Wheeling, Virginia (now West Virginia)—was purchased by the U.S. Navy on 22 September 1862 at Saint Louis, Missouri. Although no record of her commissioning has been found, it is known that she was in operation on 22 October 1862, when she departed Carondelet, Missouri and headed down the Mississippi River to join in the campaign against the Confederate river fortress at Vicksburg, Mississippi. Acting Volunteer Lieutenant John Scott was mentioned as her commanding officer in an order issued on 14 November and presumably commanded the ship from the start of her service. Signal's first weeks were devoted to duty as a dispatch vessel. On 29 November, she and Marmora entered the Yazoo River on a reconnaissance expedition and ascended that stream some 21 miles. From time to time, riflemen fired upon the ships from the river banks; but, in each instance, the ships shelled and dispersed the attackers. That afternoon, the ships returned to the Mississippi unharmed.

Signal's work for the day steaming up and down shallow, winding streams in hostile territory was a sample of the service she would perform throughout her career. She and Marmora again ascended the Yazoo on 11 December to obtain information needed for a projected joint Army-Navy expedition in that area to outflank Vicksburg. They discovered Confederates had placed torpedoes (mines) in the channel and returned to report and to volunteer to destroy the explosive devices. The next morning, accompanied by USS Cairo, USS Pittsburgh, and USS Queen of the West, they returned up the Yazoo to destroy the "infernal machines." During this early mine sweeping operation, one of the torpedoes exploded under Cairo, and she sank 12 minutes later. Cairo was the first of over 40 Union ships to be torpedoed during the Civil War. The expedition returned to the Mississippi after dark that evening bringing the survivors from Cairo.

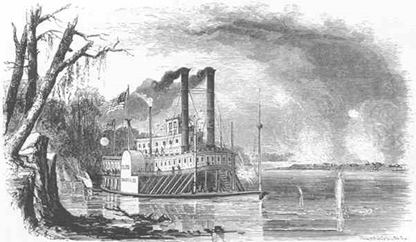
The steamer Henry Von Phul, which Signal helped defend on 8 December 1863

On 4 January 1863, Signal got underway in an expedition up the White River to attack Fort Hindman, which surrendered on the 11th, after a three-day battle. About a month later, Signal made a reconnaissance up the White River and brought back information of the military situation at Little Rock, Arkansas. Late in February, Signal returned to the Yazoo and devoted most of her time probing that stream until Vicksburg fell on 4 July. During the ensuing months, Signal served as a dispatch vessel and patrolled the Mississippi to interdict Confederate commerce especially from the Red River. On 8 December 1863, Signal and USS Neosho defended disabled merchant steamer Henry Von Phul, which had been shelled by a Southern shore battery. On 19 April 1864, Signal was ordered to ascend the Red River to Alexandria, Louisiana to protect coal and provision barges waiting there for the use of the flotilla of gunboats Rear Admiral David D. Porter had led farther upstream in the campaign known as the Red River Expedition.

=== Loss ===
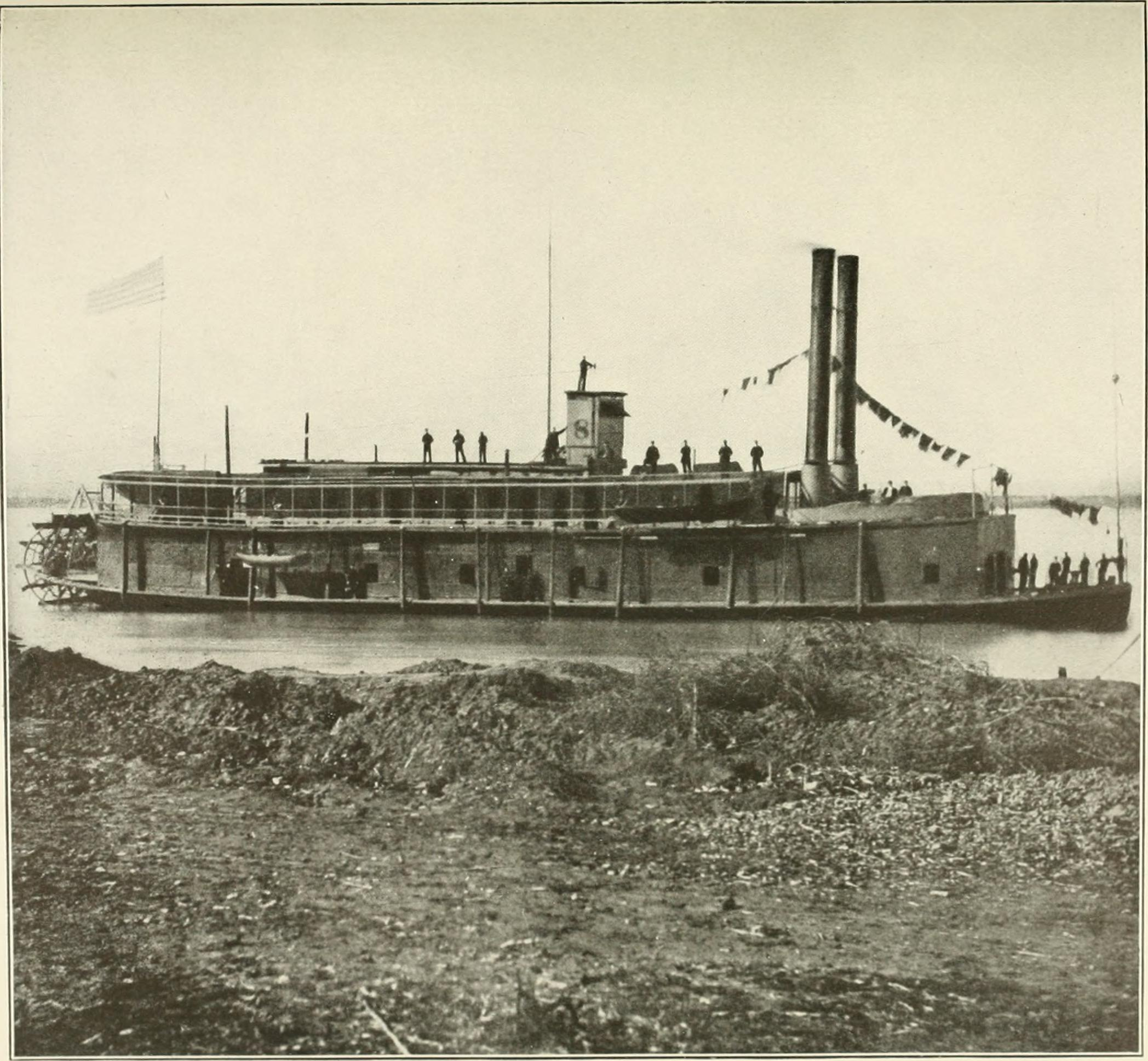
USS Signal sometime during the Civil War

On 4 May 1864, Signal was ordered "to take on board a bearer of dispatches from Mayor General Nathaniel Prentice Banks and proceed down the river..." About 20 miles down stream, the ship was fired upon by Confederate cavalrymen under Colonel George Wythe Baylor, and she returned the fire with her starboard guns. The engagement continued intermittently until she reached USS Covington and Army transport John Warner some four more miles below. Signal rounded to and made fast to the stern of Covington, and both ships continued to engage the Confederates throughout the day and night. At daylight, the three ships got underway; but, upon rounding Dunn's Bayou, John Warner's whistle signaled "enemy in sight." Artillery and small arms fire soon disabled the transport which drifted ashore blocking the channel below the gunboats.

In the ensuing battle, Signal was disabled and ran aground where she was reluctantly set afire and abandoned by her crew which was captured ashore. The two other ships were also lost. However, most of the crew of Covington, along with Covington's captain, managed to escape and make its way back to safety at Alexandria. Signal's captured crew was held at the Camp Ford prisoner of war camp near Tyler, Texas. The prisoner exchange lists show thirty-nine men from this vessel as being exchanged from this camp. Six of the crew members, Quarter Gunner Charles Asten, Gunner's Mate George Butts, Seaman John Hyland, Seaman Timothy O'Donoghue, Boatswain's Mate Michael McCormick, and Pilot Perry Wilkes, were awarded the Medal of Honor for their conduct during the ship's final engagement on the Red River.

== See also ==
- Anaconda Plan
- Mississippi Squadron
