= USS Fort Hindman =

Gunboat of the United States Navy

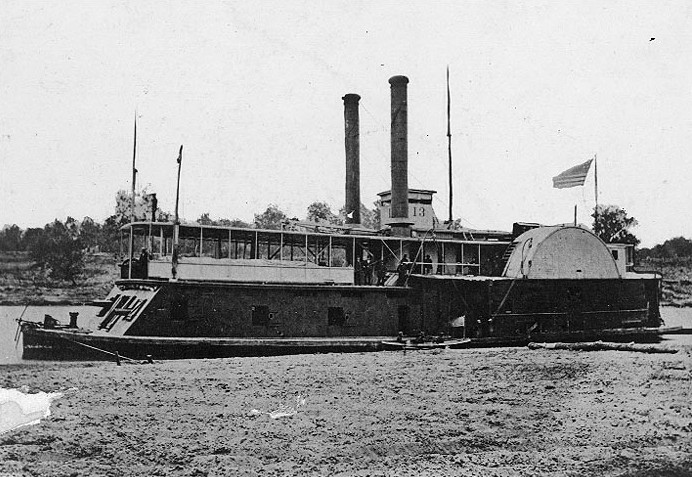
- USS Fort Hindman during her Civil War service

History

United States
- Name: James Thompson (pre-war); USS Manitou (1863); USS Fort Hindman (1863–1865); James Thompson (post-war)
- Namesake: Fort Hindman, a fortification on the Arkansas River, captured from the Confederates in January 1863 during the Battle of Arkansas Post
- Ordered: as James Thompson
- Yard number: Tinclad #13
- Laid down: date unknown
- Launched: in 1862 at Jeffersonville, Indiana
- Acquired: 14 March 1863
- Commissioned: circa 14 March 1863
- Decommissioned: 3 August 1865 at Mound City, Illinois
- Stricken: 1865 (est.)
- Fate: Sold 17 August 1865
- Notes: Renamed James Thompson and remained in use until about 1874

General characteristics
- Type: river gunboat
- Displacement: 286 tons
- Length: 150 ft (46 m)
- Beam: 37 ft (11 m)
- Draught: 28 ft (8.5 m)
- Propulsion: steam engine; side-wheel propelled
- Speed: not known
- Complement: not known
- Armament: two 8" smoothbore guns; four 8" guns
- Armor: tinclad

USS Fort Hindman was a steamer acquired by the Union Navy during the American Civil War. She was placed in service and used by the Navy to patrol navigable waterways of the Confederacy to prevent the South from trading with other countries.

== History ==
The ship was purchased 14 March 1863 as James Thompson, a side wheel steamer; she was converted into a river gunboat by the addition of timber bulwarks and thin iron plate: a style of warship commonly referred to as a "tinclad".

She joined the Mississippi Squadron in April 1863, Acting Volunteer Lieutenant Thomas O. Selfridge Jr. in command; was renamed Manitou 23 March 1863; and renamed Fort Hindman 8 November 1863. The USS Fort Hindman was designed to patrol in shallow waters and small tributaries where heavier ironclads could not enter. Her light armor was only intended to stop small arms fire.

In July 1863, the steamer headed an expedition up the Little Red River, a tributary of the Black River, and captured quantities of ordnance and Confederate Government provisions, as well as the heavier Federal ironclad Louisville.

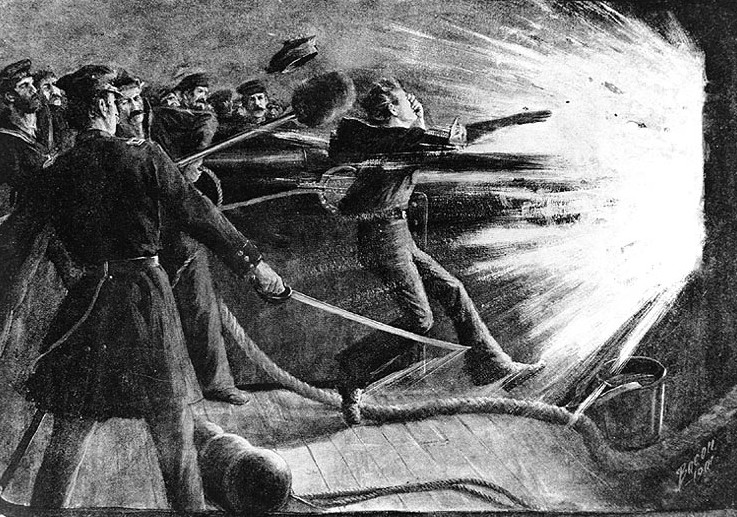
An illustration of Duncan throwing the burning cartridge overboard

She continued to patrol the central Mississippi River and its tributaries, taking a Confederate merchantman prize in the Red River on 1 March 1864, engaging Confederate sharpshooters and a battery ashore in the Black River and later that day in the Ouachita River.

On 2 March 1864, during an engagement near Harrisonburg, Louisiana, Ordinary Seaman James K. L. Duncan threw a burning cartridge overboard after it was set afire by an exploding shell, and Ordinary Seaman Hugh Molloy loaded one of the ships guns from an exposed position after a shipmate had been mortally wounded. Both Duncan and Molloy were later awarded the Medal of Honor for their heroism in the engagement.

During the expedition, Fort Hindman transported troops and prisoners of war, over and over again engaged Confederate batteries, and took part in the passage of the falls off Alexandria, Louisiana, on 8 May.

Moving to a more southerly patrol area, Fort Hindman operated in the rivers and bayous of Louisiana, occasionally returning to Natchez, Mississippi. She arrived at Mound City, Illinois, 1 August 1865. There she was decommissioned on 3 August 1865, and sold on 17 August 1865.

== See also ==
- Blockade runners of the American Civil War
