= List of American Civil War Medal of Honor recipients: Q–S =

The Medal of Honor is the highest military decoration awarded by the United States government and is bestowed on a member of the United States armed forces who distinguishes himself "…conspicuously by gallantry and intrepidity at the risk of his life above and beyond the call of duty while engaged in an action against an enemy of the United States…" Due to the nature of this medal, it is commonly presented posthumously.

Many of the awards during the Civil War were for capturing or saving regimental flags. During the Civil War, regimental flags served as the rallying point for the unit, and guided the unit's movements. Loss of the flag could greatly disrupt a unit, and could have a greater effect than the death of the commanding officer.

Recipients are listed alphabetically by last name. Posthumous receipt is denoted by an asterisk.

== Q ==
Recipients are listed alphabetically by last name. Posthumous receipt is denoted by an asterisk.

This along with the *, indicates that the Medal of Honor was awarded posthumously

Image	Name	Service	Rank	Unit/Command	Place of action	Date of action	Notes
Profile of a white man with a mustache, wearing a dark suit coat and bow tie.	Matthew S. Quay	Army	Colonel	134th Pennsylvania Infantry	Battle of Fredericksburg, Virginia	Dec 13, 1862	Although out of service, he voluntarily resumed duty on the eve of battle and took a conspicuous part in the charge on the heights.
Head and shoulders of a white man with a drooping mustache, wearing a cavalry hat and a double-breasted military jacket with two medals pinned to the left breast.	James Quinlan	Army	Major	(New York (state)) 88th New York Infantry	Battle of Savage's Station, Virginia	Jun 29, 1862	Led his regiment on the enemy's battery, silenced the guns, held the position against overwhelming numbers, and covered the retreat of the 2d Army Corps.

== R ==
Recipients are listed alphabetically by last name. Posthumous receipt is denoted by an asterisk.

This along with the *, indicates that the Medal of Honor was awarded posthumously

Image	Name	Service	Rank	Unit/Command	Place of action	Date of action	Notes
Medal of Honor winner Peter F. Rafferty	Peter Rafferty	Army	Private	(New York (state)) Company B, 69th New York Infantry	Battle of Malvern Hill, Virginia	Jul 1, 1862	Having been wounded and directed to the rear, declined to go, but continued in action, receiving several additional wounds, which resulted in his capture by the enemy and his total disability for military service.
—	Alfred Ramsbottom	Army	First Sergeant	Company K, 97th Ohio Infantry	Second Battle of Franklin, Tennessee	Nov 30, 1864	Captured the flag of the 2d Mississippi Infantry (C.S.A.), in a hand-to-hand fight with the color bearer.
Medal of Honor winner Charles Franklin Rand	Charles F. Rand	Army	Private	(New York (state)) Company K, 12th New York Infantry	Battle of Blackburn's Ford, Virginia	Jul 18, 1861	Remained in action when a part of his regiment broke in disorder, joined another company, and fought with it through the remainder of the engagement.
—	John Rannahan	Marine Corps	Corporal	(United States Marine Corps) USS Minnesota	USS Minnesota Landing Party, Second Battle of Fort Fisher	Jan 15, 1865	On board USS Minnesota in the assault on Fort Fisher, 15 January 1865.
Medal of Honor winner George E Ranney	George E. Ranney	Army	Assistant Surgeon	2nd Michigan Volunteer Cavalry Regiment	Battle of Resaca, Georgia	May 14, 1864	At great personal risk, went to the aid of a wounded soldier, Pvt. Charles W. Baker, lying under heavy fire between the lines, and with the aid of an orderly carried him to a place of safety.
—	Myron H. Ranney	Army	Private	(New York (state)) Company G, 13th New York Volunteer Infantry	Second Battle of Bull Run, Virginia	Aug 30, 1862	Picked up the colors and carried them off the field after the color bearer had been shot down; was himself wounded.
—	Edward Ratcliff	Army	First Sergeant	(United States) Company C, 38th U.S. Colored Troops	Battle of Chaffin's Farm, Virginia	Sep 29, 1864	Commanded and gallantly led his company after the commanding officer had been killed; was the first enlisted man to enter the enemy's works.
Medal of Honor winner Jacob F Raub	Jacob F. Raub	Army	Assistant Surgeon	210th Pennsylvania Infantry Regiment	Battle of Hatcher's Run, Virginia	Feb 5, 1865	Discovering a flank movement by the enemy, appraised the commanding general at great peril, and though a noncombatant voluntarily participated with the troops in repelling this attack.
Medal of Honor winner William H Raymond	William H. Raymond	Army	Corporal	(New York (state)) Company A, 108th New York Volunteer Infantry	Battle of Gettysburg, Pennsylvania	Jul 3, 1863	Voluntarily and under a severe fire brought a box of ammunition to his comrades on the skirmish line.
—	Charles Read	Navy	Ordinary Seaman	(United States Navy) USS Magnolia	USS Magnolia Landing Party, Battle of Natural Bridge	March 6, 1865	As seaman on board USS Magnolia, St. Marks, Florida, 5 and 6 March 1865.
—	Charles A. Read	Navy	Coxswain	(United States Navy) USS Kearsarge	Aboard USS Kearsarge off Cherbourg, France	June 19, 1864	Served as coxswain on board USS Kearsarge when she destroyed Alabama off Cherbourg, France, 19 June 1864.
—	George E. Read	Navy	Seaman	(United States Navy) USS Kearsarge	Aboard USS Kearsarge off Cherbourg, France	June 19, 1864	Served as seaman on board USS Kearsarge when she destroyed Alabama off Cherbourg, France, 19 June 1864.
—	Morton A. Read	Army	Lieutenant	(New York (state)) Company D, 8th New York Volunteer Cavalry Regiment	Battle of Appomattox Station, Virginia	Apr 8, 1865	Capture of flag of 1st Texas Infantry (C.S.A.).
—	George F. Rebmann	Army	Sergeant	Company B, 119th Illinois Infantry Regiment	Battle of Fort Blakeley, Alabama	Apr 9, 1865	Capture of flag.
Head and torso of a white man with a tuft of hair on his chin, wearing a military jacket buttoned only at the neck.	William H. Reddick	Army	Corporal	Company B, 33rd Ohio Volunteer Infantry Regiment	Great Locomotive Chase, Georgia	Apr 1862	Sixth person to receive Medal of Honor
Medal of Honor winner Axel Hayford Reed	Axel H. Reed	Army	Sergeant	Company K, 2nd Minnesota Volunteer Infantry Regiment	Battle of Chickamauga, Georgia and Battle of Missionary Ridge, Tenn.	Sep 19, 1863 and Nov 25, 1863	While in arrest at Chickamauga, Georgia, left his place in the rear and voluntarily went to the line of battle, secured a rifle, and fought gallantly during the two-day battle; was released from arrest in recognition of his bravery. At Missionary Ridge commanded his company and gallantly led it, being among the first to enter the enemy's works; was severely wounded, losing an arm, but declined a discharge and remained in active service to the end of the war.
Medal of Honor winner Charles Wellington Reed	Charles W. Reed	Army	Bugler	9th Independent Battery, Massachusetts Light Artillery	Battle of Gettysburg, Pennsylvania	Jul 2, 1863	Rescued his wounded captain from between the lines.
—	George W. Reed	Army	Private	Company E, 11th Pennsylvania Infantry Regiment	Battle of Globe Tavern, Virginia	Aug 21, 1864	Capture of flag of 24th North Carolina Volunteers (C.S.A.).
—	William Reed	Army	Private	Company H, 8th Missouri Volunteer Infantry	Battle of Vicksburg, Mississippi	May 22, 1863	Gallantry in the charge of the "volunteer storming party."
Medal of Honor winner Charles Avery Reeder	Charles A. Reeder	Army	Private	Company G, 12th West Virginia Volunteer Infantry Regiment	Fort Gregg, Third Battle of Petersburg, Virginia	Apr 2, 1865	Capture of flag
—	Jeremiah Regan	Navy	Quartermaster	(United States Navy) USS Galena	Aboard USS Galena, Drewry's Bluff	May 15, 1862	As captain of No. 2 gun on board USS Galena in the attack upon Drewry's Bluff, 15 May 1862.
Medal of Honor winner Robert Alexander Reid	Robert Reid	Army	Private	Company G, 48th Pennsylvania Infantry Regiment	Second Battle of Petersburg, Virginia	Jun 17, 1864	Capture of flag of 44th Tennessee Infantry (C.S.A.).
Medal of Honor winner Daniel Peter Reigle	Daniel P. Reigle	Army	Corporal	Company F, 87th Pennsylvania Infantry	Battle of Cedar Creek, Virginia	Oct 19, 1864	For gallantry while rushing forward to capture a Confederate flag at the stone fence where the enemy's last stand was made.
Medal of Honor winner James Monroe Reisinger	J. Monroe Reisinger	Army	Corporal	Company H, 150th Pennsylvania Infantry Regiment	Battle of Gettysburg, Pennsylvania	Jul 1, 1863	Specially brave and meritorious conduct in the face of the enemy. Awarded under Act of Congress, January 25, 1907.
—	Louis Renninger	Army	Corporal	Company H, 37th Ohio Volunteer Infantry Regiment	Battle of Vicksburg, Mississippi	May 22, 1863	Gallantry in the charge of the "volunteer storming party."
—	George Reynolds	Army	Private	(New York (state)) Company M, 9th New York Volunteer Cavalry Regiment	Battle of Opequon, Virginia	Sep 19, 1864	Capture of Virginia State flag.
Medal of Honor winner Julius Dexter Rhodes	Julius D. Rhodes	Army	Private	(New York (state)) Company F, 5th New York Cavalry Regiment	Battle of Thoroughfare Gap, Virginia and Second Battle of Bull Run, Virginia	Aug 28, 1862 and Aug 30, 1862	After having had his horse shot under him in the fight at Thoroughfare Gap, Virginia, he voluntarily joined the 105th New York Volunteers and was conspicuous in the advance on the enemy's lines. Displayed gallantry in the advance on the skirmish line at Bull Run, Virginia, where he was wounded.
Medal of Honor winner Sylvester D Rhodes	Sylvester D. Rhodes	Army	Sergeant	Company D, 61st Pennsylvania Infantry Regiment	Battle of Fisher's Hill, Virginia	Sep 22, 1864	Was on the skirmish line which drove the enemy from the first entrenchment and was the first man to enter the breastworks, capturing one of the guns and turning it upon the enemy.
—	Charles Rice	Navy	Coal Heaver	(United States Navy) USS Agawam	Aboard USS Agawam, First Battle of Fort Fisher	December 23, 1864	On board USS Agawam, as one of a volunteer crew of a powder boat which was exploded near Fort Fisher, 23 December 1864.
Head and torso of a white man with thick dark hair and a full beard, wearing a double-breasted military jacket with a rectangular patch atop each shoulder.	Edmund Rice	Army	Major	19th Massachusetts Volunteer Infantry Regiment	Battle of Gettysburg, Pennsylvania	Jul 3, 1863	Conspicuous bravery on the third day of the battle on the countercharge against Pickett's division where he fell severely wounded within the enemy's lines.
—	Carlos H. Rich	Army	First Sergeant	Company K, 4th Vermont Volunteer Infantry Regiment	Battle of the Wilderness, Virginia	May 5, 1864	Saved the life of an officer.
—	Louis Richards	Navy	Quartermaster	(United States Navy) USS Pensacola	Aboard USS Pensacola, Battle of Forts Jackson and St. Philip	Apr 24, 1862 – Apr 25, 1862	Richards served as quartermaster on board USS Pensacola in the attack upon Forts Jackson and St. Philip, and at the taking of New Orleans, 24 and 25 April 1862.
—	William R. Richardson	Army	Private	Company A, 2nd Ohio Cavalry	Battle of Sayler's Creek, Virginia	Apr 6, 1865	Having been captured and taken to the rear, made his escape rejoined the Union lines, and furnished information of great importance as to the enemy's position and the approaches thereto.
Medal of Honor winner William E Richey	William E. Richey	Army	Corporal	Company F, 2nd Ohio Cavalry	Battle of Chickamauga, Georgia	Sep 19, 1863	While on the extreme front, between the lines of the combatants single-handed he captured a Confederate major who was armed and mounted.
—	James Richmond*	Army	Private	Company F, 8th Ohio Infantry	Battle of Gettysburg, Pennsylvania	Jul 3, 1863	Capture of flag.
—	John H. Ricksecker	Army	Private	Company D, 104th Ohio Infantry	Second Battle of Franklin, Tennessee	Nov 30, 1864	Capture of flag of 16th Alabama Artillery (C.S.A.).
—	Rudolph R. Riddell	Army	Lieutenant	(New York (state)) Company I, 61st New York Volunteer Infantry Regiment	Battle of Sayler's Creek, Virginia	Apr 6, 1865	Captured the flag of the 6th Alabama Cavalry (C.S.A.).
—	Thomas Riley	Army	Private	Company D, 1st Louisiana Cavalry Regiment	Battle of Fort Blakeley, Alabama	Apr 4, 1865	Captured the flag of the 6th Alabama Cavalry.
—	Edward Ringold	Navy	Coxswain	(United States Navy) USS Wabash	USS Wabash Landing Party, Pocotaligo, South Carolina	Oct 22, 1862	Served on board USS Wabash.
	William Y. W. Ripley	Army	Lieutenant Colonel	1st United States Sharpshooters	Battle of Malvern Hill, Virginia	Jul 1, 1862	At a critical moment brought up two regiments, which he led against the enemy himself, being severely wounded.
—	James S. Roantree	Marine Corps	Sergeant	(United States Marine Corps) USS Oneida	Aboard USS Oneida, Battle of Mobile Bay	Aug 5, 1864	On board USS Oneida during action against rebel forts and gunboats and with the ram Tennessee in Mobile Bay, 5 August 1864.
—	Augustus I. Robbins	Army	Second Lieutenant	Company B, 2nd Vermont Volunteer Infantry Regiment	Battle of Spotsylvania Court House, Virginia	May 12, 1864	While voluntarily serving as a staff officer successfully withdrew a regiment across and around a severely exposed position to the rest of the command; was severely wounded.
—	James Roberts	Navy	Seaman	(United States Navy) USS Agawam	Aboard USS Agawam, First Battle of Fort Fisher	December 23, 1864	Roberts served on board USS Agawam, as one of a volunteer crew of a powder boat which was exploded near Fort Fisher, 23 December 1864.
—	Otis O. Roberts	Army	Sergeant	Company H, 6th Maine Volunteer Infantry	Second Battle of Rappahannock Station, Virginia	Nov 7, 1863	Capture of flag of 8th Louisiana Infantry (C.S.A.) in a hand-to-hand struggle with the color bearer.
Medal of Honor winner Robert Stoddart Robertson	Robert S. Robertson	Army	First Lieutenant	(New York (state)) Company K, 93rd New York Volunteer Infantry	Corbins Bridge, Virginia	May 8, 1864	While acting as aide-de-camp to a general officer, seeing a regiment break to the rear, he seized its colors, rode with them to the front in the face of the advancing enemy, and rallied the retreating regiment.
Head of a square-jawed young white man with a chinstrap beard, wearing a backwards military cap.	Samuel Robertson*	Army	Private	Company G, 33rd Ohio Infantry	Great Locomotive Chase, Georgia	Apr 1862	One of the 19 of 22 men (including 2 civilians) who by direction of General Mitchell (or Buell) penetrated nearly 200 miles south into enemy territory and captured a railroad train at Big Shanty, Georgia, in an attempt to destroy the bridges and tracks between Chattanooga and Atlanta.
Medal of Honor winner George Frank Robie	George F. Robie	Army	Sergeant	Company D, 7th New Hampshire Volunteer Infantry Regiment	before Richmond, Virginia	Sep 1864	Gallantry on the skirmish line.
—	Alexander Robinson	Navy	Boatswain's Mate	(United States Navy) USS Howquah	Aboard USS Howquah	September 25, 1864	Served as boatswain's mate on board USS Howquah on the occasion of the destruction of the blockade runner, Lynx, off Wilmington, 25 September 1864.
—	Charles Robinson	Navy	Boatswain's Mate	(United States Navy) USS Baron DeKalb	Aboard USS Baron DeKalb, Yazoo Pass Expedition	Dec 23, 1862 – Dec 27, 1862	Serving on board USS Baron de Kalb, Yazoo River Expedition, 23 to 27 December 1862.
Medal of Honor winner Elbridge Robinson	Elbridge Robinson	Army	Private	Company C, 122nd Ohio Infantry	Second Battle of Winchester, Virginia	Jun 14, 1863	With one companion, voluntarily went in front of the Union line, under a heavy fire from the enemy, and carried back a helpless, wounded comrade, thus saving him from death or capture.
—	James H. Robinson	Army	Private	Company B, 3rd Michigan Volunteer Cavalry Regiment	Brownsville, Arkansas	Jan 27, 1865	Successfully defended himself, single-handed against 7 guerrillas, killing the leader (Captain W. C. Stephenson) and driving off the remainder of the party.
A white man with a full beard extending down to the center of his chest, wearing a long military jacket. He is standing with one hand behind his back and the other inside his jacket.	John C. Robinson	Army	Brigadier General	(United States) Commander, 2nd Division, V Corps, Army of the Potomac	Laurel Hill, Virginia	May 8, 1864	Placed himself at the head of the leading brigade in a charge upon the enemy's breastworks; was severely wounded.
—	John H. Robinson	Army	Private	Company I, 19th Massachusetts Volunteer Infantry Regiment	Battle of Gettysburg, Pennsylvania	Jul 3, 1863	Capture of flag of 57th Virginia Infantry (C.S.A.).
—	Thomas Robinson	Army	Private	Company H, 81st Pennsylvania Infantry	Battle of Spotsylvania Court House, Virginia	May 12, 1864	Capture of flag in a hand-to-hand conflict.
—	Frederick Rock	Army	Private	Company A, 37th Ohio Infantry	Battle of Vicksburg, Mississippi	May 22, 1863	Gallantry in the charge of the "volunteer storming party."
Medal of Honor winner Charles Mortimer Rockefeller	Charles M. Rockefeller	Army	Lieutenant	(New York (state)) Company A, 178th New York Volunteer Infantry Regiment	Battle of Fort Blakeley, Alabama	Apr 9, 1865	Voluntarily and alone, under a heavy fire, obtained valuable information which a reconnoitering party of 25 men had previously attempted and failed to obtain, suffering severe loss in the attempt.
Head and shoulders of a balding white man with a drooping handlebar mustache and pince-nez glasses. He is wearing a double-breasted military jacket with shoulderboards.	Theophilus F. Rodenbough	Army	Captain	(United States) 2nd U.S. Cavalry Regiment	Battle of Trevilian Station, Virginia	Jun 11, 1864	Handled the regiment with great skill and valor, was severely wounded.
—	Ferdinand F. Rohm	Army	Chief Bugler	16th Pennsylvania Cavalry	Reams Station, Virginia	Aug 25, 1864	While his regiment was retiring under fire voluntarily remained behind to succor a wounded officer who was in great danger, secured assistance, and removed the officer to a place of safety.
—	Oliver P. Rood	Army	Private	Company B, 20th Indiana Infantry Regiment	Battle of Gettysburg, Pennsylvania	Jul 3, 1863	Capture of flag of 21st North Carolina Infantry (C.S.A.).
3 Quarters view of a man with a mustache in civilian attire	George W. Roosevelt	Army	First Sergeant	Company K. 26th Pennsylvania Infantry Regiment	Second Battle of Bull Run, Virginia and Battle of Gettysburg, Pennsylvania	Aug 30, 1862 and Jul 2, 1863	At Bull Run, Virginia, recaptured the colors, which had been seized by the enemy. At Gettysburg captured a Confederate color bearer and color, in which effort he was severely wounded.
Framed portrait of a white man with a full bushy beard, wearing a dark military jacket and holding a tall feathered military hat.	Marion A. Ross*	Army	Sergeant Major	2nd Ohio Infantry	Great Locomotive Chase, Georgia	Apr 1862	Nineteen of 22 men (including 2 civilians) who, by direction of General Mitchell (or Buell), penetrated nearly 200 miles south into the enemy's territory and captured a railroad train at Big Shanty, Georgia, in an attempt to destroy the bridges and track between Chattanooga and Atlanta.
—	Valentine Rossbach	Army	Sergeant	(New York (state)) 34th New York Battery	Spotsylvania, Virginia	May 12, 1864	Encouraged his cannoneers to hold a very dangerous position, and when all depended on several good shots it was from his piece that the most effective were delivered, causing the enemy's fire to cease and thereby relieving the critical position of the Federal troops.
Medal of Honor winner Stephen Rought	Stephen Rought	Army	Sergeant	Company A, 141st Pennsylvania Infantry	Battle of the Wilderness, Virginia	May 6, 1864	Capture of flag of 13th North Carolina Infantry (C.S.A.).
—	Lewis A. Rounds	Army	Private	Company D, 8th Ohio Infantry	Battle of Spotsylvania Court House, Virginia	May 12, 1864	Capture of flag.
—	John Rountry	Navy	First Class Fireman	(United States Navy) USS Montauk	Aboard USS Montauk	September 21, 1864	Served as first class fireman on board USS Montauk, 21 September 1864.
Medal of Honor winner J Levi Roush	J. Levi Roush	Army	Corporal	Company D, 6th Pennsylvania Reserve Regiment	Battle of Gettysburg, Pennsylvania	Jul 2, 1863	Was one of six volunteers who charged upon a log house near the Devil's Den, where a squad of the enemy's sharpshooters were sheltered, and compelled their surrender.
Medal of Honor winner Archibald Hamilton Rowand Jr	Archibald H. Rowand, Jr.	Army	Private	Company K, 1st West Virginia Cavalry	Winter of 1864–65	Was one of two men who succeeded in getting through the enemy's lines with dispatches to General Grant.	
Medal of Honor winner Henry Walker Rowe	Henry W. Rowe	Army	Private	Company I, 11th Regiment New Hampshire Volunteer Infantry	Second Battle of Petersburg, Virginia	Jun 17, 1864	With two companions, he rushed and disarmed 27 enemy pickets, capturing a stand of flags.
Portrait of a white man with a combover and sideburns connected to a mustache, wearing a dark suit.	Charles W. Rundle	Army	Private	Company A, 116th Illinois Volunteer Infantry Regiment	Battle of Vicksburg, Mississippi	May 22, 1863	Gallantry in the charge of the "volunteer storming party."
—	John Rush	Navy	First Class Fireman	(United States Navy) USS Richmond	Aboard USS Richmond, Farragut's attack on Port Hudson	March 14, 1863	Serving on board USS Richmond in the attack on Port Hudson, 14 March 1863.
—	Charles L. Russell	Army	Corporal	(New York (state)) Company H, 93rd New York Volunteer Infantry	Battle of Spotsylvania Court House, Virginia	May 12, 1864	Capture of flag of 42d Virginia Infantry (C.S.A.).
Medal of Honor winner Milton T Russell	Milton Russell	Army	Captain	Company A, 51st Indiana Infantry	Stone River, Tennessee	Dec 29, 1862	Was the first man to cross Stone River and, in the face of a galling fire from the concealed skirmishers of the enemy, led his men up the hillside, driving the opposing skirmishers before them.
Medal of Honor winner John T Rutherford	John T. Rutherford	Army	First Lieutenant	(New York (state)) Company L, 9th New York Volunteer Cavalry Regiment	Battle of Yellow Tavern, Virginia and Hanovertown, Virginia	May 11, 1864 and May 27, 1864	Made a successful charge at Yellow Tavern, Virginia, 11 May 1864, by which 90 prisoners were captured. On 27 May 1864, in a gallant dash on a superior force of the enemy and in a personal encounter, captured his opponent.
Medal of Honor winner James May Rutter	James M. Rutter	Army	Sergeant	Company L, 143rd Pennsylvania Infantry Regiment	Battle of Gettysburg, Pennsylvania	Jul 1, 1863	At great risk of his life went to the assistance of a wounded comrade, and while under fire removed him to a place of safety.
Medal of Honor winner Peter J Ryan	Peter J. Ryan	Army	Private	Company D, 11th Indiana Infantry Regiment	Battle of Opequon, Virginia	Sep 19, 1864	With one companion, captured 14 Confederates in the severest part of the battle.

== S ==
Recipients are listed alphabetically by last name. Posthumous receipt is denoted by an asterisk.

This along with the *, indicates that the Medal of Honor was awarded posthumously

Image	Name	Service	Rank	Unit/Command	Place of action	Date of action	Notes
Medal of Honor winner Louis Jeanolette Sacriste 1885	Louis J. Sacriste	Army	First Lieutenant	Company D, 116th Pennsylvania Infantry	Battle of Chancellorsville, Virginia and Second Battle of Auburn, Virginia	May 3, 1863 and Oct 14, 1863	Saved from capture a gun of the 5th Maine Battery. Voluntarily carried orders which resulted in saving from destruction or capture the picket line of the 1st Division, 2d Army Corps.
—	John C. Sagelhurst	Army	Sergeant	Company B, 1st New Jersey Cavalry	Battle of Hatcher's Run, Virginia	Feb 6, 1865	Under a heavy fire from the enemy carried off the field a commissioned officer who was severely wounded and also led a charge on the enemy's rifle pits.
—	Charles F. Sancrainte	Army	Private	Company B, 15th Michigan Volunteer Infantry Regiment	Battle of Atlanta, Georgia	Jul 22, 1864	Voluntarily scaled the enemy's breastworks and signaled to his commanding officer in charge; also in single combat captured the colors of the 5th Texas Regiment (C.S.A.).
—	Aaron Sanderson	Navy	Landsman	(United States Navy) USS Wyandank	USS Wyandank	March 17, 1865	Served on board USS Wyandank during a boat expedition up Mattox Creek, 17 March 1865. True name "Aaron Anderson".
	William Sands	Army	First Sergeant	Company G, 88th Pennsylvania Infantry	Dabney's Mills, Virginia	Feb 6, 1865 – Feb 7, 1865	Grasped the enemy's colors in the face of a deadly fire and brought them inside the lines.
Medal of Honor winner Jacob Sanford 1893	Jacob Sanford	Army	Private	55th Illinois Volunteer Infantry Regiment	Battle of Vicksburg, Mississippi	May 22, 1863	Gallantry in the charge of the "volunteer storming party."
Medal of Honor winner Jackson George Sargent 1913	Jackson Sargent	Army	Sergeant	Company D, 5th Vermont Volunteer Infantry Regiment	Third Battle of Petersburg, Virginia	Apr 2, 1865	First to scale the enemy's works and plant the colors thereon.
—	Henry Sartwell	Army	Sergeant	(New York (state)) Company D, 123rd New York Volunteer Infantry	Battle of Chancellorsville, Virginia	May 3, 1863	Was severely wounded by a gunshot in his left arm, went half a mile to the rear but insisted on returning to his company and continue to fight bravely until he became exhausted from the loss of blood and was compelled to retire from the field.
—	James Saunders	Navy	Quartermaster	(United States Navy) USS Kearsarge	USS Kearsarge	June 19, 1864	Served as quartermaster on board USS Kearsarge when she destroyed Alabama off Cherbourg, France, 19 June 1864.
—	Edwin F. Savacool*	Army	Captain	(New York (state)) Company K, 1st Regiment New York Volunteer Cavalry ("Lincoln Cavalry")	Battle of Sayler's Creek, Virginia	Apr 6, 1865	Capture of flag, during which he was wounded and died several days later in Washington, D.C.
—	Auzella Savage	Navy	Ordinary Seaman	(United States Navy) USS Santiago de Cuba	Aboard USS Santiago de Cuba at Second Battle of Fort Fisher, North Carolina	Jan 15, 1865	On board USS Santiago de Cuba in the assault on Fort Fisher, 15 January 1865.
A balding white man with a full beard, wearing a long double-breasted military jacket. His right hand is in his jacket and his left is holding a wide-brimmed hat.	Rufus Saxton	Army	Brigadier General	(United States) Department of Maryland	Shenandoah Valley Campaign, Harpers Ferry, (at that time) Virginia	May 26, 1862 – May 30, 1862	Distinguished gallantry and good conduct in the defense.
—	Patrick Scanlan	Army	Private	Company A, 4th Massachusetts Volunteer Cavalry Regiment	Ashepoo River, South Carolina	May 24, 1864	Volunteered as a member of a boat crew which went to the rescue of a large number of Union soldiers on board the stranded steamer Boston, and with great gallantry assisted in conveying them to shore, being exposed during the entire time to a heavy fire from a Confederate battery.
Medal of Honor winner Martin E Scheibner 1913	Martin E. Scheibner	Army	Private	Company G, 90th Pennsylvania Infantry	Battle of Mine Run, Virginia	Nov 27, 1863	Voluntarily extinguished the burning fuse of a shell which had been thrown into the lines of the regiment by the enemy.
—	Benjamin W. Schenck	Army	Private	Company D, 116th Illinois Volunteer Infantry Regiment	Battle of Vicksburg, Mississippi	May 22, 1863	Gallantry in the charge of the "volunteer storming party.
—	John Schiller	Army	Private	(New York (state)) Company E, 158th New York Volunteer Infantry Regiment	Battle of Chaffin's Farm, Virginia	Sep 29, 1864	Advanced to the ditch of the enemy's works.
—	Philipp Schlachter	Army	Private	(New York (state)) Company F, 73rd New York Volunteer Infantry Regiment	Battle of Spotsylvania Court House, Virginia	May 12, 1864	Capture of flag of 15th Louisiana Infantry (C.S.A.).
—	George W. Schmal	Army	Blacksmith	(New York (state)) Company M, 24th Regiment New York Volunteer Cavalry	Paines Crossroads, Virginia	Apr 5, 1865	Capture of flag.
—	Andrew Schmauch	Army	Private	Company A, 30th Ohio Volunteer Infantry	Battle of Vicksburg, Mississippi	May 22, 1863	Gallantry in the charge of the "volunteer storming party."
Conrad Schmidt of the 2nd US Cavalry	Conrad Schmidt	Army	First Sergeant	(United States) Company K, 2nd U.S. Cavalry Regiment	Battle of Opequon, Virginia	Sep 19, 1864	Went to the assistance of his regimental commander, whose horse had been killed under him in a charge, mounted the officer behind him, under a heavy fire from the enemy, and returned him to his command.
—	William Schmidt	Army	Private	Company G, 37th Ohio Volunteer Infantry Regiment	Battle of Missionary Ridge, Tenn.	Nov 25, 1863	Rescued a wounded comrade under terrific fire.
Medal of Honor winner George Schneider 1890	George Schneider	Army	Sergeant	Company G, 3rd Maryland Veteran Infantry	Battle of the Crater, Petersburg, Virginia	Jul 30, 1864	After the color sergeant had been shot down, seized the colors and planted them on the enemy's works during the charge.
—	Christian Schnell	Army	Corporal	Company C, 37th Ohio Infantry	Battle of Vicksburg, Mississippi	May 22, 1863	Gallantry in the charge of the "volunteer storming party."
Head and shoulders of a balding white man with wide sideburns connecting to a mustache. He is wearing a military jacket with shoulderboards and a wide sash across the chest.	John M. Schofield	Army	Major	1st Missouri Volunteer Infantry	Battle of Wilson's Creek, Missouri	Aug 10, 1861	Was conspicuously gallant in leading a regiment in a successful charge against the enemy.
	James M. Schoonmaker	Army	Colonel	14th Pennsylvania Cavalry Regiment	Battle of Opequon, Virginia	Sep 19, 1864	At a critical period, gallantly led a cavalry charge against the left of the enemy's line of battle, drove the enemy out of his works, and captured many prisoners.
—	Charles Schorn	Army	Chief Bugler	Company M, 1st West Virginia Cavalry	Battle of Appomattox Station, Virginia	Apr 8, 1865	Capture of flag of the Sumter Flying Artillery (C.S.A.).
—	Martin Schubert (Medal of Honor)	Army	Private	(New York (state)) Company E, 26th New York Volunteer Infantry Regiment	Battle of Fredericksburg, Virginia	Dec 13, 1862	Relinquished a furlough granted for wounds, entered the battle, where he picked up the colors after several bearers had been killed or wounded, and carried them until himself again wounded.
—	George Schutt	Navy	Coxswain	(United States Navy) USS Hendrick Hudson	USS Hendrick Hudson	Mar 5, 1865 – Mar 6, 1865	As coxswain on board USS Hendrick Hudson, St. Marks, Florida, 5 and 6 March 1865.
Head of a white man with wavy hair and a bushy mustache wearing a military jacket with the letters "U.S.V." on the high, stiff collar.	Theodore Schwan	Army	First Lieutenant	(United States) 10th U.S. Infantry Regiment	Battle of Peebles' Farm, Virginia	Oct 1, 1864	At the imminent risk of his own life, while his regiment was falling back before a superior force of the enemy, he dragged a wounded and helpless officer to the rear, thus saving him from death or capture.
—	Martin Schwenk	Army	Sergeant	(United States) Company B, 6th U.S. Cavalry	Millerstown, Pennsylvania	Jul 1863	Bravery in an attempt to carry a communication through the enemy's lines; also rescued an officer from the hands of the enemy.
—	David H. Scofield	Army	Quartermaster Sergeant	(New York (state)) Company K. 5th Regiment New York Volunteer Cavalry "1st Ira Harris Guard"	Battle of Cedar Creek, Virginia	Oct 19, 1864	Capture of flag of 13th Virginia Infantry (C.S.A.).
Head of a white man with a receding hairline and a bushy mustache hanging over his mouth.	Alexander Scott	Army	Corporal	Company D, 10th Vermont Infantry	Battle of Monocacy Junction, Maryland	Jul 9, 1864	Under a very heavy fire of the enemy saved the national flag of his regiment from capture.
Head of a young white man with a thin mustache and hair pointing straight up from his forehead, wearing a large bowtie.	John Morehead Scott*	Army	Sergeant	Company G, 21st Ohio Infantry	Great Locomotive Chase, Georgia	Apr 1862	One of the 19 of 22 men (including 2 civilians) who, by direction of General Mitchell (or Buell), penetrated nearly 200 miles south into enemy territory and captured a railroad train at Big Shanty, Georgia, and attempted to destroy the bridges and track between Chattanooga and Atlanta.
Bvt. Maj. John Wallace Scott, c. 1903	J. Wallace Scott	Army	Captain	Company F, 21st Ohio Infantry	Battle of Five Forks, Virginia	Apr 1, 1865	Capture of the flag of the 16th South Carolina Infantry, in hand-to-hand combat.
	Julian A. Scott	Army	Drummer	Company E, 3rd Vermont Infantry	Battle of Lee's Mills, Virginia	April 16, 1862	Crossed the creek under a terrific fire of musketry several times to assist in bringing off the wounded.
—	Elisha B. Seaman	Army	Private	Company A, 66th Ohio Infantry	Battle of Chancellorsville, Virginia	May 2, 1863	Was one of party of four who voluntarily brought into the Union lines, under fire, a wounded Confederate officer from whom was obtained valuable information concerning the enemy.
—	James Seanor	Navy	Master at Arms	(United States Navy) USS Chickasaw	USS Chickasaw at Fort Morgan, Battle of Mobile Bay, Alabama	Aug 5, 1864	Served as master-at-arms on board the ironclad USS Chickasaw, Mobile Bay, 5 August 1864.
Medal of Honor winner Cyrus Sears 1903	Cyrus Sears	Army	First Lieutenant	11th Battery, Ohio Light Artillery	Battle of Iuka, Mississippi	Sep 19, 1862	Although severely wounded, fought his battery until the cannoneers and horses were nearly all killed or wounded.
Medal of Honor winner Thomas Orville Seaver 1875	Thomas O. Seaver	Army	Colonel	3rd Vermont Infantry	Battle of Spotsylvania Court House, Virginia	May 10, 1864	At the head of three regiments and under a most galling fire attacked and occupied the enemy's works.
—	James M. Seitzinger	Army	Private	Company G, 116th Pennsylvania Infantry	Battle of Cold Harbor, Virginia	Jun 3, 1864	When the color bearer was shot down, this soldier seized the colors and bore them gallantly in a charge against the enemy.
Medal of Honor winner Alfred Jacob Sellers 1865	Alfred J. Sellers	Army	Major	90th Pennsylvania Infantry	Battle of Gettysburg, Pennsylvania	Jul 1, 1863	Voluntarily led the regiment under a withering fire to a position from which the enemy was repulsed.
—	Charles H. Seston*	Army	Sergeant	Company I, 11th Indiana Infantry	Battle of Opequon, Virginia	Sep 19, 1864	Gallant and meritorious service in carrying the regimental colors.
—	Richard H. Seward (Note: Seward's name was incorrectly listed as "Richard E. Seward" on his citation.)	Navy	Paymaster's Steward	(United States Navy) USS Commodore	USS Commodore	November 23, 1863	Recovered the bodies of two soldiers despite heavy fire
	William J. Sewell	Army	Colonel	5th New Jersey Volunteer Infantry	Battle of Chancellorsville, Virginia	May 3, 1863	For assuming command of the brigade, rallying the troops, and remaining in command though wounded.
Head and shoulders of a white man with hair parted in the center and a mustache, wearing a dark suit and tie.	William R. Shafter	Army	First Lieutenant	Company I, 7th Michigan Infantry	Battle of Fair Oaks, Virginia	May 31, 1862	Remained in battle despite having been wounded.
—	Emisire Shahan	Army	Corporal	Company A, 1st West Virginia Cavalry	Battle of Sayler's Creek, Virginia	Apr 6, 1865	Capture of flag of 76th Georgia Infantry (C.S.A.).
A white man with a long drooping mustache	Alexander Shaler	Army	Colonel	(New York (state)) 65th New York Volunteer Infantry	Marye's Heights, Virginia	May 3, 1863	As a charging column was about to be crushed by artillery and infantry fire, he pushed forward with a supporting column, pierced the enemy's works, and turned their flank.
—	Charles Shambaugh	Army	Corporal	Company D, 11th Pennsylvania Reserve Regiment	Charles City Crossroads, Virginia	Jun 30, 1862	Capture of flag.
Medal of Honor winner John Shanes 1875	John Shanes	Army	Private	Company K, 14th West Virginia Volunteer Infantry Regiment	Battle of Rutherford's Farm, Virginia	Jul 20, 1864	Charged upon a Confederate fieldpiece in advance of his comrades and by his individual exertions silenced the piece.
Medal of Honor winner John Shapland 1913	John Shapland	Army	Private	Company D, 104th Illinois Infantry Regiment	Elk River, Tennessee	Jul 2, 1863	Voluntarily joined a small party that, under a heavy fire, captured a stockade and saved the bridge.
—	Hendrick Sharp	Navy	Seaman	(United States Navy) USS Richmond	USS Richmond, Fort Morgan, Battle of Mobile Bay, Alabama	Aug 5, 1864	As captain of a 100-pounder rifle gun on topgallant forecastle on board USS Richmond during action against rebel forts and gunboats and with the ram Tennessee in Mobile Bay, 5 August 1864.
—	Joseph H. Shea	Army	Private	(New York (state)) Company K, 92nd New York Volunteer Infantry	Battle of Chaffin's Farm, Virginia	Sep 29, 1864	Gallantry in bringing wounded from the field under heavy fire.
—	John S. Shellenberger	Army	Corporal	Company B, 85th Pennsylvania Infantry	Deep Run, Virginia	Aug 16, 1864	Capture of flag
Medal of Honor winner Irwin Shepard 1913	Irwin Shepard	Army	Corporal	Company E, 17th Michigan Infantry	Knoxville, Tennessee	Nov 20, 1863	Having voluntarily accompanied a small party to destroy buildings within the enemy's lines, whence sharpshooters had been firing, disregarded an order to retire, remained and completed the firing of the buildings, thus insuring their total destruction; this at the imminent risk of his life from the fire of the advancing enemy.
Portrait of a man with a very wide mustache, wearing a jacket and tie with a medal pinned to the left breast. Around the portrait is decorative frame and a sketch of sailing ships.	Louis C. Shepard	Navy	Ordinary Seaman	(United States Navy) USS Wabash	USS Wabash Second Battle of Fort Fisher, North Carolina	Jan 15, 1865	USS Wabash (1855) Served as seaman on board USS Wabash in the assault on Fort Fisher, 15 January 1865.
—	William Shepherd	Army	Private	Company A, 3rd Indiana Cavalry	Battle of Sayler's Creek, Virginia	Apr 6, 1865	Capture of flag.
—	James Sheridan	Navy	Quartermaster	(United States Navy) USS Oneida	USS Oneida Fort Morgan, Battle of Mobile Bay, Alabama	Aug 5, 1864	Served as quartermaster on board USS Oneida in the engagement at Mobile Bay 5 August 1864.
Medal of Honor winner Marshall Sherman 1867	Marshall Sherman	Army	Private	Company C, 1st Minnesota Infantry	Gettysburg, Pennsylvania	July 3, 1863	Capture of flag of 28th Virginia Infantry (C.S.A.).
—	John Shiel	Army	Corporal	Company E, 90th Pennsylvania Infantry	Battle of Fredericksburg, Virginia	Dec 13, 1862	Last name sometimes spelled "Shields"
—	Bernard Shields	Army	Private	Company E, 2nd West Virginia Volunteer Cavalry Regiment	Battle of Appomattox Station, Virginia	Apr 8, 1865	Capture of flag of the Washington Artillery (C.S.A.).
Medal of Honor winner John Shilling 1865	John Shilling	Army	First Sergeant	Company H, 3rd Delaware Infantry Regiment	Battle of Globe Tavern, Virginia	Aug 21, 1864	Capture of flag.
Medal of Honor winner Robert Frank Shipley 1865	Robert F. Shipley	Army	Sergeant	(New York (state)) Company A, 140th New York Volunteer Infantry Regiment	Battle of Five Forks, Virginia	Apr 1, 1865	Captured the flag of the 9th Virginia Infantry (C.S.A.) in hand-to-hand combat.
—	William Shipman	Navy	Coxswain	(United States Navy) USS Ticonderoga	USS Ticonderoga Second Battle of Fort Fisher, North Carolina	Jan 15, 1865	On board USS Ticonderoga in the attack upon Fort Fisher on 15 January 1865.
—	John Shivers	Marine Corps	Private	(United States Marine Corps) USS Minnesota	USS Minnesota Second Battle of Fort Fisher, North Carolina	Jan 15, 1865	On board USS Minnesota, in the assault on Fort Fisher, 15 January 1865.
—	Levi Shoemaker	Army	Sergeant	Company A, 1st West Virginia Cavalry	Nineveh, Virginia	Nov 12, 1864	Capture of flag of 22d Virginia Cavalry (C.S.A.).
—	George J. Shopp	Army	Private	Company E, 191st Pennsylvania Infantry	Battle of Five Forks, Virginia	Apr 1, 1865	Capture of flag.
—	Frank Shubert	Army	Sergeant	(New York (state)) Company E, 43rd New York Volunteer Infantry Regiment	Third Battle of Petersburg, Virginia	Apr 2, 1865	Capture of two markers.
—	Henry Shutes	Navy	Captain of the Forecastle	(United States Navy) USS Wissahickon	USS Wissahickon	Apr 1862 and Feb 27, 1863	Served as captain of the forecastle on board USS Wissahickon during the battle of New Orleans, 24 and 25 April 1862; and in the engagement at Fort McAllister, 27 February 1863.
Head and torso of a white man with a pointed mustache and bags under his eyes, wearing a double-breasted military jacket with a rectangular patch over each shoulder.	Daniel E. Sickles	Army	Major General	(United States) U.S. Volunteers	Battle of Gettysburg, Pennsylvania	Jul 2, 1863	Displayed most conspicuous gallantry on the field vigorously contesting the advance of the enemy and continuing to encourage his troops after being himself severely wounded.
Medal of Honor winner William H Sickles 1913	William Sickles	Army	Sergeant	Company B, 7th Wisconsin Infantry	Gravelly Run, Virginia	Mar 31, 1865	With a comrade, attempted capture of a stand of Confederate colors and detachment of 9 Confederates, actually taking prisoner 3 members of the detachment, dispersing the remainder, and recapturing a Union officer who was a prisoner in hands of the detachment.
Medal of Honor winner George Dallas Sidman 1865	George D. Sidman	Army	Private	Company C, 16th Michigan Infantry	Battle of Gaines' Mill, Virginia	Jun 27, 1862	Distinguished bravery in battle. Rallied his comrades to charge vastly superior force until wounded in the hip. He was a 16-year-old drummer.
—	Lebbeus Simkins	Navy	Coxswain	(United States Navy) USS Richmond	USS Richmond Fort Morgan, Battle of Mobile Bay, Alabama	Aug 5, 1864	On board USS Richmond during action against rebel forts and gunboats and with the ram Tennessee in Mobile Bay, 5 August 1864.
—	John Simmons	Army	Private	(New York (state)) Company D, 2nd New York Volunteer Heavy Artillery Regiment	Battle of Sayler's Creek, Virginia	Apr 6, 1865	Capture of flag.
Medal of Honor winner William Thomas Simmons 1875	William T. Simmons	Army	Lieutenant	Company C, 11th Missouri Volunteer Infantry Regiment	Battle of Nashville, Tenn.	Dec 16, 1864	Capture of flag of 34th Alabama Infantry (C.S.A ). Being the first to enter the works, he shot and wounded the enemy color bearer.
	William E. Simonds	Army	Sergeant Major	25th Connecticut Infantry Regiment	Irish Bend, Louisiana	Apr 14, 1863	Displayed great gallantry, under a heavy fire from the enemy, in calling in the skirmishers and assisting in forming the line of battle.
Medal of Honor winner Charles Jenks Simons c1900	Charles J. Simons	Army	Sergeant	Company A, 9th New Hampshire Volunteer Infantry Regiment	Battle of the Crater, Petersburg, Virginia	Jul 30, 1864	Was one of the first in the exploded mine, captured a number of prisoners. and was himself captured, but escaped.
Medal of Honor winner Ebenezer Skellie 1895	Ebenezer Skellie	Army	Corporal	(New York (state)) Company D, 112th New York Volunteer Infantry	Battle of Chaffin's Farm, Virginia	Sep 29, 1864	Took the colors of his regiment, the color bearer having fallen, and carried them through the first charge; also, in the second charge, after all the color guards had been killed or wounded he carried the colors up to the enemy's works, where he fell wounded.
Medal of Honor winner Joseph Alton Sladen MD 1872	Joseph A. Sladen	Army	Private	Company A, 33rd Massachusetts Volunteer Infantry Regiment	Battle of Resaca, Georgia	May 14, 1864	While detailed as clerk at headquarters, voluntarily engaged in action at a critical moment and personal example inspired the troops to repel the enemy.
—	Oscar Slagle	Army	Private	Company D, 104th Illinois Volunteer Infantry Regiment	Elk River, Tennessee	Jul 2, 1863	Voluntarily joined a small party that, under a heavy fire, captured a stockade and saved the bridge.
Head of a heavy-set white man with a beard and pointed mustache, wearing a military jacket.	Samuel Slavens*	Army	Private	Company E, 33rd Ohio Infantry	Great Locomotive Chase, Georgia	Apr 1862	One of the 19 of 22 men (including 2 civilians) who, by direction of General Mitchell (or Buell), penetrated nearly 200 miles south into enemy territory and captured a railroad train at Big Shanty, Georgia, in an attempt to destroy the bridges and track between Chattanooga and Atlanta.
—	Andrew J. Sloan	Army	Private	Company H, 12th Iowa Volunteer Infantry Regiment	Battle of Nashville, Tennessee	Dec 16, 1864	Captured flag of 1st Louisiana Battery (C.S.A.).
Medal of Honor winner Henry Craig Slusher 1865	Henry C. Slusher	Army	Private	Company F, 22nd Pennsylvania Cavalry Regiment	Near Moorefield, West Virginia	Sep 11, 1863	Voluntarily crossed a branch of the Potomac River under fire to rescue a wounded comrade held prisoner by the enemy. Was wounded and taken prisoner in the attempt.
Medal of Honor winner Reuben Smalley 1865	Reuben Smalley	Army	Private	Company F, 22nd Pennsylvania Cavalry Regiment	Battle of Vicksburg, Mississippi	May 22, 1863	Gallantry in the charge of the "volunteer storming party."
—	Reuben S. Smalley	Army	Private	Company F, 83rd Indiana Infantry Regiment	Elk River, Tennessee	Jul 2, 1863	Voluntarily joined a small party that, under a heavy fire, captured a stockade and saved the bridge.
Medal of Honor winner Alonzo Smith 1862	Alonzo Smith	Army	Sergeant	Company C, 7th Michigan Volunteer Infantry Regiment	Battle of Boydton Plank Road, Petersburg, Virginia	Oct 27, 1864	Capture of flag of 26th North Carolina Infantry (C.S.A.), while outside his lines far from his comrades.
A young black man wearing a tilted forage cap and a long military jacket with a belt, a wide leather strap across the chest, and three chevrons on each sleeve. His right hand is holding a sword vertically.	Andrew J. Smith*	Army	Corporal	55th Massachusetts Volunteer Infantry Regiment	Battle of Honey Hill, South Carolina	Nov 30, 1864	For taking up the regimental colors after the color bearer was killed
Charles Henry Smith of Hollis, ME. Army MOH winner 1865	Charles Henry Smith	Army	Colonel	1st Maine Volunteer Cavalry Regiment	St. Mary's Church, Virginia	Jun 24, 1864	Remained in the fight to the close, although severely wounded.
—	Charles H. Smith	Navy	Coxswain	(United States Navy) USS Rhode Island	USS Rhode Island	Dec 30, 1862	On board USS Rhode Island which was engaged in rescuing men from the stricken Monitor in Mobile Bay, on December 30, 1862.
—	David L. Smith	Army	Sergeant	(New York (state)) Battery E, 1st New York Light Artillery	Warwick Courthouse, Virginia	April 6, 1862	This soldier, when a shell struck an ammunition chest exploding a number of cartridges and setting fire to the packing tow, procured water and extinguished the fire, thus preventing the explosion of the remaining ammunition.
—	Edwin Smith	Navy	Ordinary Seaman	(United States Navy) USS Whitehead	USS Whitehead	October 3, 1862	On board USS Whitehead in the attack upon Franklin, Virginia, 3 October 1862.
Medal of Honor winner Francis M Smith GAR 1913	Francis M. Smith	Army	First Lieutenant and Adjutant	1st Maryland Volunteer Infantry Regiment	Dabney Mills, Virginia	Feb 6, 1865	Voluntarily remained with the body of his regimental commander under a heavy fire after the brigade had retired and brought the body off the field.
Medal of Honor winner Henry Irving Smith 1865	Henry I. Smith	Army	First Lieutenant	Company B, 7th Iowa Volunteer Infantry Regiment	Black River, North Carolina	Mar 15, 1865	Voluntarily and under fire rescued a comrade from death by drowning.
—	James Smith	Army	Private	Company I, 2nd Ohio Infantry	Great Locomotive Chase, Georgia	Apr 1862	One of the 19 of 22 men (including 2 civilians) who, by direction of General Mitchell (or Buell), penetrated nearly 200 miles south into enemy territory and captured a railroad train at Big Shanty, Georgia, in an attempt to destroy the bridges and tract between Chattanooga and Atlanta.
—	James Smith	Navy	Captain of the Forecastle	(United States Navy) USS Richmond	USS Richmond Fort Morgan, Battle of Mobile Bay, Alabama	Aug 5, 1864	As captain of a gun on board USS Richmond during action against rebel forts and gunboats and with the ram Tennessee, in Mobile Bay, 5 August 1864.
—	John Smith	Navy	Captain of Forecastle	(United States Navy) USS Lackawanna	USS Lackawanna, Fort Morgan, Battle of Mobile Bay, Alabama	Aug 5, 1864	On board USS Lackawanna during the successful attacks against Fort Morgan, rebel gunboats and the ram Tennessee in Mobile Bay, 5 August 1864.
—	John Smith	Navy	Second Captain of the Top	(United States Navy) USS Richmond	USS RichmondFort Morgan, Battle of Mobile Bay, Alabama	Aug 5, 1864	As captain of a gun on board USS Richmond during action against rebel forts and gunboats and with the ram Tennessee in Mobile Bay, 5 August 1864.
	Joseph S. Smith	Army	Lieutenant Colonel and Commissary of Subsistence	(United States) II Corps, Army of the Potomac	Battle of Boydton Plank Road, Petersburg, Virginia	Oct 27, 1864	Led a part of a brigade, saved 2 pieces of artillery, captured a flag, and secured a number of prisoners.
—	Oloff Smith	Navy	Coxswain	(United States Navy) USS Richmond	USS Richmond Fort Morgan, Battle of Mobile Bay, Alabama	Aug 5, 1864	On board USS Richmond during action against rebel forts and gunboats and with the ram Tennessee in Mobile Bay, 5 August 1864
Medal of Honor winner Otis W Smith 1920	Otis W. Smith	Army	Private	Company G, 95th Ohio Infantry	Battle of Nashville, Tennessee	Dec 16, 1864	Capture of flag of 6th Florida Infantry (C.S.A.).
Medal of Honor winner Richard Smith GAR 1913	Richard Smith	Army	Private	(New York (state)) Company B, 95th New York Volunteer Infantry	Battle of Globe Tavern, Virginia	Aug 21, 1864	Captured 2 officers and 20 men of Hagood's brigade while they were endeavoring to make their way back through the woods.
Medal of Honor winner Samuel Rodmond Smith 1865	S. Rodmond Smith	Army	Captain	Company C, 4th Delaware Infantry Regiment	Rowanty Creek, Virginia	Feb 5, 1865	Swam the partly frozen creek under fire to establish a crossing.
—	Thaddeus S. Smith	Army	Corporal	Company E, 6th Pennsylvania Reserve Regiment	Gettysburg, Pennsylvania	July 2, 1863	Was one of six volunteers who charged upon a log house near the Devil's Den, where a squad of the enemy's sharpshooters were sheltered, and compelled their surrender.
—	Thomas Smith	Navy	Seaman	(United States Navy) USS Magnolia	USS Magnolia	Mar 5, 1865 – Mar 6, 1865	As seaman on board USS Magnolia, St. Marks, Florida, 5 and 6 March 1865.
—	Walter B. Smith	Navy	Ordinary Seaman	(United States Navy) USS Richmond	USS Richmond Fort Morgan, Battle of Mobile Bay, Alabama	Aug 5, 1864	On board USS Richmond during action against rebel forts and gunboats and with the ram Tennessee in Mobile Bay, 5 August 1864.
—	Willard M. Smith	Marine Corps	Corporal	(United States Marine Corps) USS Brooklyn	USS Brooklyn Fort Morgan, Battle of Mobile Bay, Alabama	Aug 5, 1864	On board USS Brooklyn during action against rebel forts and gunboats, and with the ram Tennessee in Mobile Bay, 5 August 1864.
	William Smith	Navy	Quartermaster	(United States Navy) USS Kearsarge	USS Kearsarge	June 19, 1864	Served as second quartermaster on board USS Kearsarge when she destroyed Alabama off Cherbourg, France, 19 June 1864.
Medal of Honor winner Wilson Smith 1875	Wilson Smith	Army	Corporal	(New York (state)) Battery H, 3rd New York Light Artillery	Washington, North Carolina	Sep 6, 1862	Took command of a gun (the lieutenant in charge having disappeared) and fired the same so rapidly and effectively that the enemy was repulsed, although for a time a hand-to-hand conflict was fought over the gun.
Medal of Honor winner James Snedden GAR 1913	James Snedden	Army	Musician	Company E, 54th Pennsylvania Infantry	Piedmont, Virginia	Jun 5, 1864	Left his place in the rear, took the rifle of a disabled soldier, and fought through the remainder of the action.
—	David Southard	Army	Sergeant	Company C, 1st New Jersey Cavalry	Deatonsville (Sailor's Creek), Virginia	Apr 6, 1865	Capture of flag; and was the first man over the works in the charge.
—	Joseph E. Sova	Army	Saddler	(New York (state)) Company H, 8th New York Volunteer Cavalry Regiment	Appomattox Campaign, Virginia	Mar 29, 1865 – Apr 9, 1865	Capture of flag.
Medal of Honor winner Michael Sowers 1864	Michael Sowers	Army	Private	Company L, 4th Pennsylvania Cavalry	Stony Creek Station, Virginia	Dec 1, 1864	His horse having been shot from under him he voluntarily and on foot participated in the cavalry charge made upon one of the forts, conducting himself throughout with great personal bravery.
Medal of Honor winner Edward Burson Spalding 1885	Edward B. Spalding	Army	Sergeant	Company E, 52nd Illinois Infantry Regiment	Battle of Shiloh, Tennessee	Apr 6, 1862	Although twice wounded, and thereby crippled for life, he remained fighting in open ground to the close of the battle.
Medal of Honor winner William Joseph Sperry 1865	William J. Sperry	Army	Major	6th Vermont Infantry	Third Battle of Petersburg, Virginia	Apr 2, 1865	With the assistance of a few men, captured 2 pieces of artillery and turned them upon the enemy.
—	Timothy Spillane	Army	Private	Company C, 16th Pennsylvania Cavalry	Battle of Hatcher's Run, Virginia	Feb 5, 1865 – Feb 7, 1865	Gallantry and good conduct in action; bravery in a charge and reluctance to leave the field after being twice wounded.
Medal of Honor winner Benona Sprague c1900	Benona Sprague	Army	Corporal	Company F, 116th Illinois Volunteer Infantry Regiment	Battle of Vicksburg, Mississippi	May 22, 1863	Gallantry in the charge of the "volunteer storming party."
Head and torso of a white man with thick wavy hair and a full beard, wearing a double-breasted military jacket with a rectangular patch on each shoulder.	John W. Sprague	Army	Colonel	63rd Ohio Infantry Regiment	Decatur, Georgia	Jul 22, 1864	With a small command defeated an overwhelming force of the enemy and saved the trains of the corps.
—	David Sprowle	Marine Corps	Orderly Sergeant	(United States Marine Corps) USS Richmond (1860)	USS Richmond (1860) Fort Morgan, Battle of Mobile Bay, Alabama	Aug 5, 1864	On board USS Richmond (1860) during action against rebel forts and gunboats, and with the ram Tennessee in Mobile Bay, 5 August 1864.
Medal of Honor winner Andrew Barclay Spurling 1865	Andrew B. Spurling	Army	Lieutenant Colonel	2nd Maine Volunteer Cavalry	Evergreen, Alabama	Mar 23, 1865	Advanced alone in the darkness beyond the picket line, came upon three of the enemy, fired upon them (his fire being returned), wounded two, and captured the whole party.
	Charles Stacey	Army	Private	Company D, 55th Ohio Infantry	Battle of Gettysburg, Pennsylvania	Jul 2, 1863	Voluntarily took an advanced position on the skirmish line for the purpose of ascertaining the location of Confederate sharpshooters, and under heavy fire held the position thus taken until the company of which he was a member went back to the main line.
A man with curly hair and a Van Dyke mustache, wearing a forage cap, a long double-breasted jacket with belt, white gloves, and a coat hanging over his right shoulder. His left hand is holding a sword.	Julius Stahel	Army	Major General	(United States) 2nd Division, Army of the Shenandoah	Piedmont, Virginia	Jun 5, 1864	Led his division into action until he was severely wounded.
Head and shoulders of a white man with a full beard, wearing a double-breasted military jacket with a rectangular patch over each shoulder.	David S. Stanley	Army	Major General	(United States) IV Corps, Army of the Ohio	Second Battle of Franklin, Tennessee	Nov 30, 1864	At a critical moment rode to the front of one of his brigades, reestablished its lines, and gallantly led it In a successful assault.
—	William A. Stanley	Navy	Shell Man	(United States Navy) USS Hartford	USS HartfordFort Morgan, Battle of Mobile Bay, Alabama	Aug 5, 1864	Shell man on No. 8 on board USS Hartford during successful actions against Fort Morgan, rebel gunboats and the ram Tennessee in Mobile Bay, on 5 August 1864.
—	John H. Starkins	Army	Sergeant	(New York (state)) 34th New York Battery	Campbell Station, Tennessee	Nov 16, 1863	Brought off his piece without losing a man.
Medal of Honor winner John Whedon Steele 1865	John W. Steele	Army	Major and Aide de Camp	(United States) Army of the Ohio	Spring Hill, Tenn.	Nov 29, 1864	During a night attack of the enemy upon the wagon and ammunition train of this officer's corps, he gathered up a force of stragglers and others, assumed command of it, though himself a staff officer, and attacked and dispersed the enemy's forces, thus saving the train.
—	William Steinmetz	Army	Private	Company G, 83rd Indiana Infantry Regiment	Battle of Vicksburg, Mississippi	May 22, 1863	Gallantry in the charge of the "volunteer storming party."
—	William G. Stephens	Army	Private	Chicago Mercantile Battery, Illinois Light Artillery	Battle of Vicksburg, Mississippi	May 22, 1863	Carried with others by hand a cannon up to and fired it through an embrasure of the enemy's works.
—	James E. Sterling	Navy	Coal Heaver	(United States Navy) USS Brooklyn	USS Brooklyn Fort Morgan, Battle of Mobile Bay, Alabama	Aug 5, 1864	On board USS Brooklyn during successful attacks against Fort Morgan, rebel gunboats and the ram Tennessee in Mobile Bay, on 5 August 1864.
—	John T. Sterling	Army	Private	Company D, 11th Indiana Infantry	Battle of Opequon, Virginia	Sep 19, 1864	With one companion captured 14 of the enemy in the severest part of the battle.
Head of a white man with a bushy goatee and thinning hair, wearing a dark suit coat and tie.	Daniel D. Stevens	Navy	Quartermaster	(United States Navy) USS Canonicus	USS Canonicus Second Battle of Fort Fisher, North Carolina	Jan 13, 1865	Onboard USS Canonicus, for twice replacing his ship's flag after it had been shot away by heavy enemy fire.
Head and shoulders of a white man with a full beard, wearing a dark suit coat, vest, and bow tie.	Hazard Stevens	Army	Captain and Assistant Adjutant General	(New York (state)) 79th New York Volunteer Infantry	Battle of Fort Huger, Virginia	Apr 19, 1863	Gallantly led a party that assaulted and captured the fort.
—	George W. Stewart	Army	First Sergeant	Company E, 1st New Jersey Cavalry	Paines Crossroads, Virginia	Apr 5, 1865	Capture of flag.
—	Joseph Stewart	Army	Private	Company G, 1st Maryland Infantry Regiment (Union)	Five Forks, Virginia	April 1, 1865	Capture of flag.
—	Joseph Stickels	Army	Sergeant	Company A, 83rd Ohio Infantry	Fort Blakely, Alabama	April 9, 1865	Capture of flag.
Medal of Honor winner George Henry Stockman 1865	George H. Stockman	Army	First Lieutenant	Company C, 6th Missouri Volunteer Infantry Regiment	Battle of Vicksburg, Mississippi	May 22, 1863	Gallantry in the charge of the "volunteer storming party."
—	James Stoddard	Navy	Seaman	(United States Navy) USS Marmora	Aboard USS Marmora, off Yazoo City, Mississippi	March 5, 1864	Disembarking from USS Marmora with a 12-pound howitzer mounted on a field carriage, Stoddard landed with the gun and crew in the midst of heated battle and, bravely standing by his gun despite enemy rifle fire which cut the gun carriage and rammer, contributed to the turning back of the enemy during the fierce engagement.
—	George Stokes	Army	Private	Company C, 122nd Illinois Infantry Regiment	Battle of Nashville, Tennessee	Dec 16, 1864	Capture of flag.
Medal of Honor winner Frank Stolz 1875	Frank Stolz	Army	Private	Company G, 83rd Indiana Volunteer Infantry Regiment	Battle of Vicksburg, Mississippi	May 22, 1863	Gallantry in the charge of the "volunteer storming party."
Medal of Honor winner John Hamilton Reid Storey 1896	John H. R. Storey	Army	Sergeant	Company F, 109th Pennsylvania Infantry	Dallas, Georgia	May 28, 1864	While bringing in a wounded comrade, under a destructive fire, he was himself wounded in the right leg, which was amputated on the same day.
Head of a balding white man with a mustache, wearing a dark suit coat and bow tie. The portrait is surrounded by a decorative frame and a drawing of a sailing ship at sea.	Richard Stout	Navy	Landsman	(United States Navy) USS Isaac Smith	USS Isaac Smith	January 30, 1863	Serving on board USS Isaac Smith, Stono River, 30 January 1863. While reconnoitering on the Stono River on this date USS Isaac Smith became trapped in a rebel ambush.
—	Robert Strahan	Navy	Captain of the Top	(United States Navy) USS Kearsarge	USS Kearsarge	June 19, 1864	Served as captain of the top on board USS Kearsarge when she destroyed Alabama off Cherbourg, France, 19 June 1864.
—	Bernard A. Strausbaugh	Army	First Sergeant	Company A, 3rd Maryland Infantry Regiment	Second Battle of Petersburg, Virginia	Jun 17, 1864	Recaptured the colors of 2d Pennsylvania Provisional Artillery.
—	Christian Streile	Army	Private	Company I, 1st New Jersey Cavalry Regiment	Paines Crossroads, Virginia	Apr 5, 1865	Capture of flag.
—	James N. Strong	Army	Sergeant	Company C, 49th Massachusetts Infantry Regiment	Port Hudson, Louisiana	May 27, 1863	Volunteered in response to a call and took part in the movement that was made upon the enemy's works under a heavy fire therefrom in advance of the general assault.
Medal of Honor winner James Knox Sturgeon 1885	James K. Sturgeon	Army	Private	Company F, 46th Ohio Infantry	Kenesaw Mountain, Georgia	Jun 15, 1864	Advanced beyond the lines, and in an encounter with three Confederates, shot two and took the other prisoner.
—	James Sullivan	Navy	Ordinary Seaman	(United States Navy) USS Agawam	USS Agawam Battle of Fort Fisher, North Carolina	December 2, 1864	On board USS Agawam as one of a volunteer crew of a powder boat which was exploded near Fort Fisher, 2 December 1864.
—	John Sullivan	Navy	Seaman	(United States Navy) USS Monticello	USS Monticello	Jun 23, 1864 – Jun 25, 1864	Served as seaman on board USS Monticello during the reconnaissance of the harbor and water defenses of Wilmington, North Carolina 23 to 25 June 1864.
—	Timothy Sullivan	Navy	Coxswain	(United States Navy) USS Louisville	USS Louisville	Various	Served on board USS Louisville during various actions of that vessel. During the engagements of Louisville, Sullivan served as first captain of a 9-inch gun and throughout his period of service was "especially commended for his attention to duty, bravery, and coolness in action."
—	James C. Summers	Army	Private	Company H, 4th West Virginia Infantry Regiment	Battle of Vicksburg, Mississippi	May 22, 1863	Gallantry in charge of the "volunteer storming party."
Medal of Honor winner Robert Emil Summers GAR 1913	Robert Summers	Navy	Chief Quartermaster	(United States Navy) USS Ticonderoga	USS Ticonderoga Second Battle of Fort Fisher, North Carolina	Jan 15, 1865	Summers served on board USS Ticonderoga in the attacks on Fort Fisher, 13 to 15 January 1865.
Medal of Honor winner William H Surles 1885	William H. Surles	Army	Private	Company G, 2nd Ohio Infantry	Perryville, Kentucky	Oct 8, 1862	In the hottest part of the fire he stepped in front of his colonel to shield him from the enemy's fire.
—	Charles A. Swan	Army	Private	Company K, 4th Iowa Cavalry	Selma, Alabama	April 2, 1865	Capture of flag supposed to be 11th Mississippi, C.S.A., and bearer.
—	John Swanson	Navy	Seaman	(United States Navy) USS Santiago de Cuba	USS Santiago de Cuba Second Battle of Fort Fisher, North Carolina	Jan 15, 1865	On board USS Santiago de Cuba during the assault on Fort Fisher on 15 January 1865.
Medal of Honor winner Jacob E Swap GAR 1900	Jacob E. Swap	Army	Private	Company H, 83rd Pennsylvania Infantry	Battle of the Wilderness, Virginia	May 5, 1864	Although assigned to other duty, he voluntarily joined his regiment in a charge and fought with it until severely wounded.
—	Edward Swatton	Navy	Seaman	(United States Navy) USS Santiago de Cuba	USS Santiago de Cuba Second Battle of Fort Fisher, North Carolina	Jan 15, 1865	On board USS Santiago de Cuba during the assault on Fort Fisher on 15 January 1865.
Head and torso of a balding white man with a Van Dyke beard and mustache, sitting in a chair with his left arm lying on the arm rest. He is wearing a dark double-breasted military jacket.	Wager Swayne	Army	Lieutenant Colonel	43rd Ohio Infantry	Second Battle of Corinth, Mississippi	Oct 4, 1862	Conspicuous gallantry in restoring order at a critical moment and leading his regiment in a charge.
Head and shoulders of a white man with a bushy white beard, wearing a dark suit coat and wide-brimmed hat. The portrait is in a decorative frame featuring a bird's wing and stars and stripes.	Benjamin Swearer	Navy	Seaman	(United States Navy) USS Pawnee	USS Pawnee	August 29, 1861	Embarked in a surfboat from USS Pawnee during action against Fort Clark, off Baltimore Inlet, 29 August 1861.
Medal of Honor winner Joseph Sewell-Gerrish Sweatt GAR 1913	Joseph S. G. Sweatt	Army	Private	Company C, 6th Massachusetts Volunteer Militia	Carrsville, Virginia	May 15, 1863	When ordered to retreat this soldier turned and rushed back to the front, in the face of heavy fire of the enemy, in an endeavor to rescue his wounded comrades, remaining by them until overpowered and taken prisoner.
—	James Sweeney	Army	Private	Company A, 1st Vermont Cavalry	Battle of Cedar Creek, Virginia	Oct 19, 1864	With one companion captured the State flag of a North Carolina regiment, together with three officers and an ambulance with its mules and driver.
Medal of Honor winner Jacob Swegheimer GAR 1913	Jacob Swegheimer	Army	Private	Company I, 54th Ohio Infantry	Battle of Vicksburg, Mississippi	May 22, 1863	Gallantry in the charge of the "volunteer storming party."
—	Frederick W. Swift	Army	Lieutenant Colonel	17th Michigan Infantry	Lenoire Station, Tennessee	Nov 16, 1863	Gallantly seized the colors and rallied the regiment after three color bearers had been shot and the regiment, having become demoralized, was in imminent danger of capture.
—	Harlan J. Swift	Army	Second Lieutenant	(New York (state)) Company H, 2nd New York Militia Regiment	Battle of the Crater, Petersburg, Virginia	Jul 30, 1864	Having advanced with his regiment and captured the enemy's line, saw four of the enemy retiring toward their second line of works. He advanced upon them alone, compelled their surrender and regained his regiment with the four prisoners.
—	Peter Sype	Army	Private	Company B, 47th Ohio Infantry	Battle of Vicksburg, Mississippi	May 3, 1863	Was one of a party that volunteered and attempted to run the enemy's batteries with a steam tug and 2 barges loaded with subsistence stores.

== See also ==
- List of Medal of Honor recipients
