= William Raymond =

William Raymond may refer to:

- William Forbes Raymond (1785–1860), Archdeacon of Northumberland
- William H. Raymond (1844–1916), American soldier and Medal of Honor recipient
- William Gawtress Raymond (1855–1942), member of the House of Commons of Canada
- Bill Raymond (born 1938), American actor
- William Gould Raymond (1819–1893), American pastor, chaplain and soldier
- William O. Raymond (1853–1923), Canadian clergyman and historian
