= Andrew Sloan =

Andrew Sloan may refer to:

- Andrew Sloan (politician) (1845–1883), U.S. representative from Georgia
- Andrew J. Sloan (1835–1875), American soldier and Medal of Honor recipient
- Andrew E. Sloan, American neurosurgeon and physician-scientist
- A. Scott Sloan (1820–1895), American lawyer, politician, and Wisconsin pioneer
