= Charles Henry Smith (Navy Medal of Honor) =

Union Navy sailor in the American Civil War

Charles H. Smith
- Born: March 7, 1826; Standish, Maine, US
- Died: September 4, 1900 (aged 74); Concord, Vermont, US
- Resting place: Ocean View Cemetery, Wells, Maine
- Military career
- Allegiance: United States
- Branch: United States Navy
- Rank: Coxswain
- Unit: USS Rhode Island
- Conflicts: American Civil War
- Awards: Medal of Honor

Charles H. Smith (March 7, 1826 – February 4, 1898) was a Union Navy sailor in the American Civil War and a recipient of the U.S. military's highest decoration, the Medal of Honor, for his actions aboard the USS Rhode Island.

== Biography ==
Smith was born March 7, 1826, in Standish, Maine, Jones was living in Maine when he joined the U.S. Navy. He served during the Civil War as a Coxswain on the USS Rhode Island.

Smith died September 4, 1900, in Concord, Vermont. He is buried in Ocean View Cemetery, Wells, Maine.

== Medal of Honor citation ==
Smith's official Medal of Honor citation reads: Rank and organization: Coxswain, U.S. Navy. Born: 1826, Maine. Accredited to: Maine. G.O. No.: 59, 22 June 1865.

On board the USS Rhode Island which was engaged in rescuing men from the stricken USS Monitor in Mobile Bay, on December 30, 1862. After the Monitor sprang a leak and went down, Smith courageously risked his life in a gallant attempt to rescue members of the crew. Although he, too, lost his life during the hazardous operation, he had made every effort possible to save the lives of his fellow men.

== See also ==
- List of American Civil War Medal of Honor recipients: Q–S
