= Benjamin Swearer =

United States Medal of Honor recipient

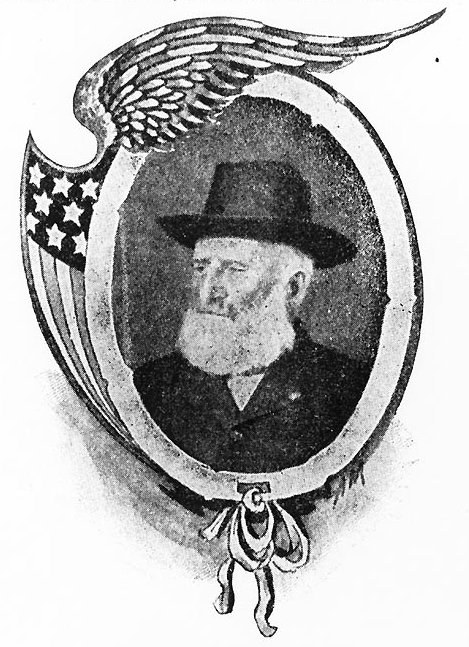
- Seaman Benjamin Swearer
- Born: May 18, 1825; Baltimore, Maryland
- Died: November 2, 1902 (aged 77)
- Military career
- Allegiance: United States of America; Union
- Branch: United States Navy; Union Navy
- Rank: Seaman
- Unit: USS Pawnee
- Conflicts: American Civil War; *Battle of Hatteras Inlet Batteries
- Awards: Medal of Honor

Benjamin Swearer (May 18, 1825 – November 2, 1902) was a United States Navy sailor and a recipient of the United States military's highest decoration—the Medal of Honor—for his actions in the American Civil War.

While serving as a Seaman aboard the steam sloop-of-war USS Pawnee on August 29, 1861, Swearer took part in the capture of Fort Clark at Hatteras Inlet, North Carolina. For his service during this action, known as the Battle of Hatteras Inlet Batteries, Swearer was awarded the Medal of Honor on April 3, 1863.

== Medal of Honor citation ==

Rank and Organization: Seaman, U.S. Navy. Born: 1825, Baltimore, Md. Accredited to: Maryland. G.O. No.: 11, April 3, 1863.

Citation:

Embarked in a surfboat from the U.S.S. Pawnee during action against Fort Clark, off Baltimore Inlet, August 29, 1861. Taking part in a mission to land troops and to remain inshore and provide protection, Swearer rendered gallant service throughout the action and had the honor of being the first man to raise the flag on the captured fort.

== See also ==
- List of American Civil War Medal of Honor recipients: Q–S
