= Augustus I. Robbins =

Soldier and veteran of the American Civil War

- Born: November 17, 1839; Grafton, Vermont, United States
- Died: September 16, 1909 (aged 69); Lakewood, New Jersey, United States
- Burial place: Woodlawn Cemetery, Lakewood, New Jersey
- Military career
- Allegiance: United States
- Branch: United States Army; Union Army
- Rank: Second Lieutenant
- Units: Company B, 2nd Vermont Volunteer Infantry Regiment
- Conflicts: Battle of Spotsylvania Court House, Virginia
- Awards: Medal of Honor

Augustus I. Robbins (November 17, 1839 – September 15, 1909) was an American soldier who fought for the Union Army during the American Civil War. He received the Medal of Honor for valor.

== Biography ==
Robbins received the Medal of Honor on March 24, 1892, for his actions at the Battle of Spotsylvania Court House, Virginia on May 12, 1864, while with Company B of the 2nd Vermont Volunteer Infantry Regiment.

== Medal of Honor citation ==
Citation:

The President of the United States of America, in the name of Congress, takes pleasure in presenting the Medal of Honor to Second Lieutenant Augustus J. Robbins, United States Army, for extraordinary heroism on 12 May 1864, while serving with Company B, 2d Vermont Infantry, in action at Spotsylvania, Virginia. While voluntarily serving as a staff officer, Second Lieutenant Robbins successfully withdrew a regiment across and around a severely exposed position to the rest of the command; was severely wounded.

== See also ==
- List of American Civil War Medal of Honor recipients: Q–S
