= William E. Richey =

Soldier and veteran of the American Civil War

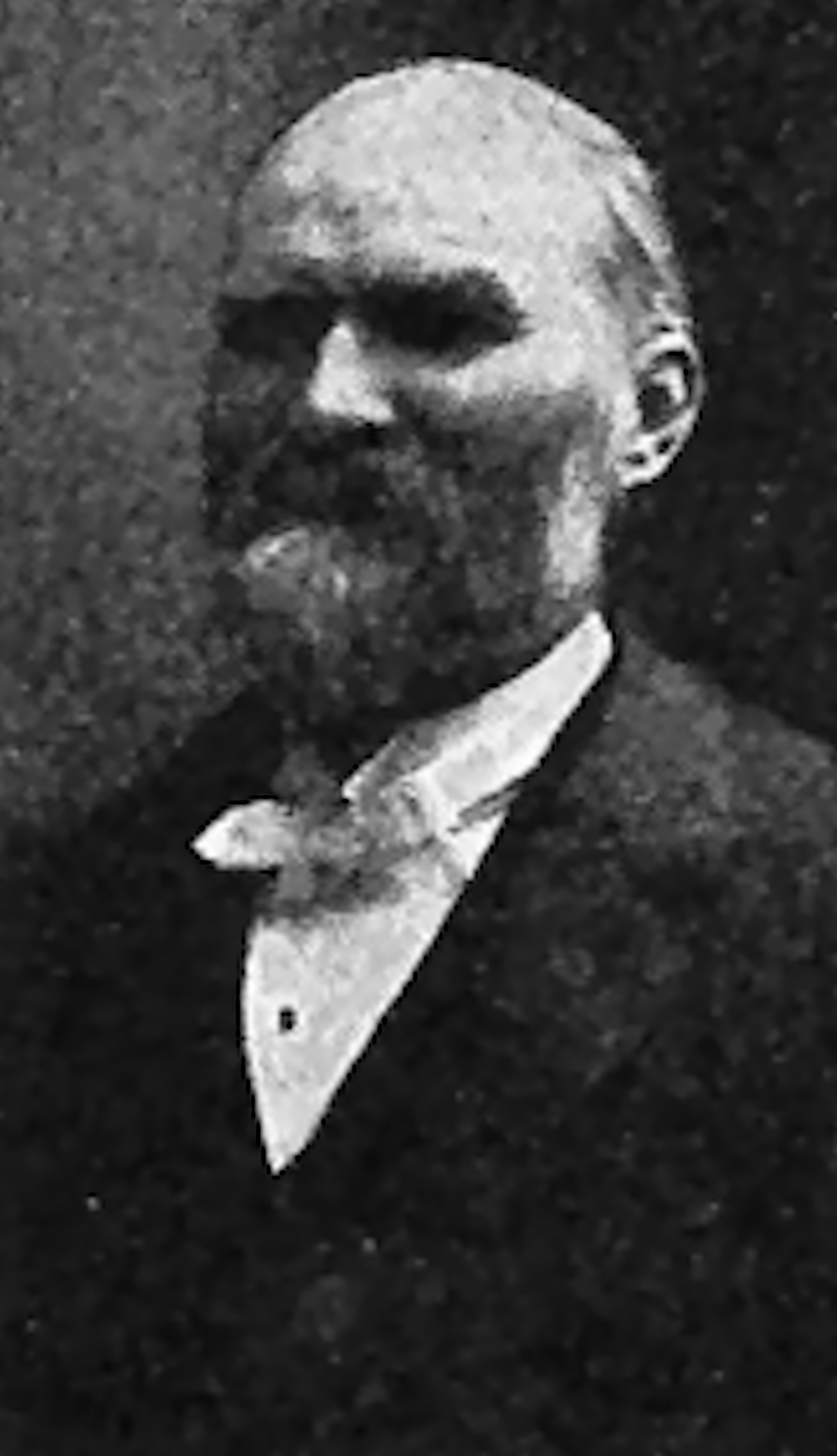
- Born: June 1, 1841; Athens County, Ohio, United States
- Died: June 21, 1909 (aged 68); Harveyville, Kansas, United States
- Burial place: Harveyville Cemetery, Harveyville, Kansas
- Military career
- Allegiance: United States
- Branch: United States Army; Union Army
- Rank: Corporal
- Units: Company A, 15th Ohio Infantry
- Conflicts: Battle of Chickamauga
- Awards: Medal of Honor

William E. Richey (June 1, 1841 – June 21, 1909) was an American soldier who fought for the Union Army during the American Civil War. He received the Medal of Honor for valor.

== Biography ==
Richey received the Medal of Honor in November 9, 1893 for his actions at the Battle of Chickamauga on September 19, 1863 while with Company A of the 15th Ohio Infantry.

== Medal of Honor citation ==
The President of the United States of America, in the name of Congress, takes pleasure in presenting the Medal of Honor to Corporal William E. Richey, United States Army, for extraordinary heroism on 19 September 1863, while serving with Company A, 15th Ohio Infantry, in action at Chickamauga, Georgia. While on the extreme front, between the lines of the combatants single-handed Corporal Richey captured a Confederate major who was armed and mounted.

== See also ==
- List of American Civil War Medal of Honor recipients: Q–S
