= Jacob Sanford =

Soldier and veteran of the American Civil War

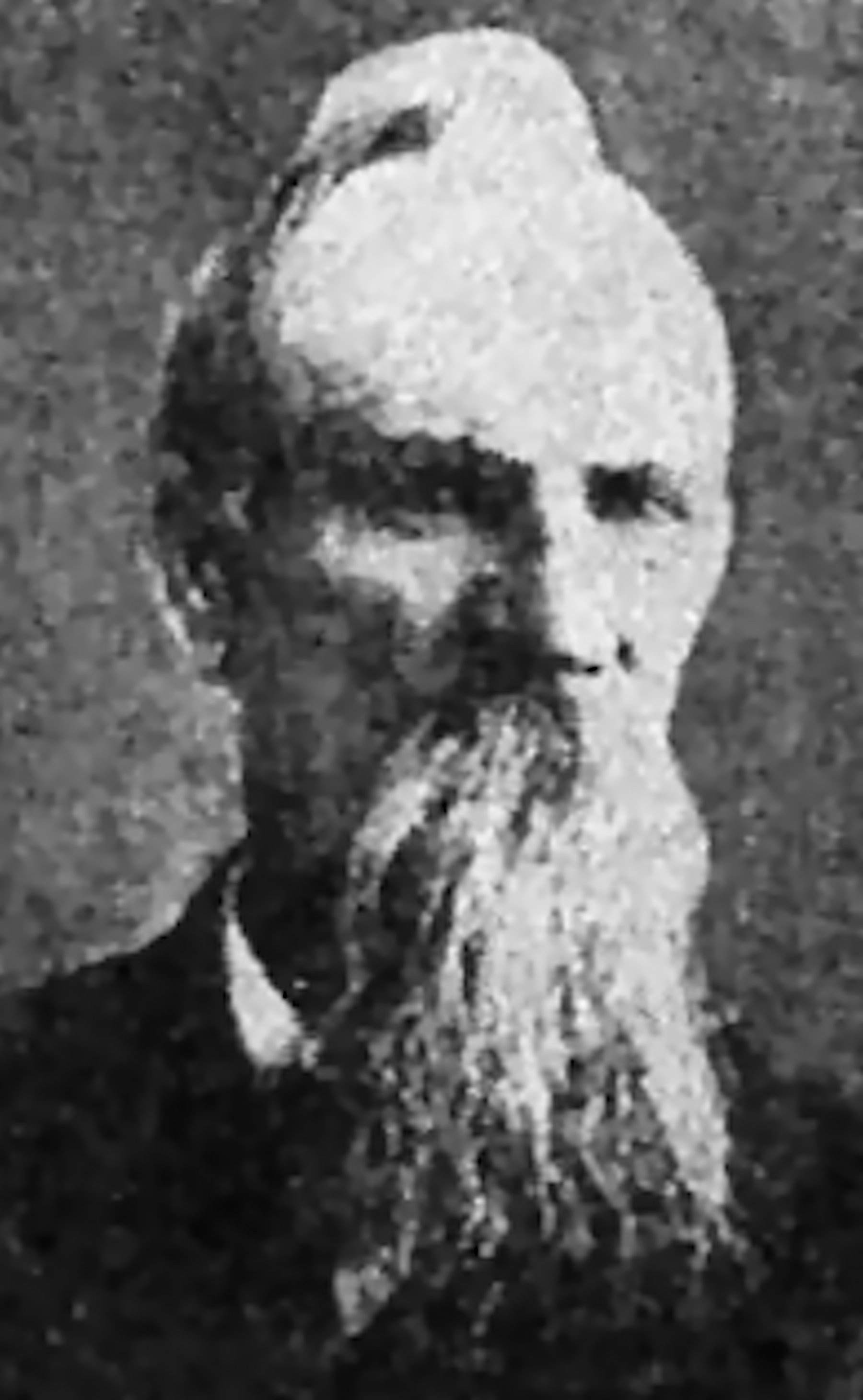
- Born: c. 1840; Fulton County, Illinois, United States
- Died: September 3, 1901; Prairie City, Illinois, United States
- Burial place: Prairie City Cemetery, Prairie City, Illinois
- Military career
- Allegiance: United States
- Branch: United States Army; Union Army
- Rank: Private
- Units: Company F, 55th Illinois Volunteer Infantry Regiment
- Conflicts: Battle of Spotsylvania Court House, Virginia
- Awards: Medal of Honor

Jacob Sanford (c. 1840 – September 3, 1901) was an American soldier who fought for the Union Army during the American Civil War. He received the Medal of Honor for valor.

== Biography ==
Sanford received the Medal of Honor in September 2, 1893 for his actions at the Battle of Spotsylvania Court House, Virginia on May 22, 1863 while with Company F of the 55th Illinois Volunteer Infantry Regiment.

== Medal of Honor citation ==
Citation:

The President of the United States of America, in the name of Congress, takes pleasure in presenting the Medal of Honor to Private Jacob Sanford, United States Army, for gallantry in the charge of the volunteer storming party on 22 May 1863, while serving with 55th Illinois Infantry, in action at Vicksburg, Mississippi.

== See also ==
- List of American Civil War Medal of Honor recipients: Q–S
