= George F. Rebmann =

- Born: 10 April 1840; Browning Township, Schuyler County, Illinois
- Died: 20 August 1918 (aged 78)
- Burial place: Messerer Cemetery, Pleasant View, Schuyler County, Illinois
- Military career
- Allegiance: United States of America
- Branch: United States Army
- Rank: Sergeant
- Units: Company B, 119th Illinois Infantry Regiment
- Conflicts: Battle of Fort Blakeley; American Civil War
- Awards: Medal of Honor

George F. Rebmann (10 April 1840 – 20 August 1918) was an American soldier who fought with the Union Army in the American Civil War. Rebmann received his country's highest award for bravery during combat, the Medal of Honor. Rebmann's medal was awarded for capturing a flag at the Battle of Fort Blakeley, in Alabama on April 9, 1865. He was honored with the award on 8 June 1865.

Rebmann was born in Schuyler County in Illinois, where he later died.

== Medal of Honor citation ==
The President of the United States of America, in the name of Congress, takes pleasure in presenting the Medal of Honor to Sergeant George F. Rebmann, United States Army, for extraordinary heroism on 9 April 1865, while serving with Company B, 119th Illinois Infantry, in action at Fort Blakeley, Alabama, for capture of flag.

== See also ==
- List of American Civil War Medal of Honor recipients: Q–S
