= William R. Richardson (Medal of Honor) =

Soldier and veteran of the American Civil War

- Born: 1842; Cleveland, Ohio, United States
- Died: October 24, 1873 (aged 30–31); Morgantown, West Virginia, United States
- Burial place: Massillon City Cemetery, Massillon, Ohio
- Military career
- Allegiance: United States
- Branch: United States Army; Union Army
- Rank: Private
- Units: Company A, 2nd Ohio Cavalry
- Conflicts: Battle of Sayler's Creek
- Awards: Medal of Honor

William R. Richardson (1842 – October 24, 1873) was an American soldier who fought for the Union Army during the American Civil War and received the Medal of Honor for his valor.

== Biography ==
Richardson received the Medal of Honor on April 7, 1866, for his actions at the Battle of Sayler's Creek during the Third Battle of Petersburg on April 6, 1865, while with Company A of the 2nd Ohio Cavalry.

== Medal of Honor citation ==
Citation:

The President of the United States of America, in the name of Congress, takes pleasure in presenting the Medal of Honor to Private William R. Richardson, United States Army, for extraordinary heroism in action at Sailor's Creek, Virginia, on 6 April 1865. Having been captured and taken to the rear, Private Richardson made his escape rejoined the Union lines, and furnished information of great importance as to the enemy's position and the approaches thereto.

== See also ==
- List of American Civil War Medal of Honor recipients: Q–S
