= John Sullivan (American sailor) =

Civil War Medal of Honor recipient (1839–1913)

- Born: 1839; New York City
- Died: June 1913 (aged 73–74)
- Burial place: Harmony Grove Cemetery; Portsmouth, New Hampshire
- Military career
- Allegiance: United States of America (Union)
- Branch: United States Navy (Union Navy)
- Rank: Seaman
- Unit: USS Monticello
- Conflicts: American Civil War
- Awards: Medal of Honor

John Sullivan (1839 – June 23, 1913) was a Union Navy sailor during the American Civil War who received America's highest military decoration, the Medal of Honor, for his actions while serving aboard the USS Monticello.

Sullivan was born in 1839 in New York City. From June 23 to 25, 1864, he showed "gallantry and coolness" during a reconnaissance mission against Confederate defenses in the harbor of Wilmington, North Carolina. For these actions, he was issued the Medal of Honor six months later, on December 31, 1864.

He is interred at Harmony Grove Cemetery in Portsmouth, New Hampshire.

== Medal of Honor citation ==

Rank and Organization:

Seaman, U.S. Navy. Born: 1839, New York, N.Y. Accredited to: New York. G.O. No.: 45, December 31, 1864.

Citation:

Served as seaman on board the U.S.S. Monticello during the reconnaissance of the harbor and water defenses of Wilmington, N.C. 23 to 25 June 1864. Taking part in a reconnaissance of enemy defenses which covered a period of 2 days and nights, Sullivan courageously carried out his duties during this action, which resulted in the capture of a mail carrier and mail, the cutting of a telegraph wire, and the capture of a large group of prisoners. Although in immediate danger from the enemy at all times, Sullivan showed gallantry and coolness throughout this action which resulted in the gaining of much vital information of the rebel defenses.

== See also ==
- List of American Civil War Medal of Honor recipients: Q–S
