= Edward Ringold =

Edward Ringgold
- Born: c. 1827; Baltimore, Maryland, US
- Died: 14 October 1864 off Folly Island, South Carolina, US
- Military career
- Allegiance: United States of America
- Branch: U.S. Navy
- Rank: Coxswain
- Unit: (United States Navy) USS Wabash
- Conflicts: American Civil War: Pocataligo, South Carolina
- Awards: - Medal of Honor

Edward Ringgold (c. 1827 – 14 October 1864) was a United States Navy coxswain and a Medal of Honor recipient for his actions in the American Civil War.

== Biography ==
On October 22, 1862, in action at Pocataligo, South Carolina, at 10:00AM troops began disembarking from their transporters, with three 12 pound boat howitzers and gun crews from the USS Wabash, Under the command of Lieutenant Lloyd Phoenix. Traveling with General John Milton Brannan's forces through swamps, thickets, and past burned bridges all of which delayed the movement of the union forces. After landing the naval crews dragged the howitzers five miles inland and immediately met the enemy. Opening up a rapid fire, the naval gun crews advanced with the army forces until they fired away most of their ammunition. At this point Coxswain Edward Ringgold of the USS Wabash ran back two miles filled his shirt with fixed ammunition, slung it over his back and ran back to the front under heavy fire, arriving in time to check the enemy's advance.

Ringgold drowned off Folly Island on 14 October 1864. His remains were not recovered.

== Medal of Honor citation ==

Rank and Organization:

Coxswain, U.S. Navy. Born: 1827, Baltimore, Md. Accredited To: Maryland. G.O. No.: 17, July 10, 1863.

Citation:

Served as coxswain on board the U.S.S. Wabash in the engagement at Pocataligo, 22 October 1862. Soliciting permission to accompany the howitzer corps, and performing his duty with such gallantry and presence of mind as to attract the attention of all around him, Ringgold, knowing there was a scarcity of ammunition, went through the whole line of fire with his shirt slung over his shoulder filled with fixed ammunition which he had brought from 2 miles to the rear of the lines.

== See also ==
- List of American Civil War Medal of Honor recipients: Q–S
