= Richard H. Seward =

Richard Henry Seward (Note: Seward's name was incorrectly listed as "Richard E. Seward" on his citation.)
- Born: October 10, 1840; Kittery, Maine
- Died: May 30, 1899 (aged 58)
- Burial place: First Christian Church Cemetery, Kittery Point, Maine
- Military career
- Allegiance: United States
- Branch: United States Navy
- Rank: Paymaster's steward
- Unit: USS Commodore
- Conflicts: American Civil War
- Awards: Medal of Honor

Richard Henry Seward (October 10, 1840 – May 30, 1899) was a Union Navy sailor in the American Civil War who received the U.S. military's highest decoration, the Medal of Honor.

Seward was born on October 10, 1840, in Kittery Point, Maine, to a family of mariners. His grandfather had served with John Paul Jones on the USS Ranger, and his father and brother were sailors who died together at sea.

Seward joined the U.S. Navy in 1859 and served during the Civil War as a paymaster's steward on the USS Commodore. At Ship Island Sound, Louisiana, on November 23, 1863, Seward recovered the bodies of two soldiers despite heavy fire. For this action, he was awarded the Medal of Honor five months later on April 16, 1864.

He was a Companion of the Massachusetts Commandery of the Naval Order of the United States.

Seward died on May 30, 1899, at age 58 and was buried at First Christian Church Cemetery in Kittery Point, Maine, under the name "Richard H. Seaward".

== Medal of Honor citation ==
Seward's official Medal of Honor citation reads:

- Rank and organization: Paymaster's Steward, U.S. Navy
- Place and date: Ship Island Sound, La., 23 November 1863
- Date of issue: 16 April 1864

Served as paymaster's steward on board the U.S.S. Commodore, November 1863. Carrying out his duties courageously, Seward "volunteered to go on the field amidst a heavy fire to recover the bodies of 2 soldiers which he brought off with the aid of others; a second instance of personal valor within a fortnight." Promoted to acting master's mate.
