= Philipp Schlachter =

Soldier and veteran of the American Civil War

- Born: June 17, 1841; Germany
- Died: September 9, 1923 (aged 82); Sturgis, Michigan, United States
- Burial place: Oak Lawn Cemetery, Sturgis, Michigan
- Military career
- Allegiance: United States
- Branch: United States Army; Union Army
- Rank: Private
- Units: Company F, 73rd New York Volunteer Infantry Regiment
- Conflicts: Battle of Spotsylvania Court House, Virginia
- Awards: Medal of Honor

Philipp Schlachter (June 17, 1841 – September 9, 1923) was a German-born soldier who fought for the Union Army during the American Civil War. He received the Medal of Honor for valor.

== Biography ==
Schlachter received the Medal of Honor in December 1, 1864 for his actions at the Battle of Spotsylvania Court House, Virginia on May 12, 1864 while with Company F of the 73rd New York Volunteer Infantry Regiment.

== Medal of Honor citation ==
Citation:

The President of the United States of America, in the name of Congress, takes pleasure in presenting the Medal of Honor to Private Philipp Schlachter, United States Army, for extraordinary heroism on 12 May 1864, while serving with Company F, 73d New York Infantry, in action at Spotsylvania, Virginia, for capture of flag of 15th Louisiana Infantry (Confederate States of America).

== See also ==
- List of American Civil War Medal of Honor recipients: Q–S
