= Charles F. Sancrainte =

Soldier and veteran of the American Civil War

- Born: February 28, 1838; Monroe County, Michigan, US
- Died: May 5, 1910 (aged 72); Buffalo, New York, US
- Burial place: United German and French Cemetery, Cheektowaga, New York
- Military career
- Allegiance: United States
- Branch: United States Army; Union Army
- Rank: Private
- Units: Company B, 15th Michigan Volunteer Infantry Regiment
- Conflicts: Battle of Atlanta
- Awards: Medal of Honor

Charles Francis Xavier Sancrainte (born Sanscrainte, February 28, 1838 – May 5, 1910) was an American soldier who fought for the Union Army during the American Civil War. He received the Medal of Honor for valor.

== Biography ==
Sancrainte received the Medal of Honor on July 25, 1892, for his actions at the Battle of Atlanta on July 22, 1864, while with Company B of the 15th Michigan Volunteer Infantry Regiment.

== Medal of Honor citation ==
Citation:

The President of the United States of America, in the name of Congress, takes pleasure in presenting the Medal of Honor to Private Charles Francis Sancrainte, United States Army, for extraordinary heroism on 22 July 1864, while serving with Company B, 15th Michigan Infantry, in action at Atlanta, Georgia. Private Sancrainte voluntarily scaled the enemy's breastworks and signaled to his commanding officer in charge; also in single combat captured the colors of the 5th Texas Regiment (Confederate States of America)."

== See also ==
- List of American Civil War Medal of Honor recipients: Q–S
