= John T. Rutherford =

John T. Rutherford (August 23, 1823 – August 27, 1898) was a recipient of the Medal of Honor during the American Civil War. Rutherford was born on August 23, 1823, in Russell, New York, and died on August 27, 1898, in Chicago, Illinois. He served as a First Lieutenant in the 9th New York Volunteer Cavalry Regiment. Later in the war he reached the rank of Brevet Major. He received his medal for two separate actions at Yellow Tavern on May 11, 1864, and Hanovertown on May 27, 1864. He is buried in Brookside Cemetery, Waddington, New York.

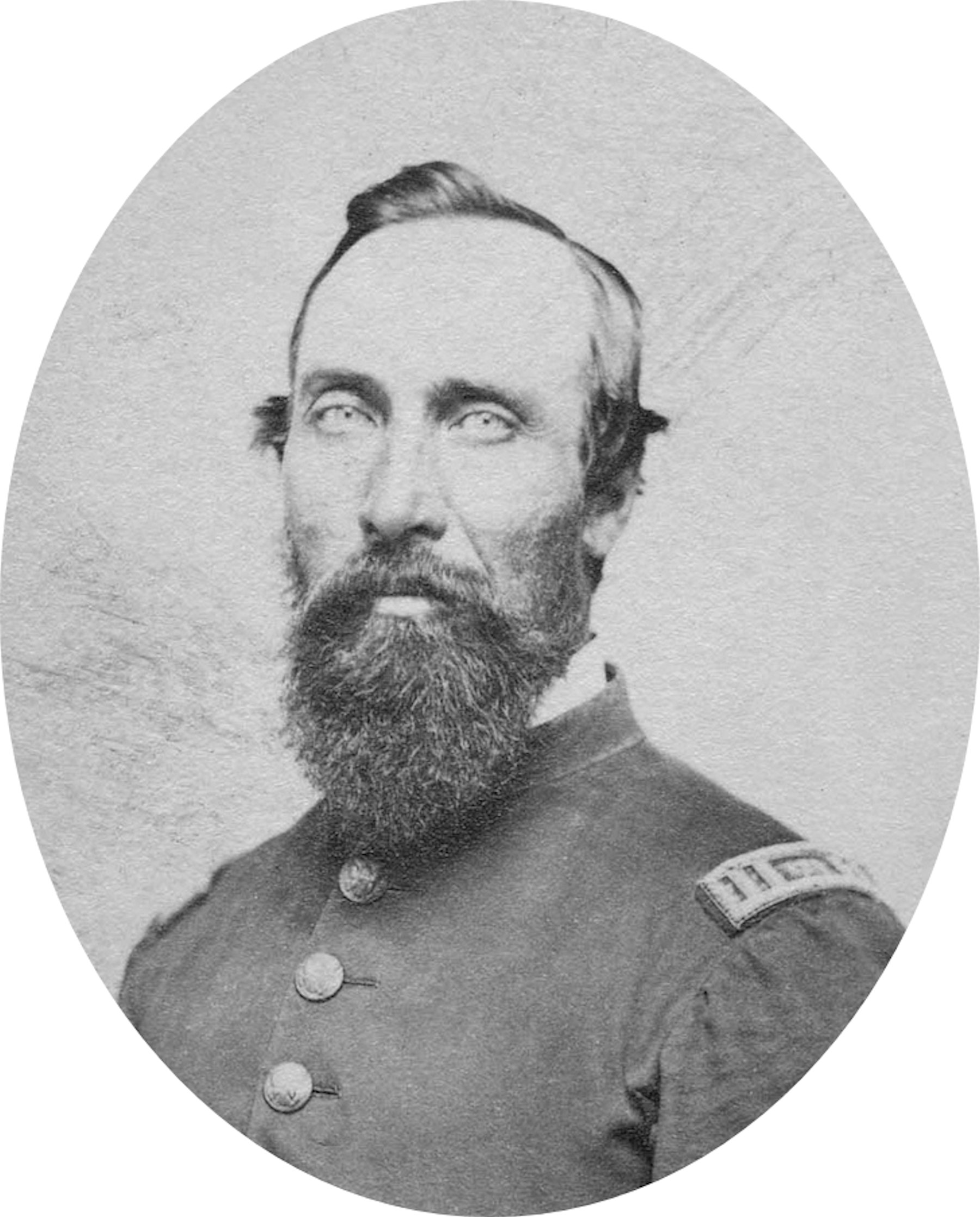

== Medal of Honor Citation ==
Made a successful charge at Yellow Tavern, Virginia, 11 May 1864, by which 90 prisoners were captured. On 27 May 1864, in a gallant dash on a superior force of the enemy and in a personal encounter, captured his opponent.

Date Issued: March 22, 1892
