= Henry Sartwell =

United States Army sergeant

Sergeant Henry Sartwell
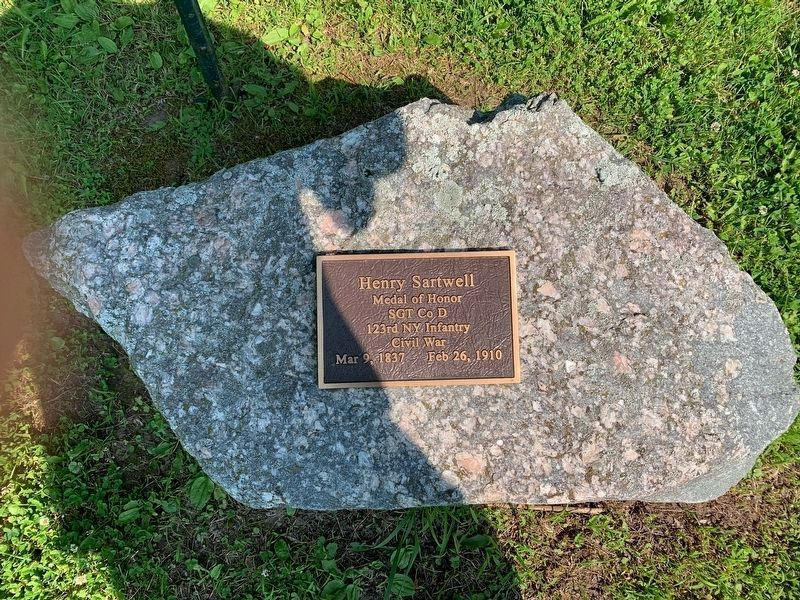
- Born: 7 March 1837; Ticonderoga, New York
- Died: 26 February 1910 (aged 72); Fort Ann, New York
- Burial place: Fish Hill Cemetery, Fort Ann, New York
- Military career
- Allegiance: United States
- Branch: Army
- Service years: 1862-1865
- Rank: Sergeant
- Units: Company D, 123rd New York Infantry
- Conflicts: Battle of Chancellorsville, Virginia
- Awards: Medal of Honor

Henry Sartwell (7 March 1837 – 26 February 1910) was a sergeant in the United States Army who was awarded the Presidential Medal of Honor for gallantry during the American Civil War. Sartwell was awarded the medal on 17 November 1896 for actions performed at the Battle of Chancellorsville in Virginia on 3 May 1863.

== Personal life ==
Sartwell was born on 7 March 1837 in Ticonderoga, Essex County, New York. He married Esther Fish Sartwell and fathered one son, George W. Sartwell, who died in 1863. He died in Fort Ann, Washington County, New York on 26 February 1910 and was buried in Fish Hill Cemetery in Fort Ann.

== Military service ==
Sartwell enlisted in the Army as a private on 28 July 1862 at Fort Ann. He was mustered in to Company D of the 123rd New York Infantry on 14 August 1862. He was promoted to sergeant on 4 September 1862. On 3 May 1863, at the Battle of Chancellorsville, Sartwell was shot in the left arm. After leaving the field for a short time he returned and fought with his unit until eventually being forced to retire because of blood loss. Sartwell was again wounded in a skirmish near Kennesaw Mountain, Georgia and was admitted to a hospital in Albany, New York. He was discharged from the Army on 27 May 1865.

Sartwell's Medal of Honor citation reads:

The President of the United States of America, in the name of Congress, takes pleasure in presenting the Medal of Honor to Sergeant Henry Sartwell, United States Army, for extraordinary heroism on 3 May 1863, while serving with Company D, 123d New York Infantry, in action at Chancellorsville, Virginia. Sergeant Sartwell was severely wounded by a gunshot in his left arm, went half a mile to the rear but insisted on returning to his company and continued to fight bravely until he became exhausted from the loss of blood and was compelled to retire from the field.

— Daniel S. Lamont, Secretary of War
