= Thomas Riley (Medal of Honor) =

Corporal Thomas Riley
- Born: Unknown; Ireland
- Died: Unknown; Unknown
- Military career
- Allegiance: United States (Union)
- Branch: Army
- Service years: 1861-1865
- Rank: Corporal
- Units: Company D, 1st Louisiana Cavalry
- Conflicts: Battle of Fort Blakely
- Awards: Medal of Honor

Thomas Riley was an Irish-born Corporal in the United States Army who earned the Medal of Honor for gallantry during the American Civil War. On 4 April 1865, Riley captured the flag of the 6th Alabama Cavalry. For this action, he was awarded the Medal of Honor on 8 June 1865.

== Military service ==
Riley enlisted in New Orleans served with Company D of the 1st Louisiana Cavalry Regiment. He was a private for most of his service, including during the action from which he received his Medal of Honor. On 4 April 1865, during the Battle of Fort Blakely near Fort Blakely, Alabama, Riley captured the flag of the 6th Alabama Cavalry Regiment.

Riley's Medal of Honor citation reads:

The President of the United States of America, in the name of Congress, takes pleasure in presenting the Medal of Honor to Private Thomas Riley, United States Army, for extraordinary heroism on 4 April 1865, while serving with Company D, 1st Louisiana Cavalry, in action at Fort Blakely, Alabama. Private riley captured the flag of the 6th Alabama Cavalry.

— R. A. Alger, Secretary of War
