= Wilson Smith (Medal of Honor) =

American Civil War Medal of Honor recipient (1841–1901)

Corporal Wilson Smith
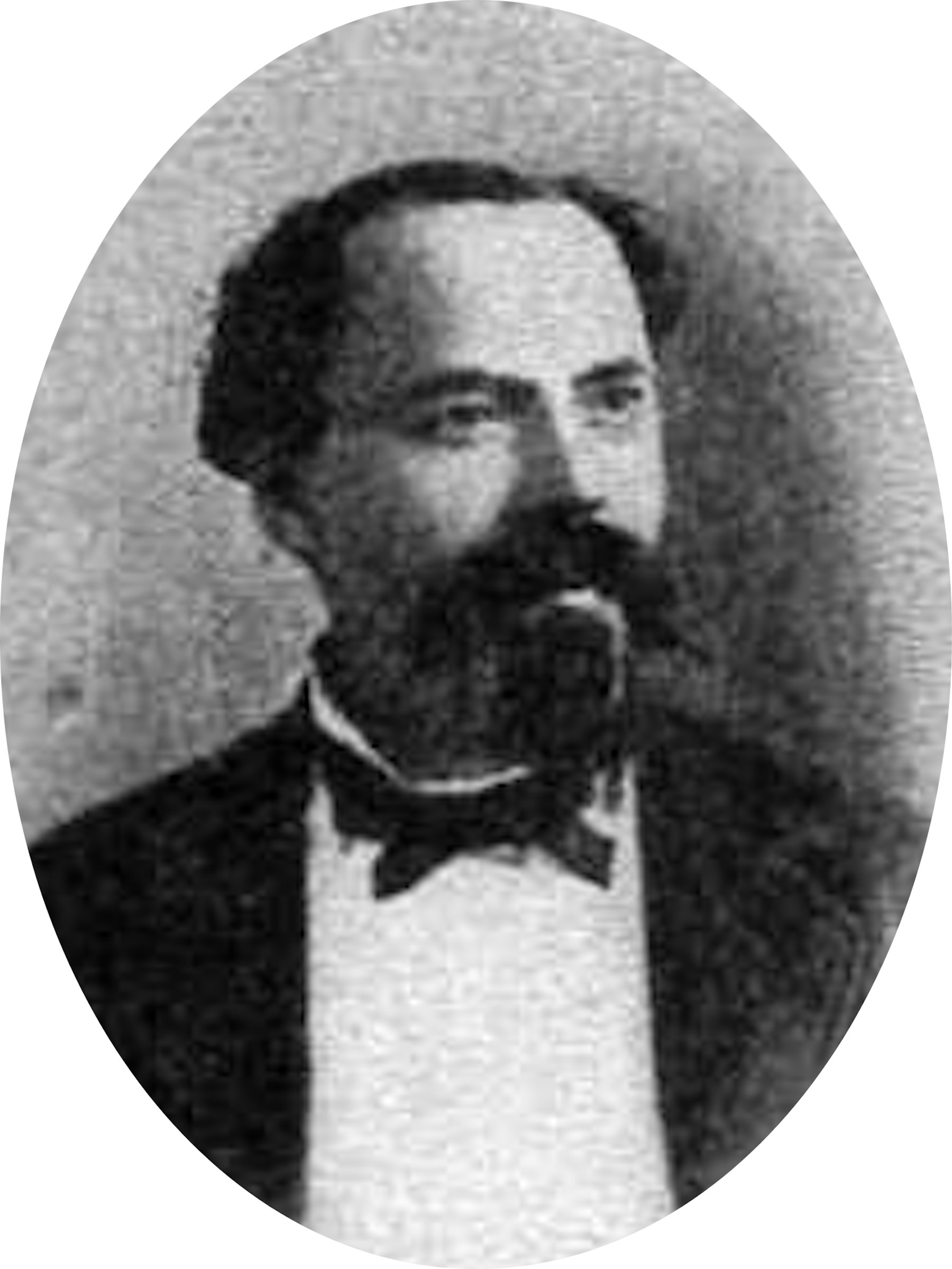
- Smith in 1875
- Born: 6 September 1841; Madison, New York
- Died: 22 February 1901 (aged 59); Rome, New York
- Burial place: Rome Cemetery
- Military career
- Allegiance: United States (Union)
- Branch: Army
- Service years: 1861-1863
- Rank: Sergeant
- Units: Company H, 3rd New York Light Artillery
- Conflicts: Battle of Washington
- Awards: Medal of Honor

Wilson Smith (6 September 1841 – 22 February 1901) was a corporal of the United States Army who was awarded the Medal of Honor for gallantry during the American Civil War. He was awarded the medal on 24 April 1896 for actions performed in 1862 during the prelude to the Battle of Washington in North Carolina.

== Personal life ==
Smith was born on 6 September 1841 in either Madison or Oriskany Falls, New York. After being discharged from the Army, he worked in a casket factory in Oneida, New York, and served as a county supervisor in Rome, New York. He died on 22 February 1901 in Rome and was buried in Rome Cemetery.

== Military service ==
Smith enlisted in the Army on 4 October 1861 as a private and was assigned to Battery H of the 3rd New York Light Artillery. He was promoted to corporal on 9 January 1862 and to sergeant on 12 September 1862. On 6 September 1862, during a Confederate attack on the Union-held Washington, North Carolina, Smith took command of an isolated gun, and, while under heavy fire and in hand-to-hand combat, returned 15 rounds of fire at and scattered the Confederate line while sustaining heavy injuries. Due to injuries sustained in this engagement, his leg was later amputated above the knee. His actions helped prevent the Confederates from taking the town and led to his Medal of Honor nomination.

Smith later described his actions in writing:

Before daylight of September 6, 1862, the men of Battery H, New York Light Artillery of which I was a corporal, were encamped in the streets of Little Washington, N. C. We were ordered to fall in, and an expedition consisting of Battery H, four guns, a detachment of cavalry and infantry and a supply train, started for some point unknown to us.

The morning was dark and foggy. Several gunboats lay in the stream, the men on board being asleep. After the column had moved six or seven blocks, firing was heard to the left. Then a mounted officer appeared, shouting that the town had been surprised by a large force. A stampede immediately followed this announcement and the column ahead was in complete confusion. The cavalry following maintained discipline. The order of the commanding officer: 'Steady, men' could be plainly heard. The lieutenant in charge of one gun having disappeared in the confusion, I assumed command and proceeded rapidly in the direction of the firing.

After advancing some blocks we came upon the remainder of the battery unlimbered and ready for action. We continued until we reached River Street, where the gun was unlimbered and loaded with canister. Our piece was unsupported. As the men finished loading, the fog lifted, and a body of men filling the entire street, and numbering about 600, was discovered marching rapidly toward our gun. I hesitated, not knowing who they were. Just then Adjutant Guiero, of the Third New York Cavalry, rode up and said:

'Young man, why don't you fire?'

I replied: 'I don't know who they are.'

'Quite right',' he said. 'I'll soon see.'

He advanced in the direction of the men, but, in an instant, he wheeled and shouted: 'In God's name fire!' Then I gave the order to fire, and in a few minutes fifteen charges of canister were hurled against the advancing men, who first halted, and then retreated rapidly in the direction whence they came. Up to this time not one of my small detachment had been injured except myself, a bullet cutting my ear slightly.

The gun was then limbered, and we followed the enemy up the street to the next block, where the Tar River Bridge provides an entrance to the town. Upon arriving at the corner we could see that the retreating Confederates were mixed in confusion with another regiment, which had been following them. The officers were endeavoring to rally and reform their lines. We again attempted to unlimber the gun, but the horses, in making a short turn at the entrance to the bridge, became stalled, and the gun remained fast.

Just then the Confederates discharged a volley, a portion of which struck the wheel horses, causing them to plunge and wheel. Now our men were enabled to unlimber the gun. Before it could be loaded, however, the Confederates were upon us with their bayonets, and a hand-to-hand fight ensued in front of the gun. During this combat John Malone and John McGrehan loaded the gun with canister. We immediately discharged it, and after a few shots the street was rapidly cleared of the enemy. But their rifle fire on the street was terrible. Within a few minutes every man at the gun was killed except John Malone and myself. Two soldiers from Battery G, one named Lincoln, the other Albert Willard, three members from Potter's North Carolina Infantry, and three members of the Third New York Cavalry then joined us and assisted in working the gun.

A large body of Confederates, in the meantime, had entered the grounds of ex-Governor Grice's residence and was pouring volley after volley into our detachment. The last charge left was a solid shot. All our newly joined comrades had been killed or wounded, and Malone and I loaded the gun for the last time. Just before the shot was inserted into the gun a bullet shattered my knee, and as I fired, Malone received a shot through the body, which completely paralyzed his leg.

He threw his arms about me and I carried him on my back to the bridge stairs, hobbling along with the aid of my saber. How it was possible to reach the edge of the water alive, is a mystery to me. A cutter then took us both, with the wounded Lincoln, to the gunboat Louisiana. As our gun ceased firing, the Louisiana came into action, her guns covering the position we had abandoned, and soon after the Confederates were in full retreat.

The next day, September 7, on my twenty-first birthday, my leg was amputated above the knee. While I was lying in the hospital at New Berne, Major-General J. B. Foster, the corps commander, and Colonel J. H. Ladlie, the regimental commander,

met at my bedside. The colonel said that the action of my gun detachment had saved Little Washington to the Union forces.

— Wilson Smith, Deeds of Valor

Wilson was discharged for wounds on 1 February 1863 at Utica, New York. His Medal of Honor citation reads:

The President of the United States of America, in the name of Congress, takes pleasure in presenting the Medal of Honor to Corporal Wilson Smith, United States Army, for extraordinary heroism on 6 September 1862, while serving with Battery H, 3d New York Light Artillery, in action at Washington, North Carolina. Corporal Smith took command of a gun (the lieutenant in charge having disappeared) and fired the same so rapidly and effectively that the enemy was repulsed, although for a time a hand-to-hand conflict was had over the gun.

— D. S. Lamont, Secretary of War
