= George W. Schmal =

George William Schmal
- Born: 21 February 1849; Buffalo, New York
- Died: 4 August 1923 (aged 74); Erie County, New York
- Burial place: Unknown
- Children: 1
- Military career
- Allegiance: United States (Union)
- Branch: Army
- Service years: 1865
- Rank: Blacksmith
- Unit: 24th New York Cavalry
- Conflicts: Paines Crossroads, Virginia
- Awards: Medal of Honor

George William Schmal (21 February 1849 - 4 August 1923) was a blacksmith in the United States Army who was awarded the Presidential Medal of Honor for gallantry during the American Civil War. Schmal was awarded the medal on 3 May 1865 for actions performed during the Battle of Paines Crossroads on 5 April 1865.

== Personal life ==
Schmal was born in Germany on 21 February 1849. He fathered one known child, Frank Peter Schmal (1873–1960). Schmal died in Erie County, New York on 4 August 1923 and was buried in Forest Lawn Cemetery in Buffalo, New York.

== Military service ==
Schmal enlisted in the Army as a blacksmith on 8 March 1865 in Buffalo. He was assigned to Company M of the 24th New York Cavalry, which was renamed the 1st New York Provincial Cavalry on 17 June 1865. On 5 April 1865, during the Battle of Paines Crossroads in Virginia, Schmal captured an unspecified Confederate battle flag. For this action, he was awarded the Medal of Honor.

Schmal's Medal of Honor citation reads:

The President of the United States of America, in the name of Congress, takes pleasure in presenting the Medal of Honor to Blacksmith George William Schmal, United States Army, for extraordinary heroism on 5 April 1865, while serving with Company M, 24th New York Cavalry, in action at Paines Crossroads, Virginia, for capture of flag.

— E. M. Stanton, Secretary of War

Schmal was mustered out of the Army on 19 July 1865 at Cloud's Mills, Virginia.
