= Elisha B. Seaman =

Corporal Elisha B. Seaman
- Born: c. 1838; Logan County, Ohio
- Died: 12 June 1919 (aged 80–81)
- Burial place: Mount Tabor Church Cemetery, Mingo, Ohio
- Military career
- Allegiance: United States
- Branch: Army
- Service years: 1861–1865
- Rank: Corporal
- Units: Company A, 66th Ohio Infantry
- Conflicts: Chancellorsville, Virginia
- Awards: Medal of Honor

Elisha B. Seaman (c. 1838 – 12 June 1919) was a corporal in the United States Army who was awarded the Medal of Honor for gallantry during the American Civil War. Seaman was awarded the medal on 24 June 1892 for actions performed at the Battle of Chancellorsville in Virginia on 2 May 1863.

== Personal life ==
Seaman was born in about 1838 in Logan County, Ohio. He fathered two children. He died on 12 June 1919 and was buried in Mount Tabor Church Cemetery in Mingo, Ohio.

== Military service ==
Seaman enlisted in the Army as a private on 22 October 1861 and was mustered into Company A of the 66th Ohio Infantry. He was promoted to corporal. Seaman's Medal of Honor citation reads:

The President of the United States of America, in the name of Congress, takes pleasure in presenting the Medal of Honor to Private Elisha B. Seaman, United States Army, for extraordinary heroism on 2 May 1863, while serving with Company A, 66th Ohio Infantry, in action at Chancellorsville, Virginia. Private Seaman was one of party of four who voluntarily brought into the Union lines, under fire, a wounded Confederate officer from whom was obtained valuable information concerning the enemy.

— S. B. Elkins, Secretary of War

Seaman was mustered out of the Army on 15 July 1865 in Louisville, Kentucky.
