= Andrew J. Sloan =

Soldier and veteran of the American Civil War

- Born: May 9, 1835; Bedford County, Pennsylvania
- Died: January 17, 1875 (aged 39); Colesburg, Iowa
- Burial place: Platt Cemetery, Colesburg, Iowa
- Military career
- Allegiance: United States of America
- Branch: United States Army; Union Army
- Rank: Private
- Unit: 12th Iowa Infantry Regiment
- Conflicts: Battle of Nashville
- Awards: Medal of Honor

Andrew Jackson Sloan (May 9, 1835 – January 17, 1875) was an American soldier who fought for the Union Army during the American Civil War. He received the Medal of Honor for valor.

== Biography ==
Sloan received the Medal of Honor on February 24, 1865, for his actions at the Battle of Nashville on December 16, 1864, while with Company H of the 12th Iowa Infantry Regiment.

== Medal of Honor citation ==
Citation:

The President of the United States of America, in the name of Congress, takes pleasure in presenting the Medal of Honor to Private Andrew Jackson Sloan, United States Army, for extraordinary heroism on 16 December 1864, while serving with Company H, 12th Iowa Infantry, in action at Nashville, Tennessee. Private Sloan captured the flag of 1st Louisiana Battery (Confederate States of America)."

== See also ==
- List of American Civil War Medal of Honor recipients: Q-S
