= Andrew Schmauch =

American Medal of Honor recipient

First Sergeant Andrew Anton Schmauch
- Born: 30 May 1841; Rottenburg am Neckar, Kingdom of Württemberg (modern day Baden-Württemberg, Germany)
- Died: 20 August 1923 (aged 82); Ashland, Kentucky
- Military career
- Allegiance: United States (Union)
- Branch: Army
- Service years: 1861-1865
- Rank: First Sergeant
- Units: Company A, 30th Ohio Infantry
- Conflicts: Vicksburg, Mississippi
- Awards: Medal of Honor

Andrew Anton Schmauch (30 May 1841 – 20 August 1923) was a first sergeant of the United States Army who was awarded the Medal of Honor for gallantry during the American Civil War. He was awarded the medal on 9 July 1864 for actions performed at the Siege of Vicksburg in 1863.

== Personal life ==
Schmauch was born in Rottenburg am Neckar, Landkreis Tübingen in the Kingdom of Württemberg (modern day Baden-Württemberg, Germany) on 30 May 1841. He married Sophia M. Miller in 1867 and fathered twelve children, of which ten survived to adulthood. Schmauch died on 20 August 1923 in Ashland, Kentucky and was buried in Ashland Cemetery.

== Military service ==
Schmauch enlisted in the Army as a private on 15 August 1861 in Portsmouth, Ohio and was assigned to Company A of the 30th Ohio Infantry. On 22 May 1863, at the Siege of Vicksburg in Mississippi, Schmauch and approximately 150 other men volunteered to be part of an extremely dangerous storming party whose job it was to build as bridge over a Confederate ditch near Vicksburg while under fire to allow for Union forces to access the town. Approximately half of the men were killed or wounded in the initial charge to the ditch and over the course of the hours long firefight only around 20 were not killed or wounded. For participating in this action, Schmauch was awarded the Medal of Honor.

Schmauch's Medal of Honor citation reads:

The President of the United States of America, in the name of Congress, takes pleasure in presenting the Medal of Honor to Private Andrew Schmauch, United States Army, for gallantry in the charge of the volunteer storming party on 22 May 1863, while serving with Company A, 30th Ohio Infantry, in action at Vicksburg, Mississippi.

— E. M. Stanton

Schmauch was subsequently promoted to corporal on 2 March 1864, to sergeant on 22 June 1864, and to first sergeant on 10 August 1864. He was mustered out of the Army on 13 August 1865 at Little Rock, Arkansas.
