= George D. Sidman =

Union Civil War soldier

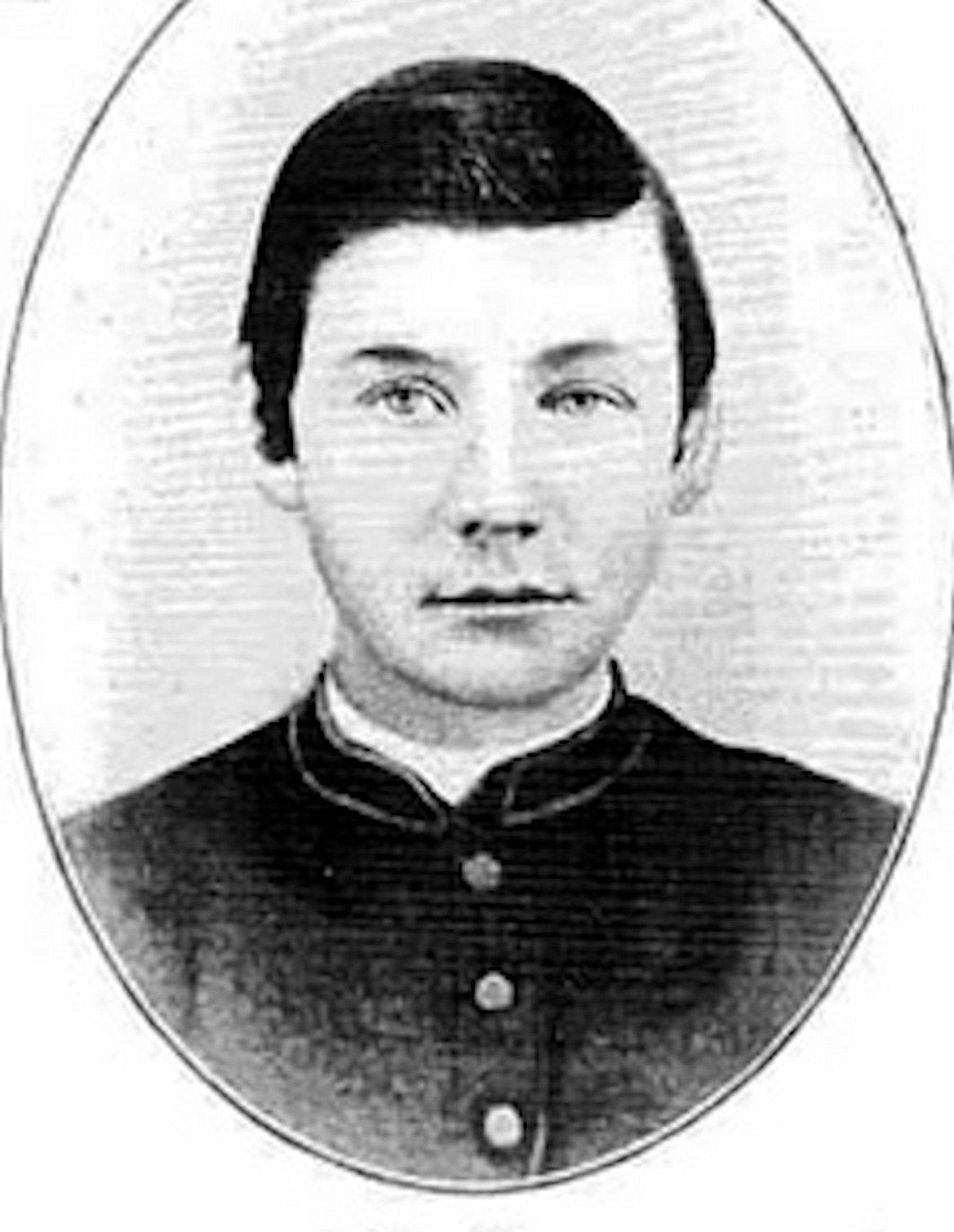
Portrait of George Sidman, 1865

George Dallas Sidman (November 24, 1844 – February 3, 1920) was a soldier who fought in the American Civil War and became a recipient of the Civil War Congressional Medal of Honor.

He served as a 16-year-old drummer boy Private in Company C, 16th Michigan Infantry.

During an assault on a superior Confederate force at Battle of Gaines' Mill, Virginia, June 27, 1862, Private Sidman remained in front of his comrades and continued to rally the charge until wounded in the hip. For bravery in battle, he was promoted to Corporal and awarded the Medal of Honor on April 6, 1892.

After injuries sustained multiple times in the Civil War, Sidman would serve the rest of the War in the Veteran Reserve Corps.

After the Civil War, Sidman would apply and receive a Civil War Pension. Upon his death, Sidman is buried in Arlington National Cemetery.
