= James M. Seitzinger =

- Born: November 24, 1846; Pottsville, Pennsylvania
- Died: January 14, 1924 (aged 67)
- Burial place: Christ Church Cemetery, Fountain Springs, Pennsylvania
- Military career
- Allegiance: United States of America
- Branch: United States Army
- Service years: 1864 - 1865
- Rank: Sergeant
- Unit: 116th Pennsylvania Infantry
- Conflicts: Battle of the Wilderness; Battle of Cold Harbor
- Awards: Medal of Honor

James M. Seitzinger (1846–1924) was an American recipient of Medal of Honor which he was awarded on March 1, 1906.

== Biography ==
Seitzinger was born on November 24, 1846, in Pottsville, Pennsylvania. In April 1864, he joined Company G of the 116th Pennsylvania Infantry along with his father Israel. Together they fought in the Battle of the Wilderness, Battle of Cold Harbor, Battle of Spotsylvania and Second Battle of Petersburg. On August 25, 1864, he was nominated for the Medal of Honor recipient, for his courageous flag rescue, but didn't receive the medal until March 1, 1906. He died at the age of 77, on January 14, 1924, and was buried at Christ Church Cemetery in Fountain Springs, Pennsylvania.
