= Frank Shubert =

2nd Lieutenant Frank Shubert
- Franz Joubert
- Born: 12 January 1841; Hesse, Germany
- Died: 24 December 1920 (aged 79)
- Burial place: Prospect Hill Cemetery, Canajoharie, New York, US
- Military career
- Allegiance: United States; Union
- Branch: United States Army; Union Army
- Service years: 1861–1865
- Rank: 1st Lieutenant
- Units: Company E, 43rd New York Infantry
- Conflicts: American Civil War: Battle of Cedar Creek; Third Battle of Petersburg
- Awards: Medal of Honor

Frank Shubert (12 January 1841 – 24 December 1920) was a second lieutenant in the United States Army who was awarded the Medal of Honor for gallantry at the Third Battle of Petersburg in Virginia during the American Civil War.

== Personal life ==
Shubert was born in the Grand Duchy of Hesse, in the modern-day state of Hesse, Germany on 12 January 1841. He immigrated to the United States in 1858 and applied for citizenship in Fonda, New York. He worked for a year on a farm in Palatine Bridge, New York and learned the shoemaking profession in Canajoharie, New York. He married Cecilia M. Lettice Shubert and fathered four children. After the war, he ran a shoe store in Canajoharie that still stands on Church Street. He died on 24 December 1920 and was buried in Prospect Hill Cemetery in Canajoharie.

In 2012, a shawl was discovered that Cecilia Shubert had made for her son. It has since been returned to Shubert's descendants.

== Military service ==
Shubert enlisted in the Army as a sergeant on 15 August 1861 in Canajoharie and was mustered into Company E of the 43rd New York Infantry on 31 August. He was reduced to private on 18 July 1862 but was repromoted to sergeant on 1 May 1863 before reenlisting on 24 December 1863. He was wounded on 19 October 1864 at Cedar Creek, Virginia. He was promoted to first lieutenant on 7 May 1865 but never commanded the rank, instead being mustered as a second lieutenant on 11 May 1865. He was awarded the Medal of Honor on 10 May 1865 for capturing two markers at the Third Battle of Petersburg on 2 April 1865. His Medal of Honor citation reads:

The President of the United States of America, in the name of Congress, takes pleasure in presenting the Medal of Honor to Sergeant Frank Shubert, United States Army, for extraordinary heroism on 2 April 1865, while serving with Company E, 43d New York Infantry, in action at Petersburg, Virginia, for capture of two markers.

— E. M. Stanton, Secretary of War

Shubert was mustered out of the Army on 27 June 1865 at Washington D.C.
