= James K. Sturgeon =

American soldier during Civil War

Private James Knox Sturgeon
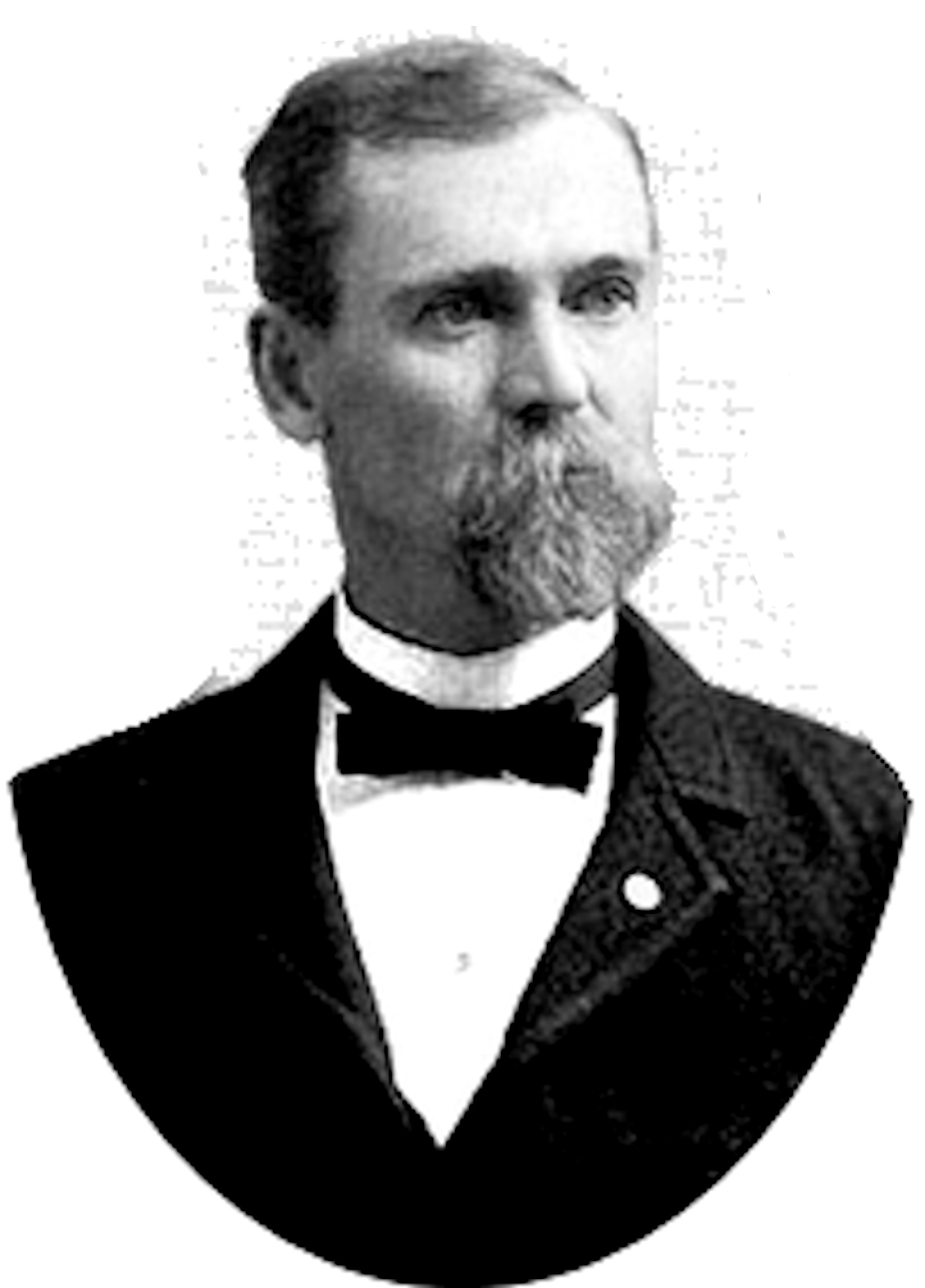
- Born: 5 November 1844; Perry County, Ohio
- Died: 19 August 1899 (aged 54); Los Angeles, California
- Burial place: Evergreen Cemetery, Los Angeles, California
- Military career
- Allegiance: United States (Union)
- Branch: Army
- Service years: 1861-1865
- Rank: Private
- Units: Company F, 46th Ohio Infantry
- Conflicts: Battle of Kenesaw Mountain, Georgia
- Awards: Medal of Honor

James Knox Sturgeon (5 November 1844 – 19 August 1899) was a private of the United States Army who was awarded the Medal of Honor for gallantry during the American Civil War. He was awarded the medal on 2 January 1895 for actions performed at the Battle of Kenesaw Mountain on 15 June 1864.

== Personal life ==
Sturgeon was born on 5 November 1844 in Perry County, Ohio to parents James Sturgeon and Esther Radabaugh. He was one of 5 children. He married Minerva Jane Miller and fathered three children. He died on 19 August 1899 in Los Angeles, California and was buried in Evergreen Cemetery in Los Angeles.

== Military service ==
Sturgeon enlisted in the Army as a private on 9 December 1861 in Lancaster, Ohio and was assigned to Company F of the 46th Ohio Infantry on 16 December 1861.

On 15 June 1864, at the Battle of Kenesaw Mountain in Georgia, the 46th Ohio, along with other Union units, was ordered to assault a well-defended Confederate position a few miles north of the town of Marietta, Georgia. According to Sturgeon, the Confederates scattered during the initial Union charge and much of his regiment was tied up processing those who had surrendered. Sturgeon, along with three other men, rounded up the Confederates who had fled, eventually capturing nearly 30 prisoners.

Sturgeon's Medal of Honor citation reads:

The President of the United States of America, in the name of Congress, takes pleasure in presenting the Medal of Honor to Private James K. Sturgeon, United States Army, for extraordinary heroism on 15 June 1864, while serving with Company F, 46th Ohio Infantry, in action at Kenesaw Mountain, Georgia. Private Sturgeon advanced beyond the lines, and in an encounter with three Confederates shot two and took the other prisoner.

— D. S. Lamont, Secretary of War

Sturgeon was later wounded in the left forearm at Jonesboro, Georgia on 31 August 1864 and was eventually discharged for wounds on 18 May 1865 at Louisville, Kentucky.
