= John Rountry =

- Born: 1843
- Died: 3 October 1901 (aged 57-58); New York, New York
- Burial place: Holy Cross Cemetery, Brooklyn, New York
- Military career
- Allegiance: United States (Union)
- Branch: Navy
- Service years: unknown
- Rank: First Class Fireman
- Unit: USS Montauk
- Awards: Medal of Honor

John Rountry (1843 - 3 October 1901) was a first class fireman of the United States Navy who was awarded the Presidential Medal of Honor for gallantry during the American Civil War. Rountry was awarded the medal on 22 June 1865 for actions performed near Port Royal, South Carolina on 21 September 1864.

== Personal life ==
Rountry was born in 1843. He died on 3 October 1901 in New York City, New York, and was buried in Holy Cross Cemetery in Brooklyn, New York.

== Military service ==
Rountry served on the USS Montauk during the war. On the night of 21 September, a fire was discovered in the magazine storage of the ship, leading to panic among the crew members. Rountry forced his way through the crowd and was able to put out the fire.

Rountry's Medal of Honor citation reads:

The President of the United States of America, in the name of Congress, takes pleasure in presenting the Medal of Honor to Fireman First Class John Rountry, United States Navy, for extraordinary heroism while serving as First Class Fireman on board the U.S.S. Montauk, 21 September 1864, at Port Royal, South Carolina. During the night of 21 September when fire was discovered in the magazine lightroom of that vessel, causing a panic and demoralizing the crew, Rountry, notwithstanding the cry of "fire in the magazine," forced his way with hose in hand, through the frightened crowd to the lightroom and put out the flames.

— E. M. Stanton, Secretary of War
