= John Simmons (Medal of Honor) =

American soldier (died 1891)

John Simmons (died January 6, 1891) was an American soldier and recipient of the Medal of Honor who received the award for his actions in the American Civil War.

== Biography ==
Simmons was born in Bethel, New York, in an unknown year. He served as a private in Company D, 2nd New York Volunteer Heavy Artillery Regiment after enlisting at Liberty, New York, during the Civil War. He earned his medal in action at the Battle of Sayler's Creek in Virginia on April 6, 1865, for "Capture of flag.". He received his medal on April 24, 1865. He died on January 6, 1891, and is now buried in Andes Cemetery, Andes, New York.
