= John Shiel (Medal of Honor) =

Sergeant John Shiel
- Born: May 1828; Scotland
- Died: 11 June 1908 (aged 80); Philadelphia, Pennsylvania
- Burial place: Greenmount Cemetery, Philadelphia, Pennsylvania
- Military career
- Allegiance: United States (Union)
- Branch: Army
- Service years: 1861-1865
- Rank: Sergeant
- Units: Company E, 90th Pennsylvania Infantry
- Conflicts: Fredericksburg, Virginia
- Awards: Medal of Honor

John Shiel (also known as John Shields and John Spiel, May 1828 - 11 June 1908) was a sergeant in the United States Army who was awarded the Medal of Honor for gallantry during the American Civil War. Shiel was awarded the medal on 21 January 1897 for actions performed at the Battle of Fredericksburg on 13 December 1862.

== Personal life ==
Shiel was born in May 1828 in Scotland. He married Ellen J. Barlow in 1874 and fathered one son, Arthur Winfield Shiel. Shiel died on 11 June 1908 in Philadelphia, Pennsylvania and was buried in Greenmount Cemetery in Philadelphia.

== Military service ==
Upon enlistment into the Army, Shiel was assigned to Company E of the 90th Pennsylvania Infantry. His unit was involved in the Battle of Fredericksburg in Virginia. Shiel earned his medal on 13 December 1862, the second day of the battle.

Shiel's Medal of Honor citation reads:

The President of the United States of America, in the name of Congress, takes pleasure in presenting the Medal of Honor to Corporal John Shiel (Shields), United States Army, for extraordinary heroism on 13 December 1862, while serving with Company E, 90th Pennsylvania Infantry, in action at Fredericksburg, Virginia. Corporal Shiel carried a dangerously wounded comrade into the Union lines, thereby preventing his capture by the enemy.

— R. A. Alger, Secretary of War
