= William Shepherd (Medal of Honor) =

United States Army Medal of Honor recipient

Sergeant William Shepherd
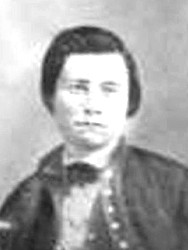
- Born: c. 1837
- Died: 19 March 1899; Dillsboro, Indiana
- Burial place: Conaway Family Cemetery, Dillsboro, Indiana
- Military career
- Allegiance: United States (Union)
- Branch: Army
- Rank: Sergeant
- Units: Company A, 3rd Indiana Cavalry
- Conflicts: Battle of Sailor's Creek
- Awards: Medal of Honor

William Shepherd (c. 1837 - 19 March 1899) was a sergeant in the United States Army who was awarded the Medal of Honor for gallantry during the American Civil War. He was awarded the medal on 3 May 1865 for actions performed at the Battle of Sailor's Creek on 6 April 1865.

== Personal life ==
Shepherd was born in 1837. He died on 19 March 1899 in Dillsboro, Indiana and was buried in Conaway Family Cemetery in Dillsboro.

== Military service ==
Shepherd's Medal of Honor citation reads:

The President of the United States of America, in the name of Congress, takes pleasure in presenting the Medal of Honor to Private William Shepherd, United States Army, for extraordinary heroism on 6 April 1865, while serving with Company A, 3d Indiana Cavalry, in action at Deatonsville (Sailor's Creek), Virginia, for capture of flag.

— E. M. Stanton, Secretary of War
