= John S. Shellenberger =

American Civil War Medal of Honor recipient

Corporal John S. Shellenberger
- Born: 30 August 1839; Fayette County, Pennsylvania, US
- Died: 16 January 1911 (aged 71); Ohio, US
- Burial place: Welsh Hills Cemetery, Granville, Ohio
- Military career
- Allegiance: United States
- Branch: Army
- Service years: 1861-1865
- Rank: Corporal
- Units: Company B, 85th Pennsylvania Infantry Regiment
- Conflicts: Deep Run, Virginia
- Awards: Medal of Honor

John S. Shellenberger (also Shallenberger, 30 August 1839 - 16 January 1911) was a corporal in the United States Army who was awarded the Presidential Medal of Honor for gallantry during the American Civil War. He was awarded the medal on 6 April 1865 for actions performed at the Battle of Deep Run in Virginia on 16 August 1864.

== Personal life ==
Shellenberger was born on 30 August 1839 in Fayette County, Pennsylvania. His home of record was Perryopolis, Pennsylvania. After the war, he worked as a farm laborer in Ohio. He died at the age of 71 on 16 January 1911 in Granville, Ohio.

== Military service ==
Shellenberger enlisted in the Army as a corporal on 12 November 1861 at Perryopolis and was mustered into Company B of the 85th Pennsylvania Infantry. During a charge on Confederate positions in which his unit suffered heavy casualties, Shellenberger was able to capture a Confederate regimental flag and became one of the 3 soldiers in his unit to be awarded the Medal of Honor.

Shellenberger's Medal of Honor citation reads:

The President of the United States of America, in the name of Congress, takes pleasure in presenting the Medal of Honor to Corporal John Shellenberger, United States Army, for extraordinary heroism on 16 August 1864, while serving with Company B, 85th Pennsylvania Infantry, in action at Deep Run, Virginia, for capture of flag.

— E. M. Stanton, Secretary of War

== Notes ==
In 2013, Pennsylvania's state legislature redesignated a section of the Mon Valley Expressway Interchange in Fayette County (Exit 18) the John S. Shellenberger Exchange.
