= Alfred Ramsbottom =

Alfred Ransbottom
- Born: 1831; South Zanesville, Muskingham County, Ohio
- Died: April 14, 1893 (aged 61–62); Hamilton County, Ohio
- Burial place: Roseville, Muskingum County, Ohio
- Military career
- Allegiance: United States of America
- Branch: United States Army
- Rank: First Sergeant
- Units: Company K, 97th Ohio Infantry
- Conflicts: Battle of Franklin; American Civil War
- Awards: Medal of Honor

First Sergeant Alfred Ramsbottom (1831 – April 14, 1893) was an American soldier who fought in the American Civil War. Ramsbottom received his country's highest award for bravery during combat, the Medal of Honor. Ramsbottom's medal was won for his actions in the Battle of Franklin on June 17, 1864. He was honored with the award on February 24, 1865.

Ramsbottom was born in Delaware County, Ohio.

== Medal of Honor citation ==
Citation: Captured the flag of the 2d Mississippi Infantry (C.S.A.), in a hand-to-hand fight with the color bearer.

== See also ==
- List of American Civil War Medal of Honor recipients: M–P
