= Thomas Robinson (Medal of Honor, 1864) =

Thomas Robinson (? - ?) was an Irish born soldier in the Union Army who was awarded the Medal of Honor during the American Civil War. He was awarded the medal for "Capture of flag in a hand-to-hand conflict" on May 12, 1864, at the Battle of Spotsylvania Courthouse whilst serving as a private in the 81st Pennsylvania Infantry. He was awarded the medal on December 1, 1864.
