= William H. Raymond =

American soldier

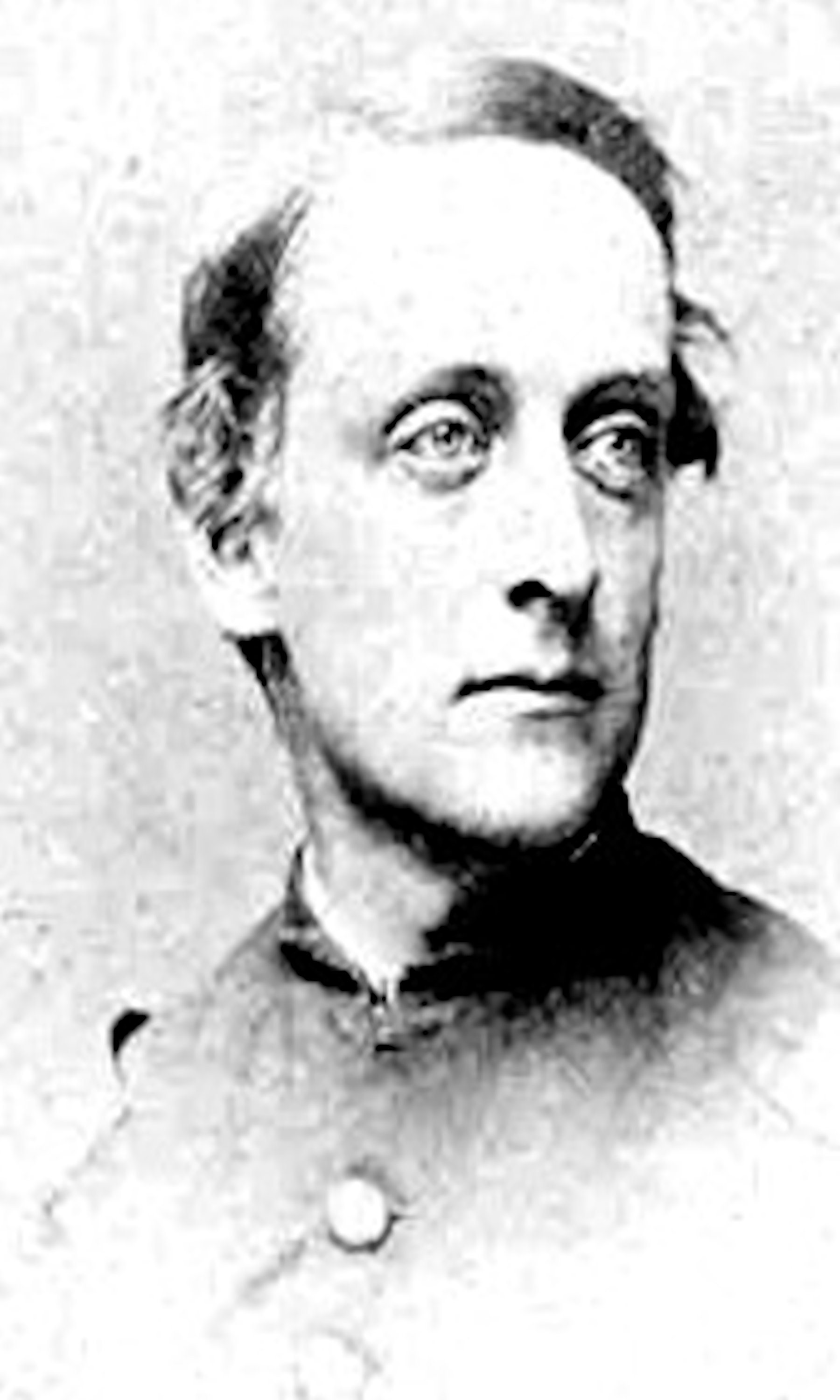
- Born: May 30, 1844; Penfield, New York, US
- Died: December 7, 1916 (aged 72); Washington, D.C., US
- Burial place: Arlington National Cemetery
- Military career
- Allegiance: United States
- Branch: US Army
- Rank: Second Lieutenant
- Units: Company A, 108th New York Volunteer Infantry
- Conflicts: Battle of Gettysburg; American Civil War
- Awards: Medal of Honor

William H. Raymond (May 30, 1844 – December 7, 1916) was an American soldier who fought with the Union Army in the American Civil War. Raymond received his country's highest award for bravery during combat, the Medal of Honor, for actions taken on July 3, 1863 during the Battle of Gettysburg.

== Medal of Honor citation ==
The President of the United States of America, in the name of Congress, takes pleasure in presenting the Medal of Honor to Corporal William H. Raymond, United States Army, for extraordinary heroism on 3 July 1863, while serving with Company A, 108th New York Infantry, in action at Gettysburg, Pennsylvania. Corporal Raymond voluntarily and under a severe fire brought a box of ammunition to his comrades on the skirmish line.

== Personal life ==
Raymond had three children with Olive A. Raymond following the war. He moved to Washington D.C. in 1900 when he was appointed a clerk in the census bureau. He was buried in Arlington National Cemetery.
