= USS Commodore (1863) =

Gunboat of the United States Navy

History

United States
- Laid down: date unknown
- Launched: 1863
- Acquired: 1863
- In service: 31 July 1863
- Out of service: 1865
- Stricken: 1865 (est.)
- Fate: Sold, 12 August 1865

General characteristics
- Displacement: 80 tons
- Length: not known
- Beam: not known
- Draught: not known
- Propulsion: steam engine; side wheel-propelled
- Speed: not known
- Complement: 56
- Armament: one 20-pounder rifle; one 12-pounder rifle; one 24-pounder howitzer; one 12-pounder howitzer

The first USS Commodore was a steamer acquired by the Union Navy during the American Civil War. She was used by the Union Navy to patrol navigable waterways of the Confederacy to prevent the South from trading with other countries.

== Civil War service ==
Commodore, a side wheel steamer, was built at New Orleans, Louisiana, and fitted for service with the West Gulf Blockading Squadron during 1863. On 31 July 1863 Acting Master John R. Hamilton was ordered to her command with instructions to patrol in Lake Pontchartrain, Louisiana. The small steamer remained there throughout the war.

== Renamed Fort Gaines ==
She was renamed Fort Gaines on 1 September 1864.

== Post-war decommissioning and disposal ==
Commodore was sold at New Orleans, 12 August 1865 to a private company in Wilmington, NC. She later sank on the shore of the Cape Fear River's Eagle Island in the Wilmington Harbor not far from the current museum ship USS North Carolina.

Prior to sinking, after decommissioning, the ship was renamed the “waccamaw”, and used as a river ferry.

== See also ==
- Union Navy
