= 5th New York Cavalry Regiment =

5th New York Cavalry in the American Civil War 1861–1865

5th Regiment New York Volunteer Cavalry
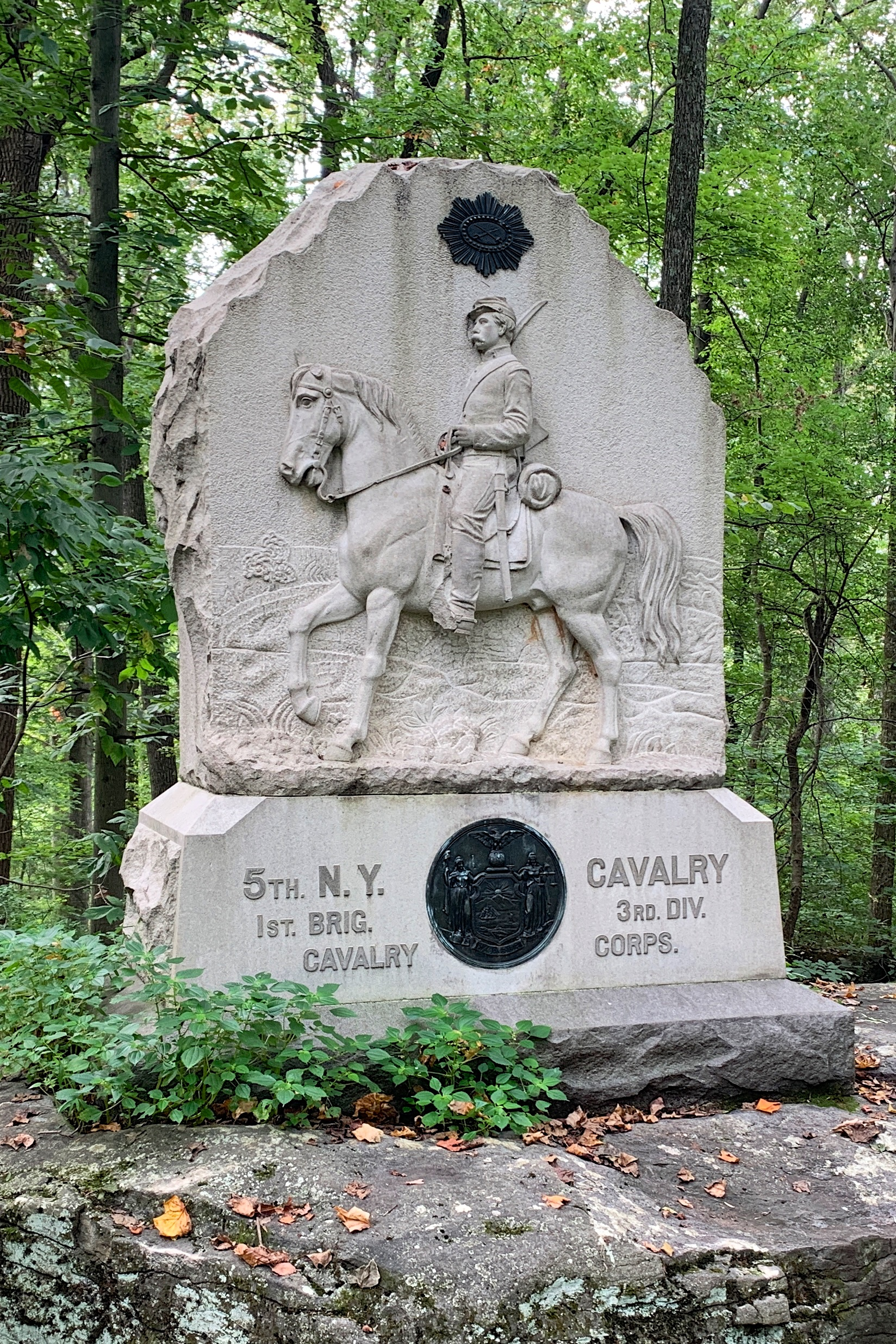
- 5th NY Cavalry monument at Gettysburg
- Active: November 18, 1861, to July 19, 1865
- Country: United States
- Allegiance: (Union (American Civil War)) Union (New York (state)) New York
- Branch: Union Army
- Type: Cavalry
- Size: Regiment
- Engagements: American Civil War; 1862; Battle of Front Royal (2 co.); First Battle of Winchester; First Battle of Rappahannock Station; Second Battle of Bull Run; 1863; Battle of Hanover; Battle of Gettysburg; Battle of Williamsport; Battle of Mine Run; 1864; Battle of the Wilderness; Battle of Spotsylvania Court House; Battle of Cold Harbor; Battle of Sappony Church; First Battle of Ream's Station; Third Battle of Winchester, Battle of Tom's Brook; Battle of Cedar Creek; 1865; Battle of Waynesboro, Virginia; Battle of Five Forks; Battle of Appomattox Station; Battle of Appomattox Court House

Commanders
- Colonel: Othniel De Forest 1861–1862
- Lt. Colonel: Robert Johnstone 1862–1863
- Colonel: John Hammond 1863–1864
- Lt. Colonel: William P. Bacon 1864
- Major: Abram H. Krom 1864
- Captain: Elmer J. Barker 1864
- Lt. Colonel: Theo. A. Boice 1864
- Colonel: Amos H. White 1864-1865

The 5th New York Cavalry Regiment, also known as the 5th Regiment New York Volunteer Cavalry and nicknamed the "1st Ira Harris Guards", was a cavalry regiment of the Union Army during the American Civil War. The regiment had a good fighting reputation, and had important roles in the Battle of Hanover and the Battle of the Wilderness. It was present at nearly 175 battles and skirmishes, including Gettysburg, Opequon, and Cedar Creek. A majority of its fighting was in Virginia.

The regiment was formed in New York City by Othniel De Forest. Training began in New York before the regiment moved to Annapolis, Maryland. The regiment was originally involved with the defense of Washington, and subsequently served in the Army of the Potomac and then the Army of the Shenandoah. John Hammond began as a captain and finished his military career as commander of the regiment, leading the regiment in battles such as Hanover, Williamsport, the Wilderness, Spotsylvania, and Cold Harbor.

The regiment had 8 officers and 93 men killed or mortally wounded. Disease killed 3 more officers and 222 more enlisted men. Among the prisons where captured members of the regiment were kept were Libby Prison in Richmond and Andersonville Prison in Georgia. The regiment was commanded by eight different men, although two were in command for only a few days. The Medal of Honor was awarded to six of the regiment's soldiers.

== Formation and organization ==
Between December 20, 1860, and February 1, 1861, seven southern states seceded from the United States and formed the Confederate States of America. Fighting began on April 12, 1861, when American troops were attacked at Fort Sumter in South Carolina. This is considered the beginning of the American Civil War. Four additional states, including Virginia, seceded during the next three months.

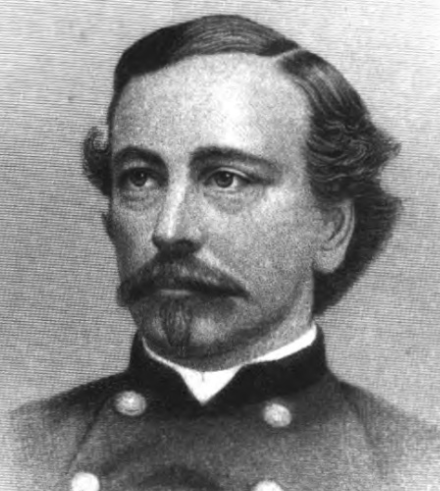
Col. De Forest

Othniel De Forest, of New York City, began recruiting for a federal volunteer regiment of cavalry during July 1861. (Note: De Forest's name is spelled differently by various sources. The regimental historian spells his name as Othniel De Forest, and that is used herein. The National Park Service spells his name as Othniol De Forest. The state of New York spells his name as Othneil De Forest in an 1895 report by the Adjutant-General. A 1912 report spells the name as Othneil DeForrest.) The regiment was originally called the Ira Harris Guard in honor of the senator from Albany, New York. It was named 5th New York Cavalry on November 14, 1861. The regiment's battle flag was blue with "painted inscriptions and a semi-elliptical red shield in the center" inscribed with "5th." Companies were mustered in from August through October 1861. Additional names used for regiment include Ira Harris Cavalry, First Ira Harris Guard, and De Forest Cavalry. (Note: Burns notes that companies A, B, I, K, and M were originally companies that were raised by militia Col. W. S. Bliss as the nucleus for another regiment, Bliss's Cavalry, but were joined with the 5th New York when their numbers were insufficient for their own regiment. These men were recruited from the New York City metropolitan area. Company D was formed from excess men from volunteer cavalry regiments raised in Connecticut and Massachusetts. The remaining six of the companies were raised from counties in western or upstate counties.) Many of the men were from New York City, but Allegany, Essex, Orange, Tioga, and Wyoming counties also contributed. A few men were from Connecticut, Massachusetts, and New Jersey.

De Forest was the original colonel and regimental commander, and his October 1861 command included 50 officers and 1,064 enlisted men. Lieutenant Colonel Robert Johnstone was second in command. Major Philip G. Vought commanded the First Battalion, while Major James Davidson and Major George H. Gardner commanded the Second and Third Battalions, respectively. Training began at Camp Scott in Staten Island. Two of the regiment's three battalions received horses during October. On November 18, the regiment moved by train to Baltimore, where the Third Battalion received its horses and equipment. On November 25, the regiment marched to Annapolis. They established a winter quarters camp nearby (Camp Harris) where more drills were conducted.

== Early action ==
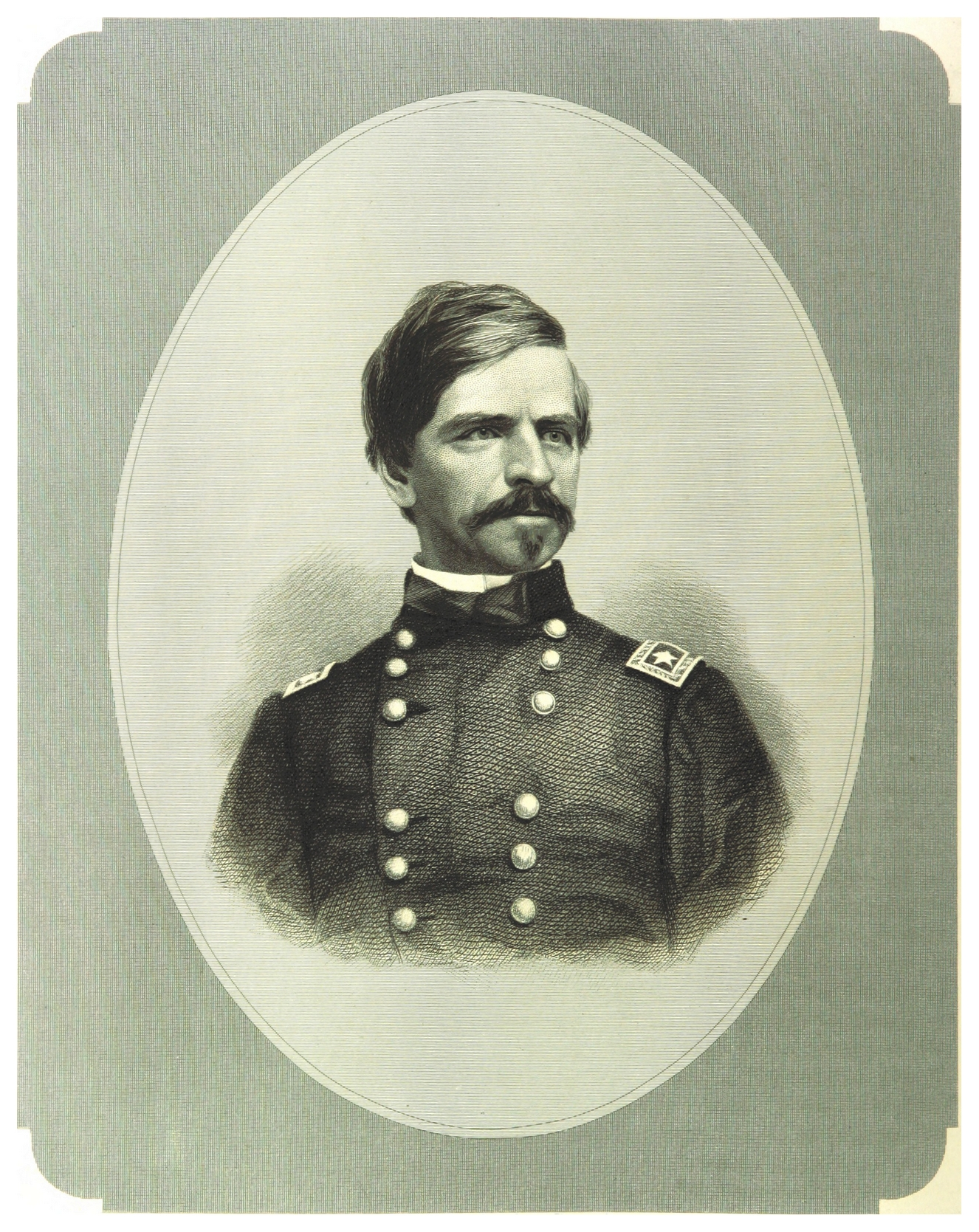
Gen. Banks

On March 31, 1862, the regiment was ordered to join the V Corps under the command of General Nathaniel P. Banks. They were assigned to cavalry commanded by Brigadier General John Porter Hatch in the Department of the Shenandoah. On May 2, the regiment had its first fight and suffered its first loss of personnel. Company A was scouting between Harrisonburg and Port Republic when it found the camp of General Thomas "Stonewall" Jackson. In the skirmish that followed, Private John Beaumont was captured.

By April, the regiment was well equipped. Captain John Hammond believed that they were one of the best–armed cavalry regiments in the field. Arms included Colt pistols, Ames sabers, and a single-shot cavalry rifle. Any poor–quality horses had been replaced, and saddles were McClellan saddles.

On May 3, the regiment reported to Hatch at Harrisonburg, Virginia. A few days later, they were sent to New Market, Virginia. On May 6, they encountered Confederate cavalry led by Colonel Turner Ashby. The 5th New York charged with sabers drawn and drove off their enemy while inflicting 8 killed or wounded and capturing 7. This success helped to establish the good reputation of the regiment. The press said that the regiment "made a good report of themselves" and quoted a prisoner as saying the regiment "fought like devils". The regiment had its first soldier killed in action—Private Asahel A. Spencer of Company E. An additional soldier was wounded.

=== Jackson's trap ===
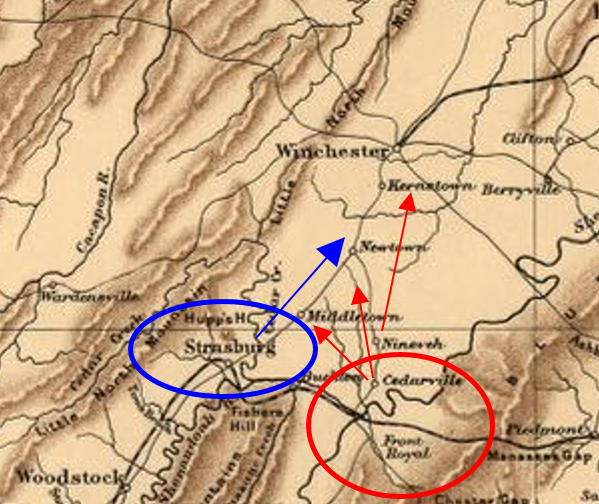
Jackson tried to prevent Banks from escaping to Winchester

On May 15, the regiment began operations in Virginia's Shenandoah Valley. After some skirmishes, Banks settled the V Corps (including the 5th New York Cavalry) in Strasburg, Virginia. Banks also stationed about 1,000 infantry men 10 miles (16 km) east at Front Royal under the command of Colonel John R. Kenly. (Note: Today's Front Royal driving tour says Kenly had about 1,000 men. Major Vought's report says Kenly had "less than 500 infantry, with only two pieces of artillery".) On May 23, Banks sent Company B and Company D from the 5th New York Cavalry to Front Royal to fulfill an overdue request from Kenly for cavalry. This small cavalry force numbered about 100, and was under the command of Major Vought. Banks was unaware that Kenly was about to be attacked by a force that outnumbered him by 20 to 1.

Vought's men arrived at Front Royal about one hour after Kenly was attacked by a division under the command of General Richard S. Ewell that was sent to reinforce Jackson's "Stonewall Brigade". Jackson was also nearby. After about two hours of fighting and the approach of enemy cavalry, Kenly and Vought began a retreat north, with Vought's cavalry as the rear guard. Vought's men were outnumbered, nearly surrounded, and suffered numerous casualties in the retreat. (Note: On May 23, 1862, at Front Royal, the 5th New York Cavalry had one officer killed and two captured. Two enlisted men were killed, 15 wounded, and 18 captured.) Kenly and Vought retreated north just past Cedarville, attempting to fight off the 6th Virginia Cavalry. Fewer than 100 of Kenly's original force escaped, and Kenly was wounded and captured. The result of the fighting at Front Royal and Cedarville was lopsided: Kenly's force had an estimated 904 casualties, while the Confederates had 56.

After receiving dispatches from Vought, Banks realized that Jackson was trying to position his army between Banks and Winchester, which would isolate Banks and cut his supply line. (Note: Sergeant Charles H. Greenleaf from the 5th New York Cavalry's Company D brought dispatches from Front Royal to Strasburg that made Banks aware of Jackson's potential flanking movement. Greenleaf's action led Banks to recommend him for promotion, and he was commissioned second lieutenant on August 26 to rank from July 27.) Thus, both forces raced to Winchester—Banks to escape and Jackson to trap Banks. Colonel De Forest and six companies were assigned rear guard duty plus the additional task of destroying any supplies that could not be salvaged. After De Forest began moving north, he discovered that his command and additional soldiers had their route on the Shenandoah Pike blocked by Confederate troops, which caused them to be separated from Banks' main force. De Forest used mountain roads west of the pike to evade the Confederates, and eventually reunited a battery and 32 wagons of supplies with Banks at Williamsport—a retreat of 84 miles (135 km) that ended in the relative safety of Maryland.

While De Forest moved north on the mountain roads, Banks was attacked several times on the Valley Pike while hurrying to Winchester. His outnumbered army was soundly defeated at Winchester on May 25, and he escaped across the Potomac River mostly because Jackson's men and horses were exhausted from the chase. During the three days from May 23 through May 25, the 5th New York Cavalry suffered 38 casualties at Front Royal, 6 at Middletown, 7 at Newtown-Crossroads, and 10 at Winchester. One major resigned a few days later. (Note: Major Davidson resigned on May 28. He was replaced by Captain William P. Pratt, whose July 18 promotion to major was retroactive to May 28.) Eventually it was discovered that Confederate spy Belle Boyd played an important role in Banks' defeat by providing information to her side from inside Union lines.

=== Back to Virginia ===
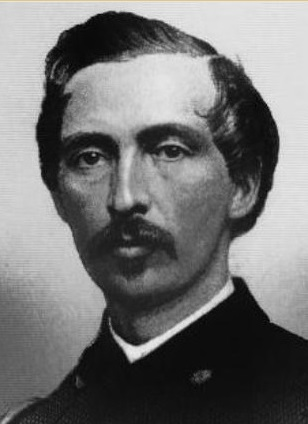
Col. J. Hammond

By the end of May, the regiment was back in Virginia, and during June it became part of the II Corps, Army of Virginia. On July 1, another major resigned. (Note: Major Vought resigned effective July 1. He was replaced by Captain Washington Wheeler, whose July 18 commission as major was effective June 21.) The regiment's most prominent actions of July and August in terms of casualties were at Barnett's Ford and Orange Court House. On July 18, Company A had 1 officer and 22 enlisted men captured, plus 1 wounded, while on picket at Barnett's Ford. At Orange Court House, brigade commander General Samuel W. Crawford sent the regiment at a slow pace into a seemingly empty town—only to have it ambushed by Confederates under cover. Colonel De Forest was harassed by a dozen Confederates, but was saved by bugler Conrad Bohrer of Company I who fell and died from a saber wound after his horse was shot. A flanking party of three companies commanded by Captain Hammond charged into town from the opposite end and drove the Confederates away. The regiment captured 47 men from the 7th Virginia Cavalry, including its commanding officer. Casualties for the regiment were 1 officer wounded, 2 enlisted men killed, 9 enlisted men wounded, and 11 enlisted men captured.

On August 24 and 25, the regiment was involved in the First Battle of Rappahannock Station. Private John Tribe of Company G was later awarded the Medal of Honor for extraordinary heroism in this battle at Waterloo Bridge where he helped destroy the bridge while under enemy fire. On August 27, three companies were detached as the escort of General Samuel P. Heintzelman, while the remaining portion of the regiment became the escort of General John Pope, commander of the Army of Virginia. On the next day, one of the companies was made escort for General Banks. As Pope's escort, seven companies of the regiment were present at the Second Battle of Bull Run (also known as the Battle of Second Manassas). Casualties were low for the regiment—one killed and one captured.

== Defense of Washington ==
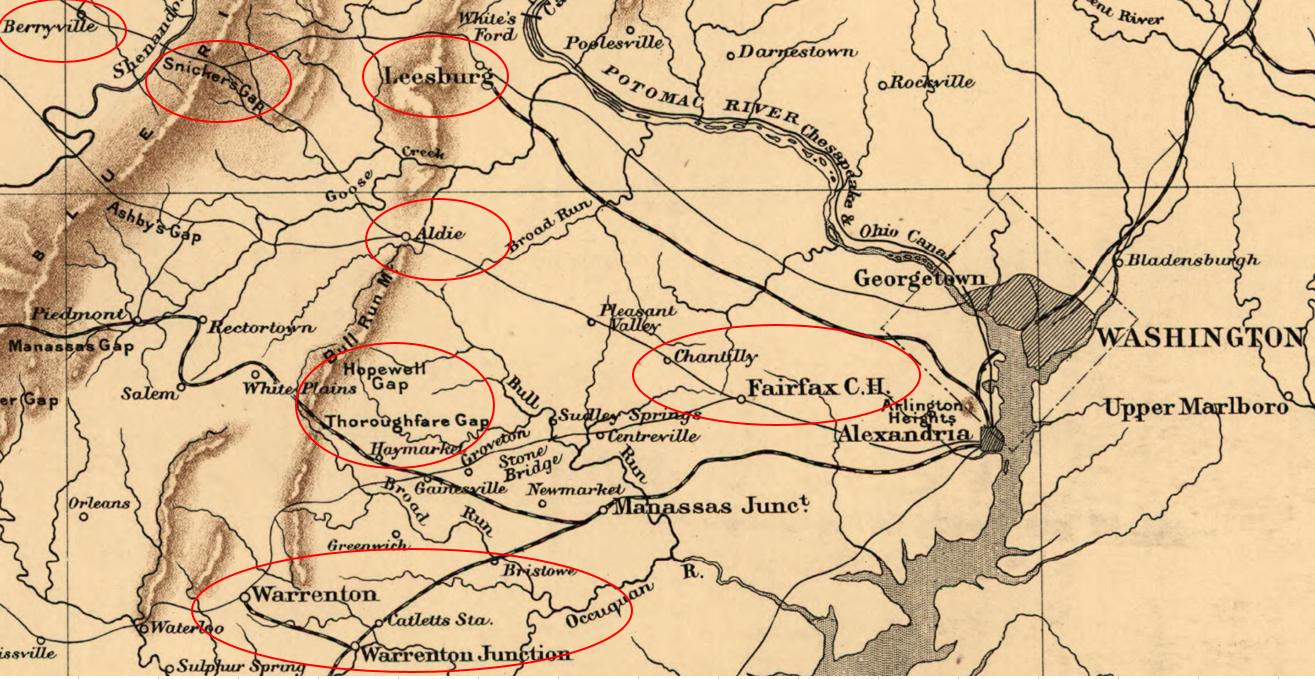
Area patrolled by 5th NY Cavalry September 1862 to May 1863

In September 1862, the regiment was assigned to the defenses of Washington, D.C., as part of Wyndham's Cavalry Brigade. This corresponds closely to the time Colonel De Forest was relieved of command of the regiment. Lieutenant Colonel Johnstone is listed as taking command of the regiment on September 10, 1862. Major Washington Wheeler, who had received his commission as major in July, resigned on September 26. Captain Hammond replaced Wheeler, receiving his commission as major on October 10 effective September 26.

Much of the regiment's time in the autumn of 1862 was spent scouting or on picket duty between Washington, D.C., and the Blue Ridge Mountains. Although Johnstone led an October 8 expedition that did not meet any opposition, the regiment was often led in the field by Major Hammond or Captain Abram Krom. One of the more successful endeavors happened on November 29 at Snicker's Ferry when Krom led the regiment as it drove away Confederate snipers harassing the regiment as it attempted to cross the Shenandoah River. After a pursuit of 3 miles (4.8 km), Krom discovered Confederate camps. With the assistance of reinforcements, the Confederates were defeated and numerous men and supplies were captured—including 3 officers, 32 enlisted men, 60 horses, 50 head of cattle, wagons, and ambulances.

Turnover continued with the regiment's top officers. Major Gardner resigned November 1—the last of the three original battalion commanders to leave the regiment. (Note: The last of the three original majors left the regiment November 1, 1862, and two more majors were gone by January 30, 1863. By the end of the war, the regiment had 5 officers dismissed and 37 who resigned.CITEREFNYSMM,_5th_Cavalry:_Historical_Sketch_(2019) One author states that this loss of officers is "quite high", although some of it is the normal first–year elimination of those who were not as competent as expected. The same author believes a "conscious effort by those knowledgeable of the situation" was made to keep some misbehavior by the regiment's leadership from tarnishing the regiment's "hard-won reputation as a superior volunteer fighting command". Although he does not specify any of the majors, he cites a letter written home by a private that says officer commissions in the regiment were being sold, including one to a lieutenant that did not know how to mount a horse. The regiment's original colonel and lieutenant colonel had some unexplained leave of absences, and were arrested and eventually cashiered (at different times). Colonel De Forest was eventually cleared of wrongdoing.) First Lieutenant (and battalion adjutant) William P. Bacon was commissioned major on November 25 to rank from November 1. Another major, William Pratt (who had replaced Major Davidson less than a year earlier), resigned January 30, 1863. He was replaced by Captain Amos White who was promoted to major on February 5 to rank from February 2. In February, the regiment became part of Price's Independent Cavalry Brigade, XXII Army Corps, Department of Washington.

=== Mosby ===
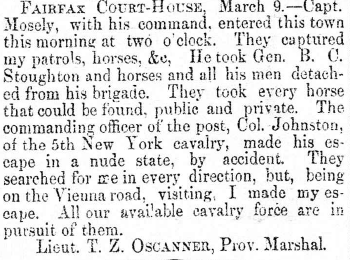
Mosby's Fairfax Courthouse Raid

By 1863, much of the regiment's fighting was against guerrilla warriors known as Mosby's Rangers, who were under the command of John S. Mosby. The regiment considered Mosby's force "very formidable", and a strong picket line was necessary around the Union lines near Washington. Late at night on March 9, Mosby conducted a raid at Fairfax Courthouse that was intended to capture Colonel Percy Wyndham and horses. Mosby captured numerous sleeping soldiers and horses, but Wyndham had already left for Washington. Johnstone was in temporary command of Wyndham's brigade, and was staying in town at a private residence. Also stationed in town was Brigadier General Edwin H. Stoughton. The sleeping Stoughton was captured—as was Captain Augustus J. Barker of the 5th New York Cavalry, who had been temporarily assigned to Wyndham's brigade staff. Mosby, with his prisoners and extra horses, rode by the house where Johnstone was staying. Johnstone, awakened by the noise of the horses, yelled out the window—wanting to know why so much cavalry was moving around late at night. After some laughter, Mosby's men entered the house and attempted to capture Johnstone. Johnstone's wife fought his would-be captors while he escaped from the house and hid "nude by accident" under an outhouse. Only Johnstone's uniforms were captured. This was Mosby's most famous raid.

In April, the regiment became part of the Third Brigade, Stahel's Cavalry Division, XXII Army Corps. On May 3, the 5th New York faced Mosby again—this time at Warrenton Junction. About 40 men from the regiment, led by Major Hammond, surprised Mosby's men after they had surprised a detachment of about 100 men from the 1st (West) Virginia Cavalry. Most of Mosby's prisoners were rescued, and Mosby had significant losses. Hammond's leadership was complimented by Mosby himself, who wrote when discussing a different skirmish with the 6th Michigan Cavalry that if they had "followed the example of Major Hammond with the 5th New York, at Warrenton Junction, and charged us when we were in disorder and scattered over the field, that would in all probability have been my last day as a partisan commander". Captain Krom's courage and fighting ability at Warrenton Junction were complimented in a New York newspaper that said he was wounded in the leg and face, and his horse killed, yet he "used his sabre with terrible effect upon the enemy".

== Gettysburg Campaign ==
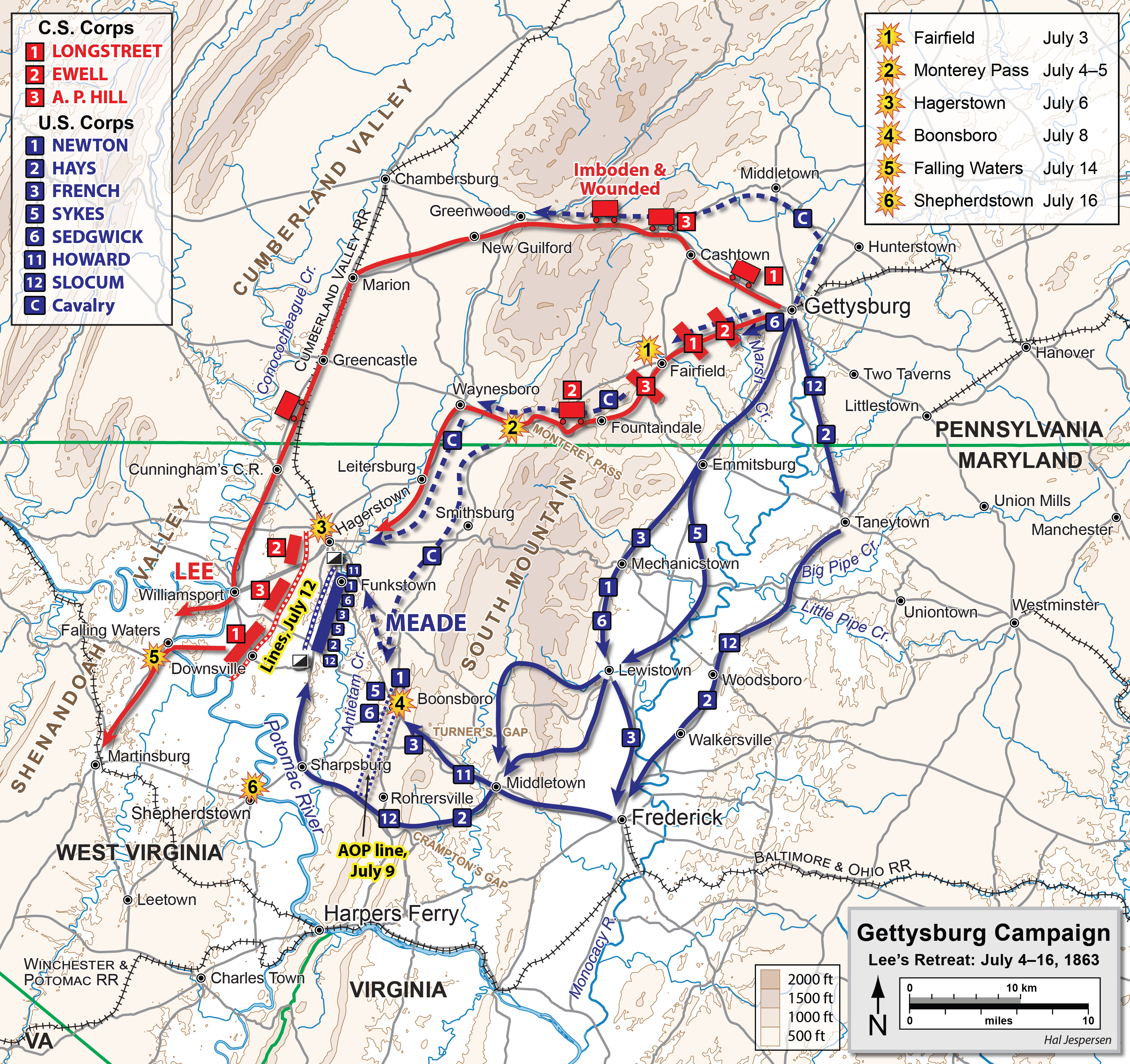
Retreat from Gettysburg

Major Hammond replaced Johnstone as regiment commander on June 1 according to the regimental historian. In early June, Stahel's cavalry division was detached from defending Washington so that it could help the Army of the Potomac defend the northern states from an invasion by Robert E. Lee's Army of Northern Virginia. On June 21 the division began moving west, and crossed the Potomac River into Maryland on June 25. The entire Union army force was reorganized on June 28, and Stahel's division (including the 5th New York Cavalry) became the 3rd Division of the Cavalry Corps, Army of the Potomac. Brigadier General Judson Kilpatrick was named the new division's commander. The First Brigade consisted of the following cavalry regiments: 1st Vermont, 1st (West) Virginia, 18th Pennsylvania, and 5th New York. Brigadier General Elon J. Farnsworth commanded the brigade as a replacement for De Forest, who was ill. Brigadier General George Armstrong Custer commanded the Second Brigade, which consisted of regiments from Michigan. At his request, General Joseph Hooker was relieved of command of the Army of the Potomac, and he was replaced by General George Meade.

=== Battle of Hanover ===
Kilpatrick's division was detached eastward as the army moved from Frederick, Maryland, to Pennsylvania. Most of the division had already passed through the small town of Hanover, Pennsylvania, when the regiment in the rear, the 18th Pennsylvania, was attacked by a large cavalry force under the command of General James Ewell Brown "Jeb" Stuart. Major Hammond was commanding the 5th New York, which was ahead of the 18th Pennsylvania and already in the streets of the town, while portions of the 18th Pennsylvania had not yet entered.

The attack began with an artillery shot, and soon Union soldiers faced first the 13th Virginia Cavalry, then a battalion from the 2nd North Carolina Cavalry, and finally the 9th Virginia Cavalry. Hammond responded with "his accustomed coolness" and led the resistance (which included a charge with sabers drawn) until Farnsworth and Kilpatrick arrived. After close fighting, the Confederates withdrew to the cover of their artillery in the hills. The streets were full of dead and wounded men and horses. Kilpatrick directed a counterattack by portions of Farnsworth's First Brigade and Custer's Second Brigade. The 5th New York's Private Thomas Burke of Company A captured the flag of the 13th Virginia Cavalry while capturing and disarming two Confederates, and he was awarded the Medal of Honor for his action. The counterattack silenced the Confederate big guns, and Stuart's men were driven toward Lee's army. The 5th New York had one officer killed and one officer wounded. Casualties for enlisted men were more numerous: 4 killed, 29 wounded, and 18 became prisoners. This June 30 battle became known as the Battle of Hanover, and casualties for all participants on both sides totaled to 228.

=== Battle of Gettysburg ===
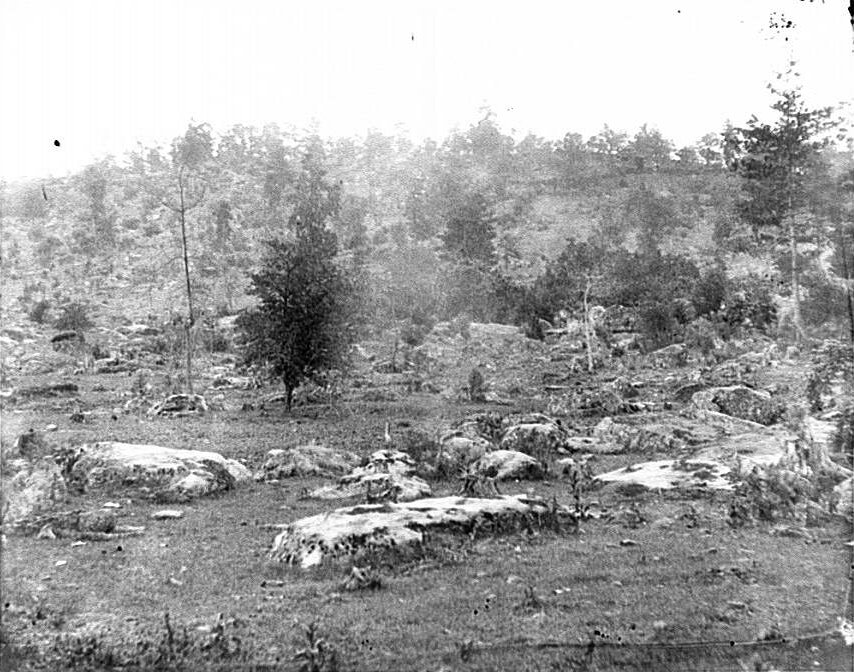
Little Round Top 1863

On July 1, Farnsworth's Brigade was in the Abbottstown-Berlin-Rosetown area of Pennsylvania. It chased enemy cavalry and captured several prisoners. On July 2, the division moved closer to Gettysburg, and was on the extreme right side of the entire Union army—close to New Oxford and Hunterstown. On July 3, the First Brigade moved to the left wing of the army, about 2.5 miles (4.0 km) from Gettysburg near a hill known as Little Round Top. The 5th New York was assigned to protect an artillery battery, while the remaining portion of the brigade made two charges against infantry. Farnsworth was killed in the second charge, and at least one cavalry leader was critical of Kilpatrick's decision to have a mounted charge in terrain that was not ideal for cavalry. This three-day battle became known as the Battle of Gettysburg, and nearly 94,000 Union soldiers fought against over 71,000 Confederate soldiers. Casualties for all participants totaled to about 51,000—the highest for any single battle in the American Civil War.

=== Battle of Williamsport ===
After the Battle of Gettysburg, Lee's army retreated toward Virginia. Several battles and skirmishes occurred as Meade's army pursued Lee. The 5th New York Cavalry suffered significant casualties on July 6 in the Battle of Williamsport (also known as Battle of Hagerstown) in Hagerstown, Maryland, (near the road to Williamsport) as part of Meade's attempt to prevent the escape of Lee's army. Working with the 1st Vermont Cavalry, the two regiments were flanked on both sides and outnumbered. Eventually the two regiments were driven back. Hammond's report estimated that the regiment had about 100 men missing or wounded, and the number of fatalities was unknown. Regimental historian Boudrye later wrote that the regiment had 2 officers wounded and 3 officers captured, plus enlisted men casualties of 3 killed, 8 wounded, and 54 captured.

On July 9, De Forest reported for duty, and took command of the First Brigade. Kilpatrick moved the division to Hagerstown, and the regiment took no casualties in a skirmish there on July 11. Lee's army crossed the Potomac at Williamsport and Falling Waters on July 14. The Army of the Potomac eventually crossed back to Virginia, and the headquarters of the 3rd Division was established near Warrenton. The regiment's next skirmish was at Ashby's Gap in Virginia on July 26.

== Bristoe and Mine Run campaigns ==
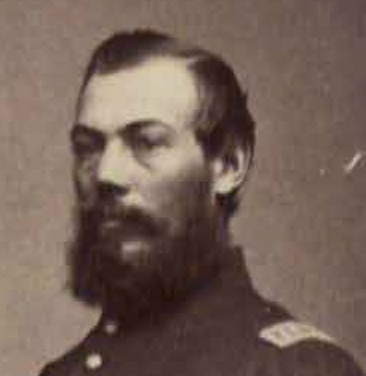
Maj. Abram Krom

A letter written August 14 from Hammond states that Johnstone took command of the regiment on the previous day (August 13, 1863), and complained that Johnstone had "avoided all the labor, dangers and privations of the regiment for nearly three-fourths of a year". The same letter noted that Colonel De Forest had been arrested and taken to New York. (Note: Colonel Othniel De Forest was arrested in 1863 while hospitalized for illness in Washington, DC. He was dismissed on March 24, 1864, by special order No. 131. The order said "By direction of the President, Colonel O. De Forest, 5th New York Cavalry, is hereby dismissed from the service of the United States with disgrace, for presenting false and fraudulent accounts against the Government." He died from illness in December 1864, but in 1866 charges against him were judged to be unfounded and part of someone's "vindictive motives". His dismissal was revoked, and he was restored posthumously to the regiment.) Johnstone was in a foul mood when he returned to the regiment, threatening arrest for anyone hostile to him. By September 3, Johnstone himself was under arrest and did not return. (Note: Hammond noted in September 3 letter that Johnstone was under arrest. After a trial, Johnstone was "out of the service" by mid-October. He was cashiered on December 5, 1863. One author believes Johnstone's problems may have been related to the charges against De Forest and fraud against the army, but the exact details are unknown.) Hammond was back in command, and the regiment's three battalion leaders were Major White, Captain Krom, and Major Bacon. From September until the end of the year, the regiment was present for 19 actions.

For the Bristoe Virginia Campaign beginning October 10, the regiment was in the First Brigade of Kilpatrick's 3rd Division. The brigade was commanded by Brigadier General Henry E. Davies Jr. After some early successes, portions of Kilpatrick's brigade were partially surrounded on October 19 in the Battle of Buckland Mills. The regimental historian believed that without the brigade's skill and daring the "entire command would have been annihilated". The Union cavalry escaped, and the 5th New York Cavalry was involved in fighting off attacking infantry. An October 21 report by Davies mentioned Hammond and White for "distinguished gallantry" at James City, Brandy Station, and New Baltimore—and Lieutenant Theodore A. Boice was mentioned for two scouting missions that obtained much valuable information at Thoroughfare Gap and Aldie.

The Mine Run Campaign began November 26. In this campaign, the regiment was still part of the First Brigade of the 3rd Division, but General George A. Custer was the division commander. Davies remained in command of the brigade, and Hammond commanded the regiment. The regiment faced artillery duels and cold, wet weather. Private Loron F. Packard of Company G was awarded the Medal of Honor for rescuing a soldier from three Confederates at Raccoon Ford on November 27. In Davies' December 3 report, he praised the 5th New York's Captain Krom, whose battalion held off the enemy at Raccoon Ford for six days.

== Dahlgren raid ==
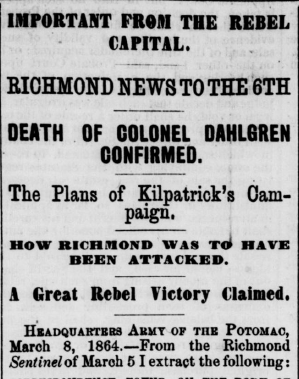
Dahlgren Raid headline

On December 3, 1863, the regiment set up camp near Stevensburg, Virginia. Hammond and Krom went to New York for recruiting, and Krom was promoted to major on December 5. Lieutenant Boice was promoted to captain on December 20. Hammond and Krom did not return until mid-March, but they brought 500 new recruits. On March 24, Hammond received his commission as lieutenant colonel.

While Hammond and Krom were gone, cavalry detachments from the 2nd New York, 5th New York, 1st Vermont, 1st Maine, and 5th Michigan departed Stevensburg, Virginia, on February 28, 1864, for a special mission. This force was under the command of Colonel Ulric Dahlgren and consisted of 400 men. The detachment from the 5th New York was 40 men from companies I and K, and they were commanded by Lieutenant Henry A. D. Merritt. The plan was for Kilpatrick's main Union force to attack Richmond from the north as a diversion, while Dahlgren's command approached from the south. Dahlgren's goal was to liberate prisoners in several prisons (including Libby Prison), destroy mills and warehouses, destroy railroad communications, and capture artillery at Frederick Hall Station on the Virginia Central Railroad. The mission failed and Dahlgren was killed. Of the 40 men from the 5th New York, 14 were captured—and 5 of those captured eventually died at the infamous Andersonville prison in Georgia. Merritt was among the captured. He escaped from a South Carolina prison on November 28, 1864. This failed mission became known as Kilpatrick's Raid or Dahlgren's Raid. There was some controversy over some papers allegedly found on Dahlgren's body that discussed killing Jefferson Davis and burning Richmond. However, both Meade and Kilpatrick said nothing like that was "authorized, sanctioned, or approved".

== Grant's Overland Campaign ==
During March, Ulysses S. Grant became commander of all Union armed forces. Although Grant decided not to replace Meade as commander of the Army of the Potomac, he kept his headquarters with Meade's and provided direction. Philip Sheridan was appointed commander of Meade's cavalry corps. Kilpatrick was assigned to a larger command out west, and he was replaced as commander of Sheridan's 3rd Division by General James H. Wilson. Colonel John B. McIntosh replaced Davies as commander of the cavalry division's First Brigade—which consisted of the 18th Pennsylvania, 1st Connecticut, 2nd New York, and 5th New York cavalries.

=== Battle of the Wilderness ===
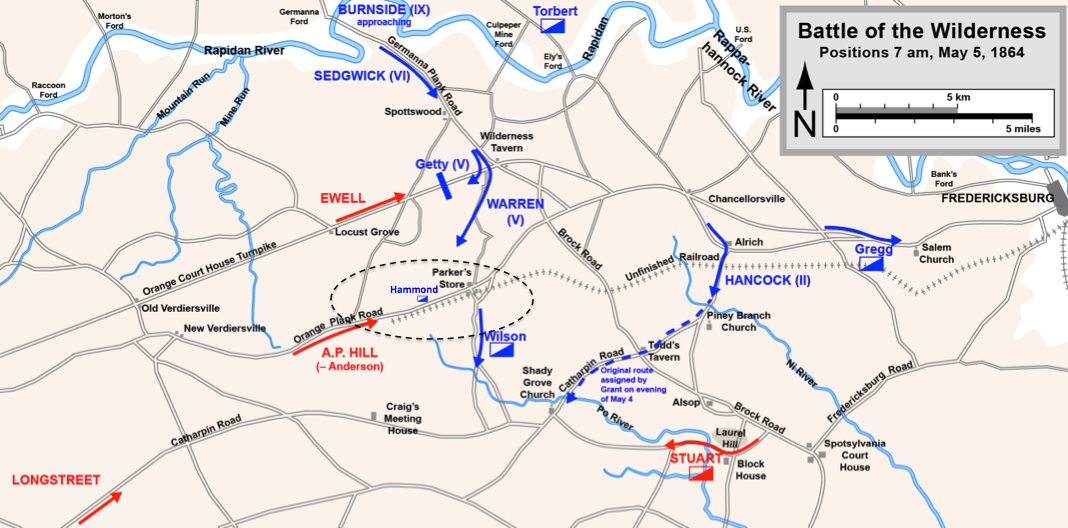
Hammond & 5th NY at the Battle of the Wilderness

The 5th New York Cavalry fought in the early stage of the Battle of the Wilderness. On May 3, the Army of the Potomac received orders to be ready to move at midnight. On the next day, the cavalry moved on the Plank Road toward Chancellorsville, just beyond Wilderness Tavern. The regiment, commanded by Hammond, was detached from Wilson's division with orders to proceed down the Orange Plank Road to Parker's Store and establish a picket line to guard the approach from Mine Run (west). At 5:00 am on May 5, the remainder of the division proceeded southward. Hammond was instructed to patrol the area until relieved by Gouverneur K. Warren's infantry. While most of the regiment began cooking breakfast at Parker's Store, Company I probed west and discovered Confederate infantry. The company's captain sent for, and received, reinforcements. In dismounted skirmishing, the Union cavalrymen were driven back toward Parker's Store. It was soon discovered that they were fighting an entire infantry corps under the command of A. P. Hill.

Hammond's total force consisted of only about 500 men. Hammond understood that the dense woods and the large infantry force made fighting on horseback inadvisable. Thus, the command fought dismounted and spread out as a skirmish line while utilizing their Spencer repeating rifles. The regiment slowly retreated east toward and beyond Parker's Store near the Orange Plank Road. The danger for Meade's army was that if Hill could take control of the intersection of Orange Plank and Brock roads, Warren's V Corps would have large enemy forces on two sides, and General Winfield S. Hancock's II Corps could get isolated from the rest of Meade's army. Hammond was eventually pushed back to the point where Orange Plank Road intersects with Brock Road, but was relieved by infantry from the VI Corps under the command of General George W. Getty. The exhausted 5th New York was nearly out of ammunition and sent about 1 mile (1.6 km) to the rear of the Union front line where it could recuperate and resupply. The regiment had fought a desperate engagement and held off a larger force for five hours—but suffered significant casualties. (Note: Boudrye discusses the engagement in his regimental history. Hammond's delaying action prevented Hill from cutting off Hancock's II Corps. Casualties for the regiment in the Parker's Store area on May 5 were 1 officer killed and 1 officer wounded, 13 enlisted men killed, 22 wounded, and 24 captured.) Confederate prisoners believed they had been fighting an entire brigade. The Battle of the Wilderness continued through May 7 and finished as a draw. Casualties for both armies combined are estimated to be 28,800, including the deaths of Union generals Alexander Hays and James S. Wadsworth—and three Confederate generals. Combined casualties totaled to the fourth highest of any battle in the Civil War.

=== Battle of Spotsylvania Court House ===
For the next two weeks, the fighting shifted southeast toward Spotsylvania Court House. On May 7, the regiment guarded Germania Plank Road. Hammond was ordered by General John Sedgwick to take command of all cavalry on that road, which included the 5th New York, 22nd New York, and 2nd Ohio. Two days later, Sedgwick was killed elsewhere by a sharpshooter. On May 17, Meade sent Hammond 1,200 reinforcements and Hammond's command skirmished along the Po River. Casualties for the regiment from May 7 through May 17 were 7, including 1 officer captured. Although casualties for the regiment were few, this battle's combined casualties were the third highest in the American Civil War.

=== Battle of Cold Harbor ===
On May 28, Hammond was promoted to colonel and Bacon was promoted to lieutenant colonel. The regiment fought in the Battle of Cold Harbor, which began May 31 and lasted through June 12. In this Confederate victory, the Union Army had about 12,000 casualties while the Confederates had about 4,000. On June 1, Wilson's 3rd Division (5th New York was in McIntosh's First Brigade) was at Ashland Station on the Virginia Central Railroad. Their objective was to destroy two railroad bridges that crossed the North Anna River. One brigade fought the enemy while the other brigade had demolition duty. The fighting was fierce and part of the First Brigade was temporarily surrounded before fighting its way to safety. In this portion of the battle, losses for both sides were heavy. Colonel Adison W. Preston of the 1st Vermont Cavalry (Second Brigade) was killed. For the 5th New York, Major White was seriously wounded, could not be moved, and became a prisoner of war. Colonel Hammond was shot in the leg, but the bullet hit his saber scabbard—causing him injury but no bullet wound. The trauma to his leg would bother him for the rest of his life. Sergeant William Murray of Company A escaped injury when his horse was decapitated from enemy fire. Casualties for the 5th New York at Ashland Station were 2 officers wounded and 3 captured, and 13 enlisted men wounded and 17 captured.

== Wilson-Kautz Raid ==
Wilson-Kautz Raid

On June 20, Grant decided to "cut the enemy's lines of communication south", and the Wilson-Kautz Raid was conducted to accomplish this goal. On June 22, Wilson's cavalry division (including the 5th New York Cavalry), reinforced by portions of a division commanded by General August Kautz, began the raid using lesser-traveled roads to move south and west. Wilson was instructed to "avoid the observation of the enemy", and targets included the rail line that ran from Petersburg to Lynchburg and the Richmond and Danville Railroad. By June 26, the Union force advanced as far south and west as a bridge on the Staunton River near Roanoke Station, but was unsuccessful in capturing the bridge and could not continue southward along the rail line. In the return trip, Wilson's force lost two battles and found his path back to Union lines blocked by Confederate troops. In a desperate attempt to return to safety, artillery was spiked, supply wagons burned, and ambulances were abandoned with wounded that would become prisoners. A Confederate infantry attack caused half of Wilson's First Brigade (5th New York and 2nd Ohio) and Kautz to become separated from Wilson. Kautz and the two regiments fled cross country toward Petersburg. Many men moved in small groups and on foot.

=== Post raid ===
After the Wilson-Kautz raid, some men did not reach the safety of Union lines until July 8. Hammond had been promoted to colonel on July 3. Describing the raid, he wrote "I never saw men and officers so completely worn out." He estimated that losses were 1,000 men, 2,000 horses, 14 artillery pieces, 27 wagons, 14 ambulances, and about 250 wounded that could not be moved and became prisoners. Better records later indicated that the failed 350-mile raid destroyed some railroad track but cost 1,445 casualties out of a force of 5,500 men. The 5th New York Cavalry had 92 enlisted men plus 2 officers captured in 7 skirmishes and battles. During that time, 4 enlisted men were killed and 7 wounded. The regiment rested and regrouped for several days in early July. Many men were sent to hospitals, and almost 100 men had no horse. The dismounted men were sent to a camp in the District of Columbia and eventually fought at Maryland Heights, Rockville, Toll Gate, Poolesville, Snicker's Ferry, and Kernstown. Beginning August 7, the main portion of the regiment fought in Sheridan's Shenandoah Valley Campaign.

== Sheridan ==
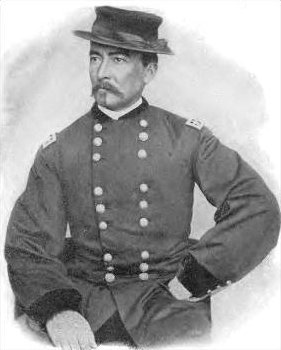
Gen. Sheridan

On August 12, Wilson's division (including the 5th New York Cavalry) was ordered to report to Sheridan in the Shenandoah Valley. They proceeded on the next day through Leesburg and Snicker's Gap and reached Sheridan's Army of the Shenandoah near Opequon Creek about 2 miles (3.2 km) from Winchester. They had travelled about 75 miles (121 km) in 22 hours. Although the regiment was in the Battle of Summit Point on August 21, it did not have multiple casualties until it had 5 killed and 14 wounded (including officers) in "furious fighting" at Kearneysville Station on August 25. Skirmishing for the next few weeks was at Berryville and Opequon Creek.

On August 30 Hammond relinquished command, and Lieutenant Colonel Bacon became commander of the regiment. Hammond was discharged on September 3 as he had completed his term of service. During his tenure, he had a bone in his right hand broken from a bullet and his right leg cracked above the ankle from a shot that hit his saber scabbard. Bacon commanded the regiment for only a short time, resigning effective September 12 (White was released from a Confederate prison on that day). This made Major Krom commander, and he would lead the regiment at Opequon. Although Major White was exchanged from Libby Prison on September 12 and promoted to lieutenant colonel on September 15, he did not take command of the regiment until he rejoined it in Winchester on December 19. Captain Boice was also promoted on September 15, becoming a major. In September and continuing until April 1865, Company K became the escort of General William H. Emory, commander of the XIX Corps.

=== Opequon ===
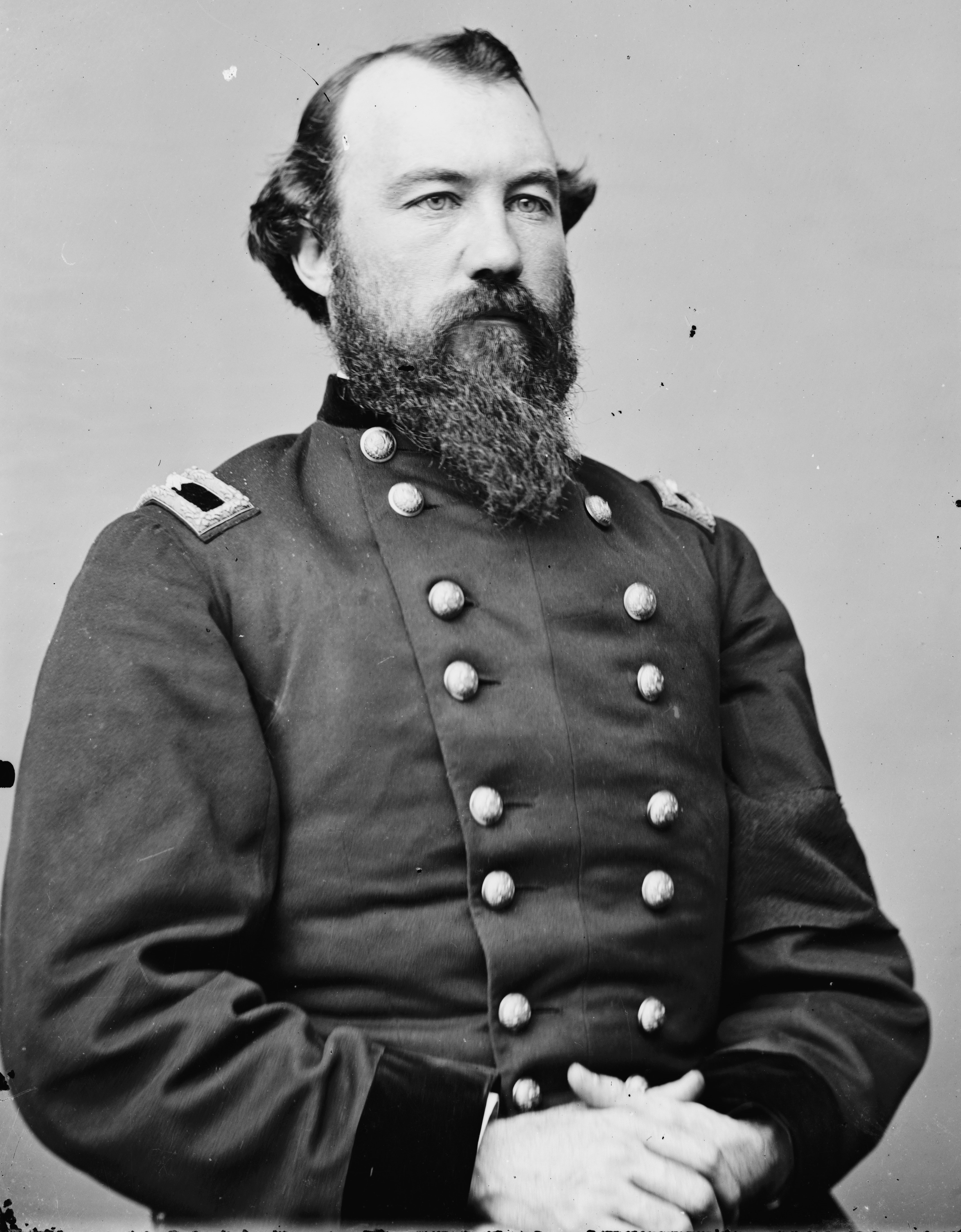
Gen. McIntosh

The Battle of Opequon, also known as the Third Battle of Winchester, is considered the most important American Civil War battle in the Shenandoah Valley. Over 54,000 men (both sides together) participated in this Union victory on September 19, and casualties for both sides totaled to over 8,600. Confederate forces had two generals killed and several others wounded such as Fitzhugh Lee. Union forces has one general killed and several others wounded. The commander of the entire Union Army in this battle was Major General Philip Sheridan, and his cavalry was led by Major General Alfred T. A. Torbert. Brigadier General James H. Wilson led Torbert's 3rd Division. Brigadier General John B. McIntosh led Wilson's First Brigade until he was seriously wounded, and then it was led by Lieutenant Colonel George A. Purington. Both the 5th New York and 2nd New York cavalries were part of the First Brigade. The 2nd New York, followed by the 5th New York, led the initial advance in this battle. The 5th New York Cavalry made five charges, including four against infantry. General McIntosh led a dismounted charge and was wounded—causing his left leg to be amputated below the knee. Company C's Captain Charles J. Farley also needed his leg amputated after receiving a wound while rallying his men. Casualties for the regiment were 2 officers and 11 enlisted men wounded, and 2 enlisted men killed and 2 captured. After the main fight, the regiment spent the next few days pursuing Confederates while having few casualties.

=== Battle of Tom's Brook ===
Gen. Custer

In early October, Wilson was replaced as division commander by General George Custer. The division retreated from the Dayton, Virginia, area—burning anything that could be used to help feed the Confederate Army. Enemy cavalry followed closely and harassed the rear guard. Sheridan grew tired and resentful of the aggressiveness of the enemy cavalry, and ordered Torbert to "whip the rebel cavalry or get whipped himself". Torbert used General Wesley Merritt's 1st Division to attack cavalry led by Lunsford L. Lomax and Custer's 3rd Division to attack Thomas L. Rosser. The attacks occurred on October 9 near Toms Brook. Custer led the 5th New York Cavalry in person in this highly successful attack. The Union victory was complete and caused a quick retreat by the Confederate forces—causing some to call this battle the "Woodstock Races". Headquarters wagons, supply wagons, ambulances, and 11 pieces of artillery were captured by the two Union divisions. Union casualties were around 50, while Confederate casualties were around 350.

=== Battle of Cedar Creek ===
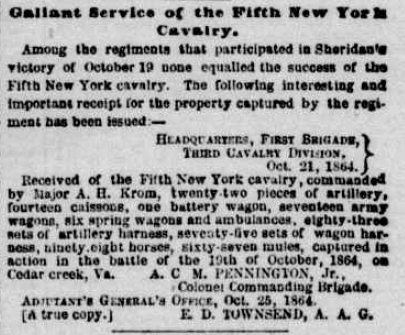
Cedar Creek

The Battle of Cedar Creek occurred on October 19 with over 47,000 participants. Early's Confederate army surprised Sheridan's army while Sheridan was away in Winchester. General George Crook's Union VIII Corps were surprised around 4:00 AM, and many of Crook's men were killed or captured while in their tents. General William H. Emory's XIX Corps was also driven back. Sheridan returned around 10:00 AM and rallied his army. Custer's 3rd Division attacked from Sheridan's right and prevented enemy cavalry from flanking the Union line. The First Brigade of Custer's 3rd Division was commanded by Colonel Alexander C. M. Pennington, and the 5th New York Cavalry (part of the First Brigade) was commanded by Major Krom. (Note: According to the Official Records, Major Boice is listed as commander of the 5th New York Cavalry in the Battle of Cedar Creek on October 19, 1864. Krom is listed as mustering out of the regiment on October 19, 1864, as his term expired. However, Krom continued to lead the regiment until October 21 when he relinquished command to Major Boice. An October 21 receipt from Colonel Pennington that was reproduced in a New York newspaper listed Major A. H. Krom as commander of the 5th New York Cavalry. Although Krom commanded the regiment at Cedar Creek and into October 21, Captain Elmer J. Barker was the official commander for October 19 to 21 (provided he was no longer under arrest for refusing to burn buildings earlier in October) according to the regimental historian.) The 5th New York performed well in this battle, capturing 22 artillery pieces, 14 caissons, 24 wagons and ambulances, 83 sets of artillery harnesses, 75 sets of wagon harnesses, 98 horses, and 67 mules. Two men from the regiment captured battle flags. Sergeant David H. Scofield (the regiment's quartermaster) captured the flag of the 13th Virginia Infantry and was awarded the Medal of Honor. Corporal John Walsh of Company D recaptured the flag of the 15th New Jersey Infantry that the Confederates had captured earlier in the day and was awarded the Medal of Honor.

The regiment spent the next month on reconnaissance and picket duty. Major Boice took command on October 20. The regiment became Sheridan's escort on December 1. On December 14 Sheridan was escorted to his new headquarters in Winchester. The regiment constructed its winter quarters. Boice was promoted to lieutenant colonel on January 27, 1865, replacing White who was promoted to colonel. Beginning February 27, Sheridan moved his army south along the Valley Pike.

=== Waynesboro ===
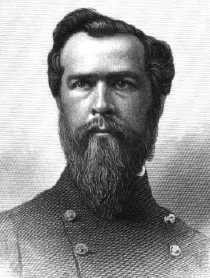
Lt. Col. Boice

On March 2, Sheridan's 1st and 3rd divisions destroyed Early's Confederate army near Waynesboro, Virginia, in the Battle of Waynesboro. Most of Early's army was killed or captured, although Early evaded capture. Custer's 3rd Division did the fighting, and a large number of Confederates surrendered. All of Early's headquarters equipment and artillery were captured.

After the battle, the regiment was part of a force that escorted about 1,400 prisoners 100 miles north to Winchester. A few men from the regiment (orderlies and messengers) remained with Sheridan, while the 5th New York was joined by several of the depleted regiments and dismounted men. The Union force totaled to about 1,200 from the 1st and 3rd Divisions. Lieutenant Colonel Boice commanded the men from the 3rd Division, since Colonel White was on furlough.

During the trip north, the 5th New York was the rear guard. On March 7, near Rude's Hill, the rear guard was attacked by Rosser's cavalry. (Note: Boudrye spells Rude's Hill as "Rood's Hill". A map at the Library of Congress uses the "Rude's Hill" spelling.) Boice led a counterattack that drove off the Confederates in hand-to-hand fighting. He fired everything in his revolver and "unhorsed six Rebel troopers" with the butt of his weapon. Bugler John Caitlin of Company A captured Rosser's chief bugler and kept his bugle as a souvenir of the war. Numerous Confederates were killed and 35 were captured. Sergeant Hiram S. Graves of the regiment's Company M was killed in action. The Union force and all prisoners arrived at Winchester on March 7. Here, they were under the command of General Hancock, who had temporary command of Union forces around Winchester.

== War's end ==
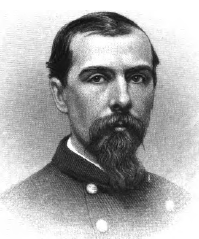
Col. White

The regiment had no more casualties after the March 7 fight at Rude's Hill. Sergeant Graves was the last member of the regiment to be killed in action. On March 13, the regiment went on a reconnaissance mission to Berryville. This was the last combat patrol for the majority of the regiment. On April 9, Robert E. Lee unconditionally surrendered his Army of Northern Virginia to Grant. The surrender look place at the home of Wilmer and Virginia McLean in the small community of Appomattox Court House, Virginia. The majority of the regiment was in Winchester at the time of Lee's surrender, although a small number of men were escorts for Sheridan and Custer at Appomattox. Private John McEwan of Company L was one of the escorts, and he accompanied General Lee to the house where the first interview with General Grant was conducted before the surrender. In early May, the regiment went from Staunton to Lexington and captured former Virginia Governor John Letcher.

The regiment spent most of June in Winchester. On July 18, Colonel White, commanding the regiment, notified the regiment that it would leave on the next day to New York City to muster out. July 19 is the official muster out date for the 5th New York Cavalry. However, the regiment camped on Hart's Island in New York beginning July 20. On July 25, the first two battalions of the regiment (plus Company I of the Third Battalion) received their pay and departed for home. The rest of the Third Battalion received its pay on the next day, and the 5th New York Cavalry ceased to exist.

During the war, the regiment lost 8 officers and 93 enlisted men killed or mortally wounded. Disease resulted in the death of 3 officers and 222 enlisted men. Over 500 enlisted men and 8 officers were captured. The regiment had more deaths at Confederate prisons, 99, than any other New York cavalry regiment. The Medal of Honor was awarded to six members of the regiment. (Note: Phisterer lists six members of the regiment as having been awarded the Medal of Honor, but only five were fighting with the regiment at the time of their actions. Private Julius Rhodes of Company F volunteered to fight with the 105th New York Volunteer Infantry after his horse was killed. His actions (he was also wounded) on August 30, 1862, while fighting with that infantry caused him to later be awarded the Medal of Honor. An 1895 source lists him as deserted in September 1862.) A New York historian wrote that the 5th New York Cavalry "fought at Hanover, Pa., the first battle on free soil; it was the first Union regiment that crossed the Rapidan in Grant's campaign; it received the first shock at the battle of the Wilderness, and was the last to leave the field."

== Affiliations, battle honors, detailed service, and casualties ==
=== Organizational affiliation ===
The 5th New York Volunteer Cavalry Regiment was organized at Augusta, ME and served with the following organizations:

- Dix's Command to March 1862
- Brig., Banks' V Corps, and Department of the Shenandoah (DoS), March and April 1862
- Hatch's Cavalry Brigade. Banks' V Corps, and DoS, to June 1862
- Cavalry Brigade, Sumner's II Corps, Army of Virginia, to September 1862
- Wyndham's Cavalry Brigade, Defenses of Washington, to February 1863
- Price's Independent Cavalry Brigade XXII Corps, Dept. of Washington, to April 1863
- 3rd Brigade, Stahel's Cavalry Division, XXII Corps, to June 28, 1863
- 1st Brigade, 3rd Division, Cavalry Corps, Army of the Potomac, and Army of the Shenandoah (AoS), Middle Military Division, to March 1865
- Cavalry, AoS, to July 1865

=== List of battles ===
The official list of battles in which the regiment bore a part:

- Battle of Front Royal (2 co.)
- First Battle of Winchester
- First Battle of Rappahannock Station
- Second Battle of Bull Run
- Battle of Hanover
- Battle of Gettysburg
- Battle of Williamsport
- Battle of Mine Run
- Battle of the Wilderness
- Battle of Spotsylvania Court House
- Battle of Cold Harbor
- Battle of Sappony Church
- First Battle of Ream's Station
- Third Battle of Winchester,
- Battle of Tom's Brook
- Battle of Cedar Creek
- Battle of Waynesboro, Virginia
- Battle of Five Forks
- Battle of Appomattox Station
- Battle of Appomattox Court House

=== Detailed service ===
The following is a detailed service of locations and operations:

==== 1861 ====
- Duty at Camp Harris, Baltimore, MD, November 18, 1861, to March 31, 1862

==== 1862 ====
- Ordered to join Banks in the field March 31
- South Fork, Shenandoah River, April 19
- New Market April 29
- Port Republic May 2
- Conrad's Store May 2 and 6
- Report to Gen. Hatch May 3
- Rockingham Furnace May 4
- Near Harrisonburg May 6
- New Market May 7
- Columbia River Bridge May 8
- Bowling Green Road near Fredericksburg May 11
- Operations in the Shenandoah Valley May 15-June 17
- Woodstock May 18
- Front Royal May 23 (Cos. "B" and "D")
- Strasburg, Middletown and Newtown May 24
- Winchester May 25
- Defense of Harper's Ferry May 28–30 (4 Cos.)
- Reconnaissance to New Market June 15
- Near Culpeper Court House July 12
- Liberty Mills July 17
- Near Orange Court House August 2
- Cedar Mountain August 9–10
- Pope's Campaign in Northern Virginia August 16-September 2
- Louisa Court House August 17
- Kelly's Ford August 20
- Warrenton Springs August 23–24
- Waterloo Bridge August 24
- Centreville August 28
- Groveton August 29
- Lewis Ford and Bull Run August 30
- Chantilly September 1
- Antietam, September 17–19
- Ashby's Gap September 22
- Leesburg October 16
- Upperville October 17
- Thoroughfare Gap and Haymarket October 18
- New Baltimore November 5
- Cedar Hill November 5
- Hopewell Gap November 8
- Thoroughfare Gap November 11
- Middleburg November 12
- Upperville November 16
- Aldie November 29
- Snicker's Gap and Berryville November 30
- Aldie December 18
- Cub Run December 31

==== 1863 ====
- Frying Pan January 5, 1863
- Cub Run January 5
- Middleburg January 26
- New Baltimore February 9
- Warrenton February 10
- Aldie March 4
- Fairfax Court House March 9
- Little River Turnpike and Chantilly March 23
- Broad Run April I
- White Plains April 28
- Warrenton Junction May 3
- Flemming and Shannon Cross Roads May 4
- Near Fairfax Court House May 8
- Marsteller's Place May 14
- Greenwich May 30
- Snicker's Gap June 1
- Middleburg June 10. Warrenton June 19
- Hanover, PA, June 30
- Hunterstown July 2
- Gettysburg, July 3
- Monterey Pass July 4
- Smithsburg July 5
- Hagerstown and Williamsport July 6
- Boonsboro July 8
- Hagerstown July 11–13
- Falling Waters July 14
- Hagerstown July 15
- Ashby's Gap July 26
- Expedition to Port Conway September 1–3
- Lamb's Creek September 1
- Advance from the Rappahannock to the Rapidan September 13–17
- Culpeper Court House September 13
- Rapidan Station September 13–14
- Somerville Ford September 14
- Raccoon Ford September 14–16
- Kelly's Ford September 18
- Madison Court House September 21
- Reconnaissance across the Rapidan September 21–23
- White's Ford September 21–22
- Brookin's Ford September 22
- Hazel River Bridge September 25
- Creigerville October 8
- Bristoe Campaign October 9–22
- Russell's Ford, James City and Bethesda Church October 10
- Sperryville Pike, Brandy Station and near Culpeper October II
- Gainesville October 14
- New Market October 16
- Groveton October 17–18
- Haymarket, Gainesville and Buckland s Mills October 19
- Advance to line of the Rappahannock November 7–8
- Stevensburg November 8
- Germania Ford November 18
- Mine Run Campaign November 26-December 2
- Morton's Ford November 26
- Raccoon Ford November 26–27

==== 1864 ====
- Ely's Ford January 19 and 22, 1864
- Demonstration on the Rapidan February 6–7
- Kilpatrick's Raid to Richmond February 28-March 4
- Ely's Ford February 28
- Beaver Dam Station and South Anna Bridge February 29
- Defenses of Richmond March 1
- Hanovertown March 2
- Aylett's and Stevensville March 2
- King's and Queen's Court House March 3
- Ely's Ford March 4
- Field's Ford March 8
- Southard's Cross Roads March 11
- Rapidan Campaign May–June
- Parker's Store May 5
- Todd's Tavern May 5–6
- Wilderness May 6–7
- Germania Ford, Brock Road and the Furnaces May 7
- Todd's Tavern May 7–8
- Spottsylvania May 8–18
- Downer's Bridge and Milford Station May 20
- Mattapony River and Bowling Green May 21
- North Anna River May 24
- Mt. Carmel Church May 25
- On line of the Pamunkey May 26–28
- Totopotomoy May 28–31
- Hanover Court House May 29
- Mechump's Creek May 30
- Signal Hill May 31
- Ashland Station June 1
- Cold Harbor June 1–12
- Gaines' Mill, Totopotomoy and Salem Church June 2
- Haw's Shop June 3
- Old Church June 10
- Shady Grove and Bethesda Church June 11
- Riddell's Shop and Long Bridge June 12
- White Oak Swamp June 13
- Malvern Hill June 14
- Smith's Store near St. Mary's Church June 15
- White House Landing June 19
- Wilson's Raid on South Side & Danville Railroad, June 22–30
- Black and white and Nottaway Court House June 23
- Staunton Bridge June 24
- Roanoke Bridge June 25
- Sappony Church or Stony Creek June 28
- Ream's Station June 29
- Before Petersburg till July 30 (A detachment of Regiment left at Dismounted Camp, participated in actions at Maryland Heights July 6–7; Rockville, MD, July 10; Toll Gate July 12; Poolesville July 15; Snicker's Ferry July 18; and Kernstown July 24)
- Sheridan's Shenandoah Valley Campaign August 7-November 28
- Winchester and Halltown August 17
- Opequan August 19
- Summit Point August 21
- Charlestown August 22
- Duffleld Station August 23
- Near Kearneysville August 25
- Berryville September 2–4
- Dumeld Station September 3
- Darkesville September 3
- Opequan September 7-13-15 and 17
- Abraham's Creek near Winchester September 13
- Battle of Winchester September 19
- Near Cedarville and Crooked Run September 20
- Front Royal Pike and Fisher's Hill September 21
- Milford September 22
- New Market September 23–24
- Mt. Crawford September 24
- Waynesboro September 26
- Port Republic September 26–27
- Mt. Meridian September 27
- Waynesboro and Railroad Bridge September 29
- Bridgewater October 2
- Brock's Gap October 6
- Forestville October 7
- Near Columbia Furnace October 7
- Tom's Brook, "Woodstock Races," October 8–9
- Back Road Cedar Creek October 13
- Lebanon Church October 14
- Cedar Run October 18
- Battle of Cedar Creek October 19
- Newtown and Ninevah November 12
- Mt. Jackson November 22
- Expedition to Lacy Springs December 19–22
- Lacy Springs December 21

==== 1865 ====
- Woodstock January 10, 1865
- Edenburg January 22
- Sheridan's Raid February 27-March 3
- Waynesboro March 2
- Capture of Gen. Early's Command (Detached from Division to guard prisoners from Waynesboro to Winchester. Mt. Sidney and Lacy Springs March 5)
- New Market March 6
- Rood's Hill March 7 (A portion of Regiment at Dinwiddie Court House March 30–31; Five Forks April 1; Fall of Petersburg April 2; Sweet House Creek April 3; Harper's Farm April 6; Appomattox Station April 8; Appomattox Court House April 9; Surrender of Lee and his army.)
- Regiment on duty at Headquarters Middle Military Division and in vicinity of Winchester till July
- Mustered out July 19, 1865, and honorably discharged from service.

=== Casualties ===
This Regiment lost greatest number killed in action of any Cavalry Regiment in the entire army: eight Officers and 93 Enlisted men killed and mortally wounded; three Officers and 222 Enlisted men died of disease, a total of 326.

== Notable members ==
- Sergeant Thomas Burke, Company A – Awarded Medal of Honor for capture of a battle flag at Hanover, PA., June 30, 1863.
- Col. John Hammond - Businessman from Crown Point, raised Company H, rose to command regiment, and later served as Republican Congressman for the 18th district from 1879 to 1883.
- Saddler-Sergeant Loron F. Packard, Company E – Awarded Medal of Honor for distinguished gallantry in a reconnaissance at Raccoon Ford, VA, November 27, 1863.
- Bugler Julius D. Rhodes, Company F – Awarded Medal of Honor for distinguished gallantry in action at Thoroughfare Gap and Bull Run, VA, August 28–30, 1862, respectively.
- Regimental Quartermaster-Sergeant, David H. Scofield – Awarded Medal of Honor for the capture of a flag at Cedar Creek, VA, October 19, 1864.
- Quartermaster-Sergeant John Tribe, Company G – Awarded Medal of Honor for most distinguished gallantry in action at Waterloo bridge, VA, August 25, 1862.
- Corporal John Walsh, Company D – Awarded Medal of Honor for the capture of a flag at Cedar Creek, VA, October 19, 1864.

== Armament/Equipment/Uniform ==
=== Armament ===
Troopers in the 5th New York were initially armed with a mix of Model 1840 Cavalry Saber Model 1860 Light Cavalry Saber, and one Colt .44 "Army" pistol or Colt .36 "Navy" pistols. Initially, a few of the breech-loading Sharps Carbines were issued and spread through the companies. Due to the shortage of carbines as well as the lengthy and difficult process of reloading the pistols, many troopers in the regiment privately purchased a second pistol in the same caliber as their issued weapon. Many men also purchased domestic and imported carbines such as Burnside, Merrill, Sharps, and Smith carbines.

After spending the first year with two issued pistols of different calibers (Navy .36 cal and Army .44 cal), by the first quarter of 1863, the regiment's pistols standardised at .44 caliber. As more Sharps carbines were produced, they were issued as standard armament so that the regiment was completely armed with them by the Gettysburg campaign. Also during the first half of 1863, the men were issued some Remington Model 1858 and Starr revolvers which fired the same ammunition as their Army caliber Colts, that being .44 Cal.

Atypical for a lot of the AoP's cavalry, the 5th New York, like some Michigan regiments, were issued the 30 inches (76 cm)-barreled Spencer repeating rifles alongside the 22 inches (56 cm)-barreled Spencer carbines during the summer of 1863. As these rifles and later the carbines became available, troopers began turning in their Sharps carbines for new Spencers.

==== Quarterly Ordnance surveys ====
The regiment reported the following issued weapons on quarterly ordnance surveys:

4th Quarter 1862

- A — 30 Colt Army Model 1848 & 1860, (.44 Cal.); 30 Model 1860 Light Cavalry Saber
- C — 15 Sharps Carbines, (.52 Cal.); 35 Colt Army Model 1848 & 1860, (.44 Cal.); 35 Model 1860 Light Cavalry Saber
- D — 24 Sharps Carbines, (.52 Cal.); 71 Colt Navy Model 1861, (.36 Cal.)
- I — 43 Colt Navy Model 1861, (.36 Cal.); 42 Model 1860 Light Cavalry Saber
- M — 24 Colt Navy Model 1861, (.36 Cal.); 19 Model 1860 Light Cavalry Saber
- Companies B, E, F, G, H, K, and L missing quarterly ordnance reports

1st Quarter 1863

- A — 7 Sharps Carbines, (.52 Cal.); 29 Colt Army Model 1848 & 1860, (.44 Cal.); 26 Model 1860 Light Cavalry Saber
- E — 18 Sharps Carbines, (.52 Cal.); 28 Colt Army Model 1848 & 1860, (.44 Cal.); 39 Model 1840 Cavalry Saber
- G — 12 Sharps Carbines, (.52 Cal.); 36 Colt Army Model 1848 & 1860, (.44 Cal.); 37 Model 1860 Light Cavalry Saber
- M — 7 Sharps Carbines, (.52 Cal.); 20 Colt Army Model 1848 & 1860, (.44 Cal.); 19 Model 1860 Light Cavalry Saber
- Companies B, C, D, F, H, I, K, and L missing quarterly ordnance reports

2nd Quarter 1863

- A — 30 Colt Army Model 1848 & 1860, (.44 Cal.); 24 Model 1860 Light Cavalry Saber
- C — 9 Sharps Carbines, (.52 Cal.); 19 Colt Army Model 1848 & 1860, (.44 Cal.); 23 Model 1860 Light Cavalry Saber
- E — 18 Sharps Carbines, (.52 Cal.); 21 Colt Army Model 1848 & 1860, (.44 Cal.); 32 Model 1840 Cavalry Saber
- G — 12 Sharps Carbines, (.52 Cal.); 36 Colt Army Model 1848 & 1860, (.44 Cal.); 37 Model 1840 Cavalry Saber
- Companies B, E, F, H, I, K, L, and M missing quarterly ordnance reports

3rd Quarter 1863

- A — 21 Spencer Rifles (.52 Cal.); 31 Colt Army Model 1848 & 1860, (.44 Cal.); 5 Remington Model 1858, (.44 Cal.); 32 Model 1860 Light Cavalry Saber
- B — 19 Spencer Rifles (.52 Cal.); 17 Colt Army Model 1848 & 1860, (.44 Cal.); 18 Model 1860 Light Cavalry Saber
- C — 13 Spencer Rifles (.52 Cal.); 7 Sharps Carbines, (.52 Cal.); 21 Colt Army Model 1848 & 1860, (.44 Cal.); 23 Model 1860 Light Cavalry Saber
- D — 20 Spencer Rifles (.52 Cal.); 7 Sharps Carbines, (.52 Cal.); 53 Colt Army Model 1848 & 1860, (.44 Cal.); 51 Model 1860 Light Cavalry Saber
- E — 18 Sharps Carbines, (.52 Cal.); 21 Colt Army Model 1848 & 1860, (.44 Cal.); 39 Model 1840 Cavalry Saber
- F — 32 Spencer Rifles (.52 Cal.); 68 Colt Army Model 1848 & 1860, (.44 Cal.); 49 Model 1860 Light Cavalry Saber
- G — 17 Spencer Rifles (.52 Cal.); 8 Colt Army Model 1848 & 1860, (.44 Cal.); 8 Model 1840 Cavalry Saber
- H — 30 Spencer Rifles (.52 Cal.); 39 Colt Army Model 1848 & 1860, (.44 Cal.); 2 Remington Model 1858, (.44 Cal.); 12 Model 1840 Cavalry Saber; 16 Model 1860 Light Cavalry Saber
- K — 21 Spencer Rifles (.52 Cal.); 23 Colt Army Model 1848 & 1860, (.44 Cal.); 18 Model 1860 Light Cavalry Saber
- L — 21 Spencer Rifles (.52 Cal.); 26 Colt Army Model 1848 & 1860, (.44 Cal.); 10 Model 1860 Light Cavalry Saber
- Companies E, I, and M missing quarterly ordnance reports

4th Quarter 1863

- A — 5 Spencer Rifles (.52 Cal.); 1 Spencer Carbine (.52 Cal.); 14 Colt Army Model 1848 & 1860, (.44 Cal.); 5 Remington Model 1858, (.44 Cal.); 24 Model 1860 Light Cavalry Saber
- B — 9 Spencer Rifles (.52 Cal.); 1 Spencer Carbine (.52 Cal.); 13 Colt Army Model 1848 & 1860, (.44 Cal.); 16 Model 1860 Light Cavalry Saber
- C — 14 Spencer Rifles (.52 Cal.); 7 Sharps Carbines, (.52 Cal.); 21 Colt Army Model 1848 & 1860, (.44 Cal.); 24 Model 1860 Light Cavalry Saber
- D — 11 Spencer Rifles (.52 Cal.); 7 Sharps Carbines, (.52 Cal.); 30 Colt Army Model 1848 & 1860, (.44 Cal.); 27 Model 1860 Light Cavalry Saber
- F — 22 Spencer Rifles (.52 Cal.); 42 Colt Army Model 1848 & 1860, (.44 Cal.); 25 Model 1840 Cavalry Saber
- G — 18 Spencer Rifles (.52 Cal.); 25 Colt Army Model 1848 & 1860, (.44 Cal.); 16 Model 1860 Light Cavalry Saber
- H — 24 Spencer Rifles (.52 Cal.); 37 Colt Army Model 1848 & 1860, (.44 Cal.); 2 Remington Model 1858, (.44 Cal.); 12 Model 1840 Cavalry Saber; 21 Model 1860 Light Cavalry Saber
- K — 21 Spencer Rifles (.52 Cal.); 1 Spencer Carbine (.52 Cal.); 24 Colt Army Model 1848 & 1860, (.44 Cal.); 10 Model 1860 Light Cavalry Saber
- L — 17 Spencer Rifles (.52 Cal.); 25 Colt Army Model 1848 & 1860, (.44 Cal.); 10 Model 1840 Cavalry Saber
- L — 17 Spencer Rifles (.52 Cal.); 21 Colt Army Model 1848 & 1860, (.44 Cal.); 13 Model 1860 Light Cavalry Saber
- Companies E and I missing quarterly ordnance reports

2nd Quarter 1864

- B — 30 Spencer Carbines, (.52 Cal.); 19 Colt Army Model 1848 & 1860, (.44 Cal.); 19 Model 1860 Light Cavalry Saber
- C — 7 Sharps Carbines, (.52 Cal.); 33 Colt Army Model 1848 & 1860, (.44 Cal.); 51 Model 1860 Light Cavalry Saber
- D — 6 Spencer Rifles (.52 Cal.); 21 Spencer Carbines (.52 Cal.); 19 Colt Army Model 1848 & 1860, (.44 Cal.); 1 Remington Model 1858, (.44 Cal.); 32 Model 1860 Light Cavalry Saber
- F — 5 Spencer Rifles (.52 Cal.); 12 Spencer Carbines (.52 Cal.); 13 Colt Army Model 1848 & 1860, (.44 Cal.); 17 Model 1860 Light Cavalry Saber
- H — 2 Spencer Rifles (.52 Cal.); 13 Spencer Carbines (.52 Cal.); 10 Colt Army Model 1848 & 1860, (.44 Cal.); 2 Remington Model 1858, (.44 Cal.); 4 Starr Army Model 1863, (.44 Cal.); 5 Model 1860 Light Cavalry Saber
- I — 23 Spencer Carbines, (.52 Cal.); 23 Colt Army Model 1848 & 1860, (.44 Cal.); 1 Remington Model 1858, (.44 Cal.); 28 Model 1860 Light Cavalry Saber
- L — 34 Spencer Carbines, (.52 Cal.); 13 Colt Army Model 1848 & 1860, (.44 Cal.); 10 Remington Model 1858, (.44 Cal.); 27 Model 1860 Light Cavalry Saber
- M — 9 Spencer Rifles (.52 Cal.); 19 Spencer Carbines (.52 Cal.); 14 Colt Army Model 1848 & 1860, (.44 Cal.); 4 Remington Model 1858, (.44 Cal.); 15 Model 1860 Light Cavalry Saber
- Companies A, E, G, and K missing quarterly ordnance reports

3rd Quarter 1864

- B — 30 Spencer Carbines, (.52 Cal.); 22 Colt Army Model 1848 & 1860, (.44 Cal.); 26 Model 1860 Light Cavalry Saber
- C — 28 Spencer Carbines, (.52 Cal.); 28 Colt Army Model 1848 & 1860, (.44 Cal.); 28 Model 1860 Light Cavalry Saber
- D — 5 Spencer Rifles (.52 Cal.); 25 Spencer Carbines (.52 Cal.); 23 Colt Army Model 1848 & 1860, (.44 Cal.); 10 Remington Model 1858, (.44 Cal.); 53 Model 1860 Light Cavalry Saber
- F — 4 Spencer Rifles (.52 Cal.); 10 Spencer Carbines (.52 Cal.); 12 Colt Army Model 1848 & 1860, (.44 Cal.); 5 Remington Model 1858, (.44 Cal.); 18 Model 1860 Light Cavalry Saber
- H — 2 Burnside Carbines, (.54 Cal.); 26 Spencer Carbines (.52 Cal.); 1 Sharps Carbine, (.52 Cal.); 110 Colt Army Model 1848 & 1860, (.44 Cal.); 5 Remington Model 1858, (.44 Cal.); 2 Starr Army Model 1863, (.44 Cal.); 31 Model 1860 Light Cavalry Saber
- I — 27 Spencer Carbines, (.52 Cal.); 35 Colt Army Model 1848 & 1860, (.44 Cal.); 28 Model 1860 Light Cavalry Saber
- K — 21 Spencer Carbines, (.52 Cal.); 25 Colt Army Model 1848 & 1860, (.44 Cal.); 27 Model 1860 Light Cavalry Saber
- L — 28 Spencer Carbines, (.52 Cal.); 15 Colt Army Model 1848 & 1860, (.44 Cal.); 10 Remington Model 1858, (.44 Cal.); 34 Model 1860 Light Cavalry Saber
- M — 5 Spencer Rifles (.52 Cal.); 23 Spencer Carbines (.52 Cal.); 10 Colt Army Model 1848 & 1860, (.44 Cal.); 20 Remington Model 1858, (.44 Cal.); 20 Model 1860 Light Cavalry Saber
- Companies A, E, and G missing quarterly ordnance reports

==== Sabers ====
Issued weapons

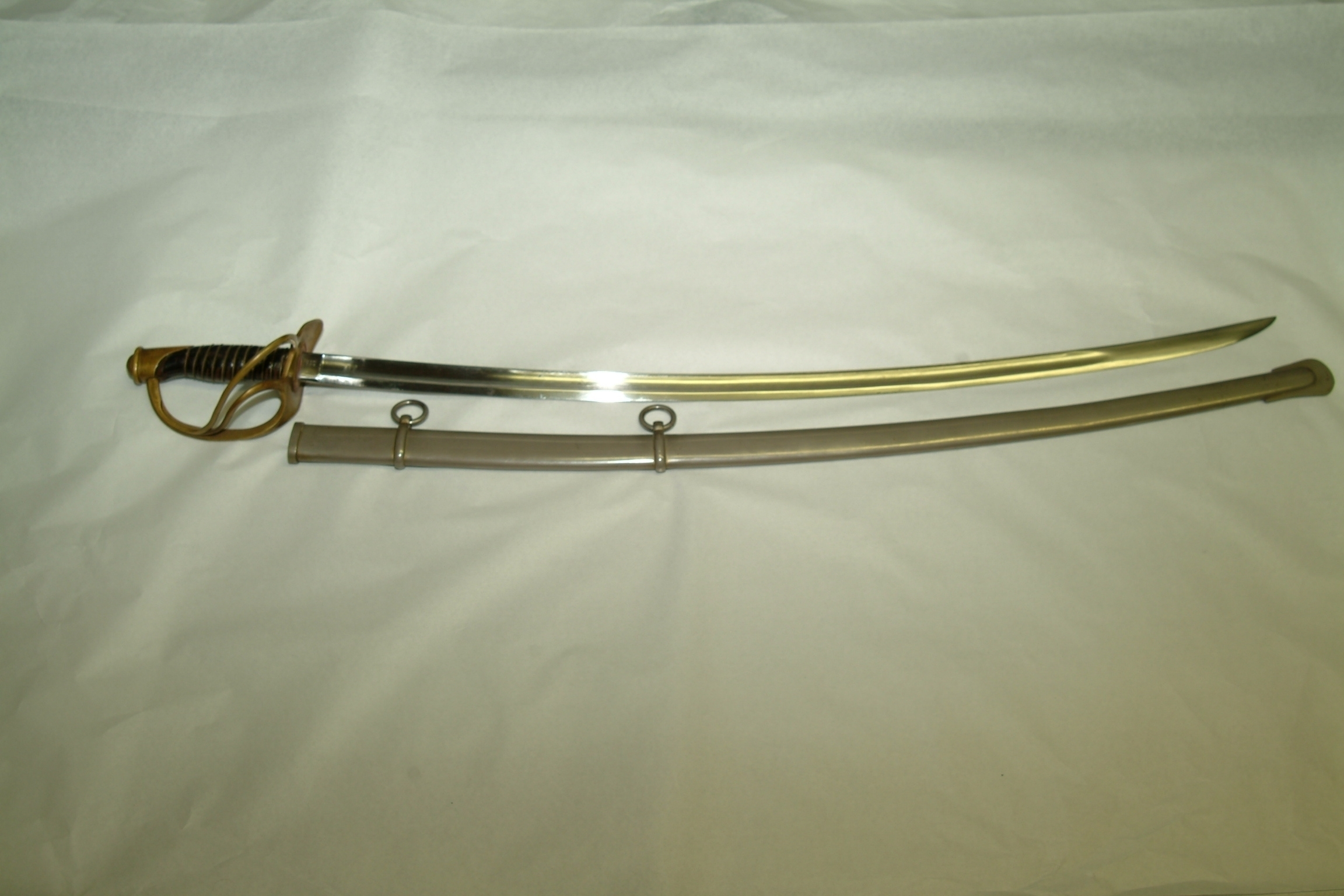
Model 1860 Light Cavalry Saber

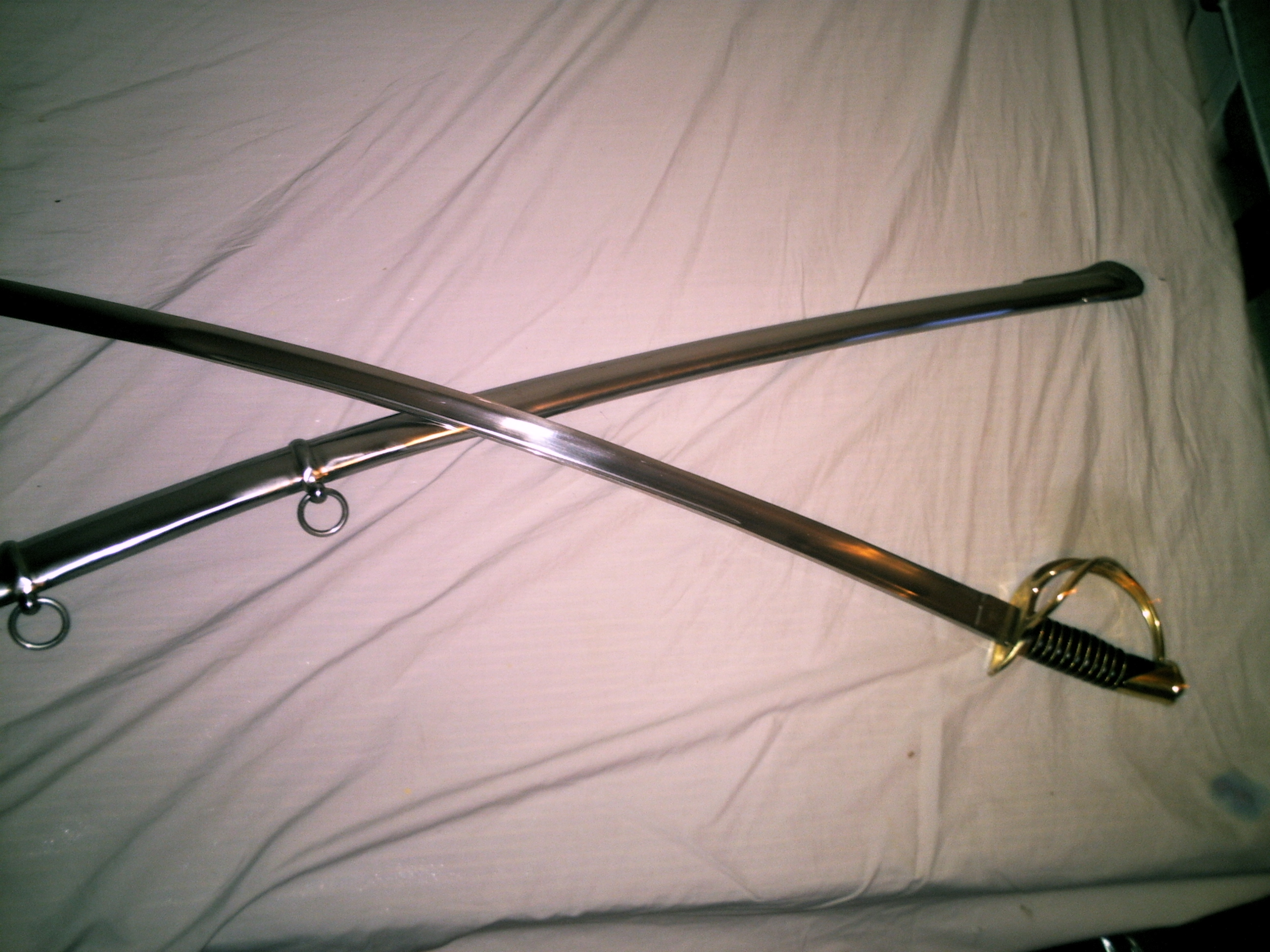
"Old Wristbreaker," Model 1840 Cavalry Saber

==== Pistols ====
Issued weapons

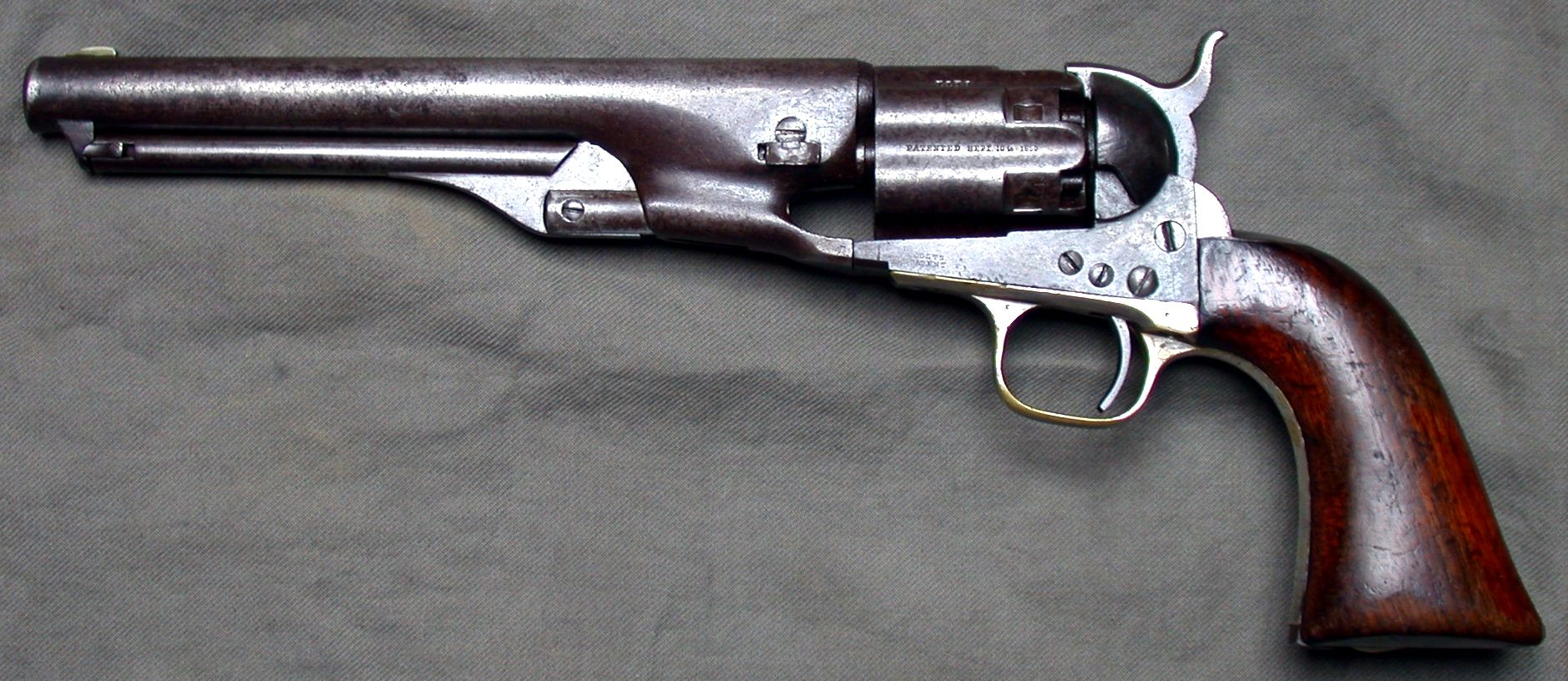
Colt Army 1860

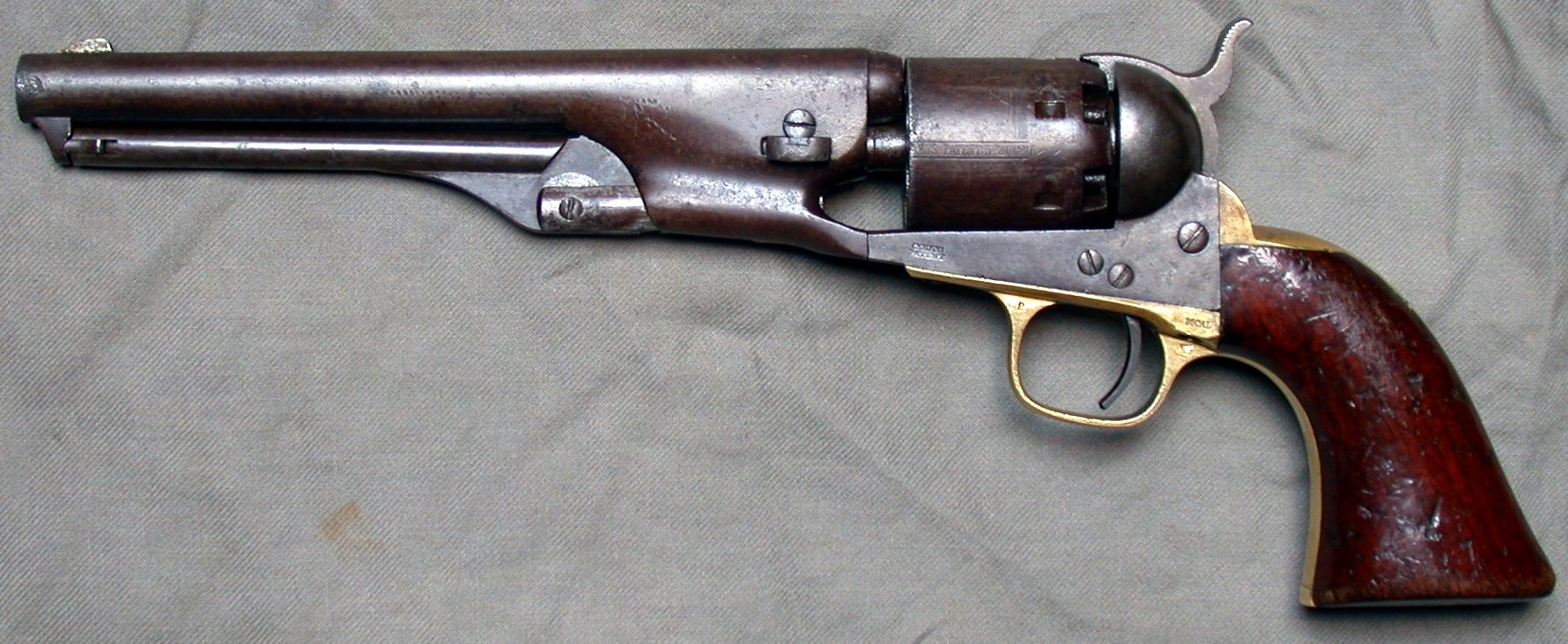
Colt Model 1861 Navy

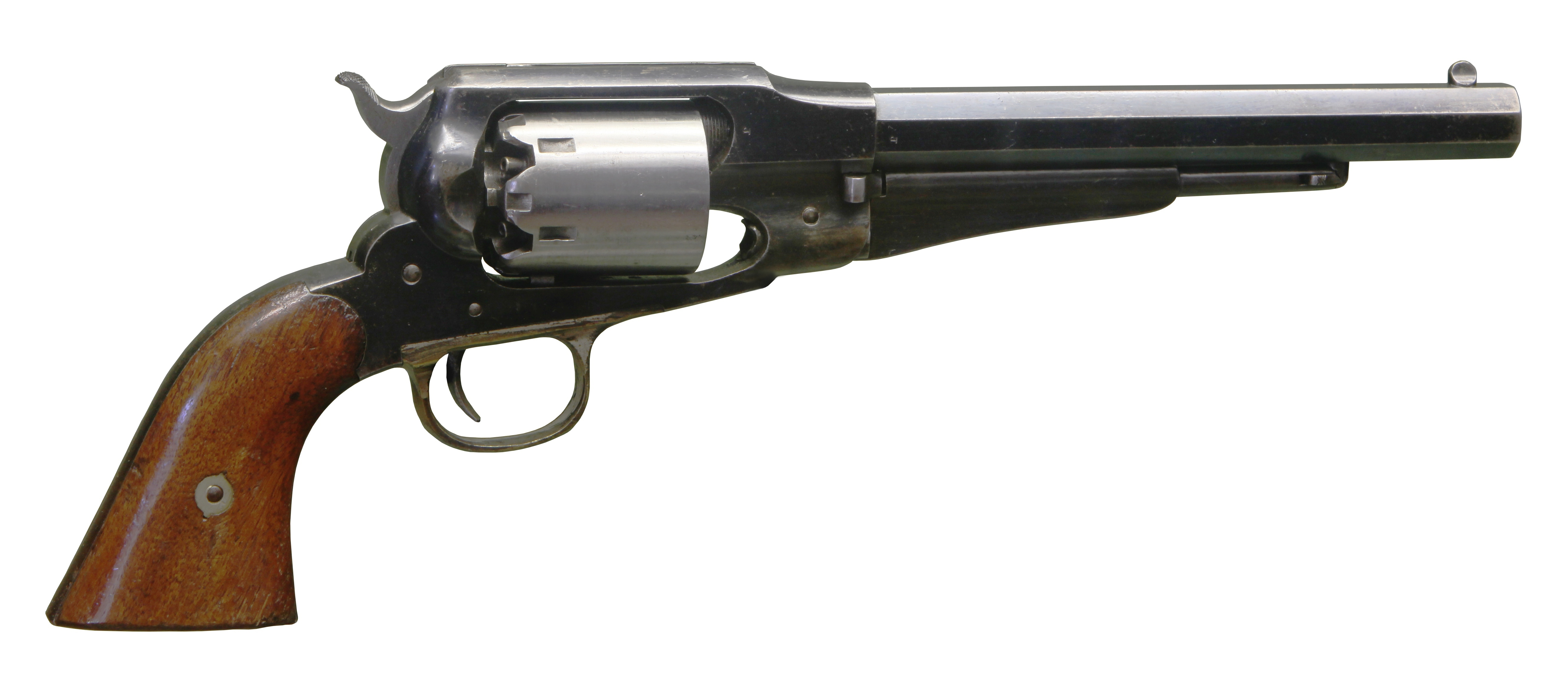
Remington New Model 1858 .44 "Army" pistol

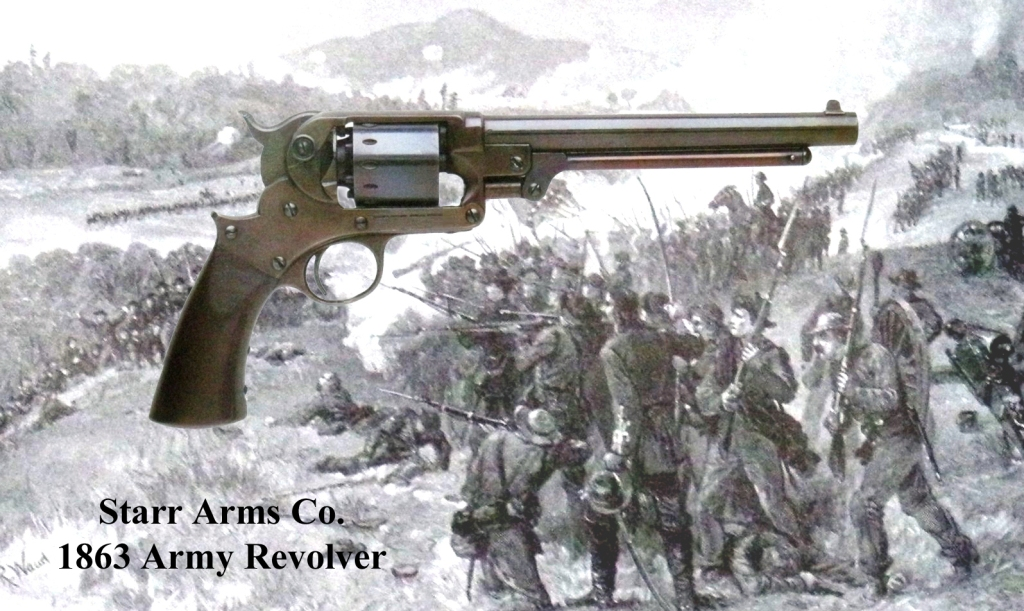
Starr M1863 .44 Single Action Revolver

==== Rifles/Carbines ====
Issued weapons

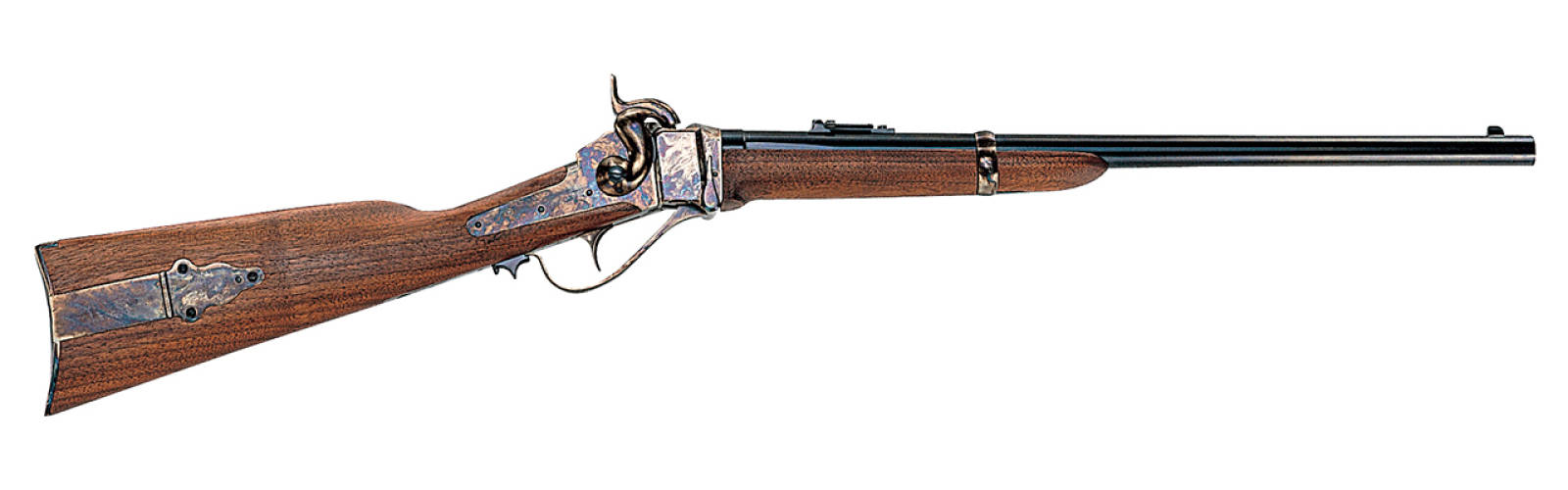
Sharps single-shot carbine

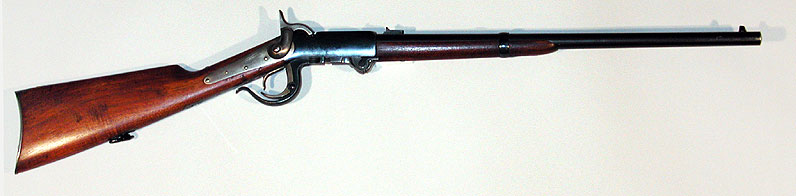
Burnside single-shot carbine

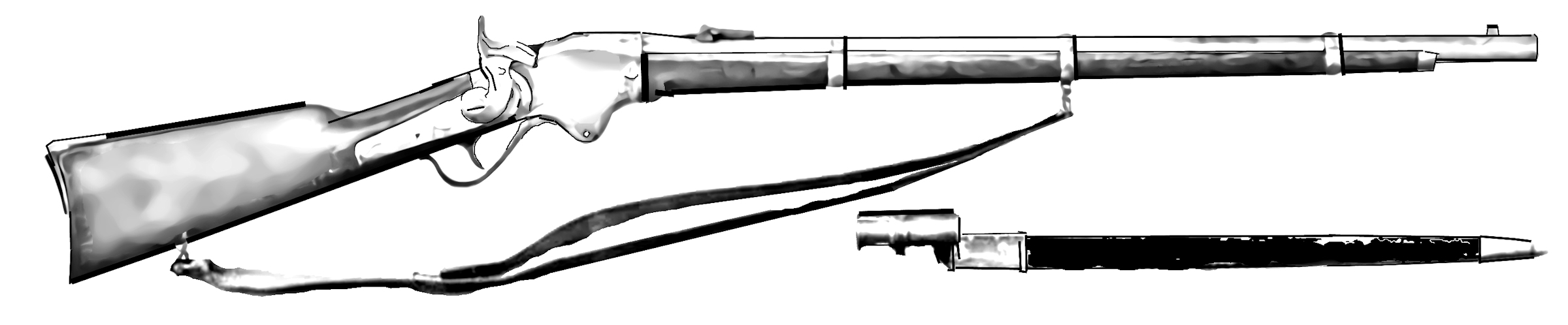
Spencer seven-shot rifle

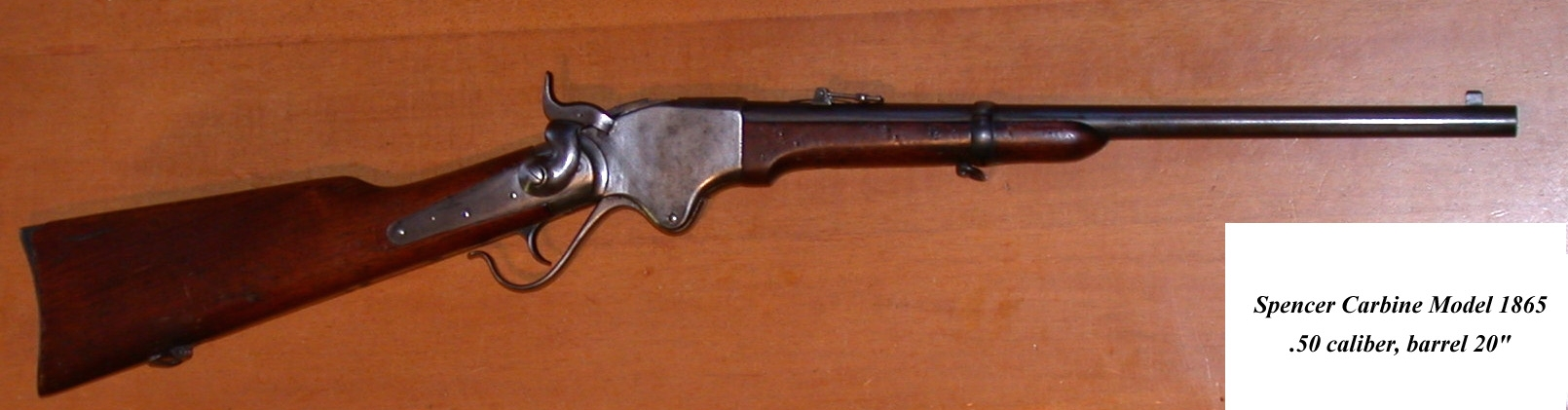
Spencer seven-shot carbine

=== Equipment and Tack ===
The 5th New York Cavalry used standard McClellan saddle and tack. Like many other volunteer cavalry regiments, the 5th New York obtained breast straps for all mounts while some troopers were issued crupper straps and martingales as well.

=== Uniform ===
The men of the regiment were issued their initial uniforms as they became available during training on Staten Island. They were issued dark blue Cavalry shell jackets, sky blue cavalry trousers (with reinforced seat), and the sky blue Cavalry winter overcoat (with a shorter cape than the infantry version. From photographs in the regimental history, the Hardee hat and slouch hat seemed to be more common than the kepi, or forage cap, among the regiment.

== See also ==
- List of New York Civil War units
- New York in the American Civil War
