= David Scofield =

David Scofield may refer to:

- David Paul Scofield (1922–2008), British actor
- David H. Scofield (1840–1905), American soldier
- David S. Scofield (1964 - present), Electronics Engineer
