= Julius D. Rhodes =

American Civil War Medal of Honor recipient (1841–1906)

Sergeant Major Julius Dexter Rhodes
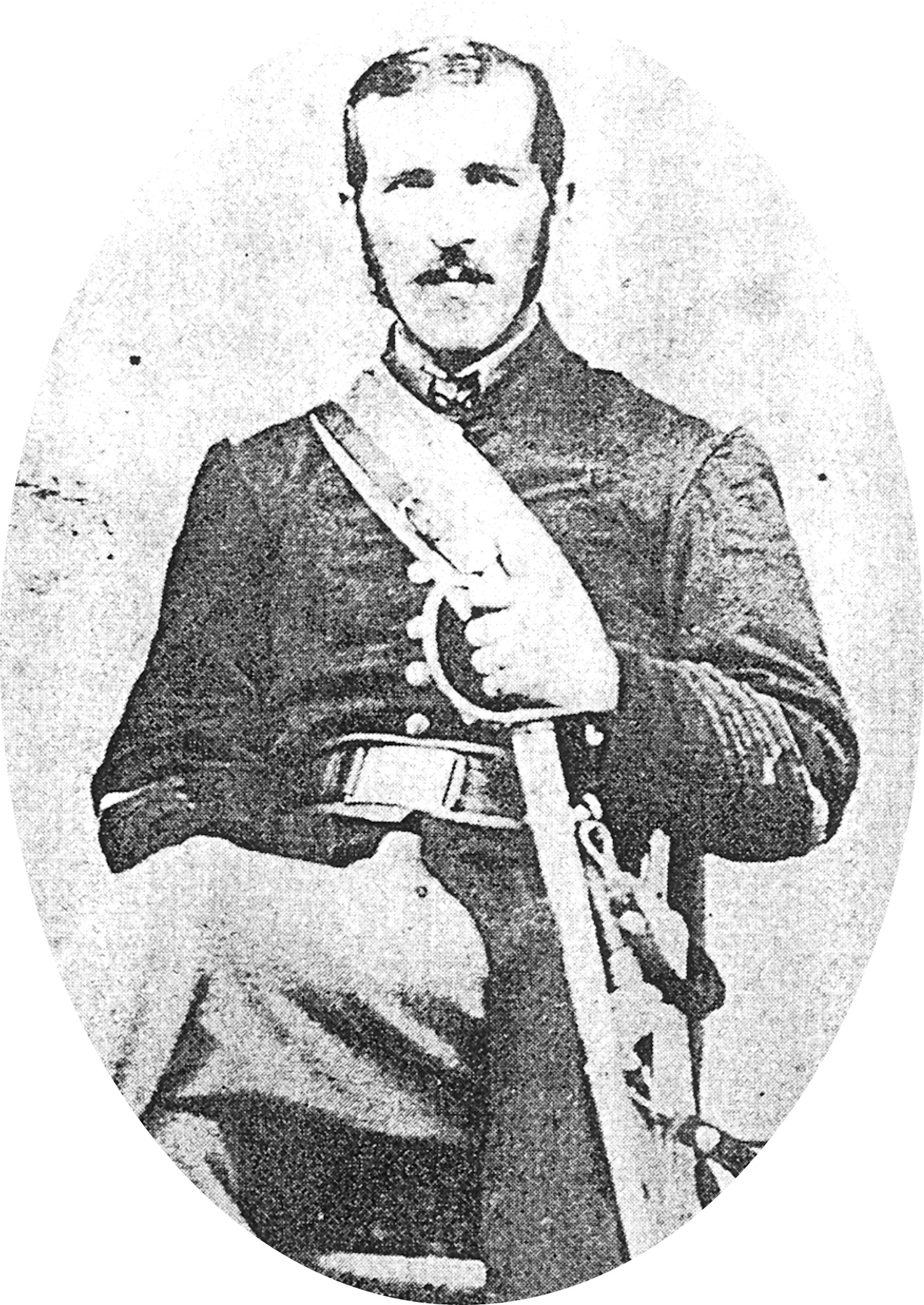
- Rhodes in 1865
- Born: 1 October 1841; Monroe, Michigan, US
- Died: 19 February 1906 (aged 64); Washington D.C., US
- Burial place: Greenwood Cemetery, Pleasantville, New Jersey, US
- Military career
- Allegiance: United States (Union)
- Branch: Army
- Service years: 1861-1865
- Rank: Sergeant Major
- Units: Company F, 5th New York Cavalry
- Conflicts: Battle of Throughfare Pass, Second Battle of Bull Run, Third Battle of Petersburg
- Awards: Medal of Honor

Julius Dexter Rhodes (1 October 1841 – 19 February 1906) was a sergeant major in the United States Army who was awarded the Medal of Honor for gallantry during the American Civil War. After having his horse shot from under him at the Battle of Throughfare Gap, he helped the 105th New York Volunteers advance on the enemy line. He was later wounded while fighting in the Second Battle of Bull Run. He was awarded the Medal of Honor on 9 March 1887.

== Personal life ==
Rhodes was born on 1 October 1841 in Monroe, Michigan, to parents Dexter B. Rhodes and Caroline N. Hall Rhodes. He was one of two children in the family.

== Military service ==
At the beginning of the American Civil War, Rhodes was a student at the Springville Institute in Erie County, New York. He enlisted on 3 September 1861 as a private and a bugler for Company F of the 5th New York Cavalry. In action near Harrisburg, Virginia, he erroneously sounded a call to advance when he had been ordered to sound a call for retreat. Although his erroneous call led to a Union victory, he still lost rank. In August 1862, he was the only survivor of a 10-man group sent to destroy the Waterloo Bridge (Note: This was the historically major route for moving agricultural goods from the Shenandoah Valley to the Fredericksburg.) Its destruction bought time for Pope's right wing, but Jackson still managed to flank his army by crossing upstream. bridge over the river leading to Rappahannock Station (present day Remington, VA) over the Rappahannock River between Culpeper and Fauquier Counties during the First Battle of Rappahannock Station, an action that forced Jackson to cross at Hinson's Ford 4 miles (6.4 km) fuirther upstream. They succeeded in destroying the bridge. Still a private, he received the Medal of Honor for two actions between 28 and 30 August 1862. First, at the Battle of Thoroughfare Gap, he survived getting his horse shot out from under him and voluntarily joined the 105th New York Infantry in advancing against the enemy lines. Second, he "demonstrated gallantry" at the Second Battle of Bull Run, where he was wounded. He was taken to Harewood Hospital in Washington, DC, and was soon discharged as disabled on 27 February 1863.

After recovering, he travelled to New Orleans to care for his younger brother Julian, who had served with the 116th New York Volunteers. While there, apparently bored with nursing, he enlisted in the 1st Louisiana Cavalry. (Note: The 1st Louisiana Cavalry was a cavalry unit in the Union Armyorganized in New Orleans in August 1862 by order of Maj. Gen. Benjamin Butler and recruited from among Unionist residents and refugees; it consisted primarily of foreigners and men of Northern birth. For, more information see its Wikipedia article here.) His brother later joined him. They served in the Lee's Cavalry Division, Franklin's XIX Corps during the failed Red River campaign. While with the 1st Louisiana Cavalry, he was mentioned in dispatches for his actions during the skirmishing around Donaldsonville.

Rhodes resigned from the 1st Louisiana his unit September 10, 1864 and traveled to Maine where, a month later, he joined Company M, 31st Maine Volunteers in Augusta as a Sergeant. Rhodes and his company joined the 31st Maine in the trenches at Petersburg. He again lost rank and was demoted to Corporal. On 2 April 1865, he saw his final action at the Third Battle of Petersburg in Virginia, where he was in the hand-to-hand combat at Fort Mahon and was pierced in the cheek with a bayonet, receiving a skull fracture and losing consciousness. He was hospitalized for the rest of the war.

His records suggest he was an eager, albeit reckless or undisciplined soldier, having volunteered with three different units, having been demoted twice, having distinguished himself on three separate occasion, and having been wounded in heavy combat twice.

Rhodes' Medal of Honor citation reads:

The President of the United States of America, in the name of Congress, takes pleasure in presenting the Medal of Honor to Private Julius Dexter Rhodes, United States Army, for extraordinary heroism on August 28 & 30, 1862, while serving with Company F, 5th New York Cavalry, in action at Thoroughfare Gap & Bull Run, Virginia. After having had his horse shot under him in the fight at Thoroughfare Gap, Virginia, Private Rhodes voluntarily joined the 105th New York Volunteers and was conspicuous in the advance on the enemy's lines. Displayed gallantry in the advance on the skirmish line at Bull Run, Virginia where he was wounded.

— W. C. Endicott, Secretary of War

== Post war ==
After he recovered from his wounds, Rhodes returned to New York. On January 25, 1868, the 27-year-old Rhodes married 17-year-old Ellen Marie Shaw (1851-1903) from Ellsworth, ME. He worked as an engineer and inventor. The couple had four children of which the last two, sons, survived to adulthood. They lived in Maine, Pennsylvania, Wisconsin, New Jersey, and Washington, DC.

The Medal of Honor was awarded to Rhodes for actions on August 28 and 30, 1862 on March 9, 1887. His wife predeceased him in 1903 and he died at 64 on January 19, 1906, in Washington, DC. He is buried in Greenwood Cemetery in Atlantic City, New Jersey.
