= Loron F. Packard =

American Union Army soldier

- Born: August 23, 1843; Cattaraugus County, New York, US
- Died: July 16, 1903 (aged 59); Cuba, New York, US
- Military career
- Allegiance: United States
- Branch: Union Army
- Rank: Saddler Sergeant
- Unit: Company E, 5th New York Cavalry
- Conflicts: American Civil War: Skirmish at Raccoon Ford
- Awards: Medal of Honor

Loron Franklin Packard (August 23, 1843 – July 16, 1903) was a Union Army soldier during the American Civil War. At 18-years-old, Packard enlisted in the 5th New York Cavalry Regiment on August 29, 1861, at Haskell Flats, New York as a Private and was sworn into federal service on August 31. He was assigned to Company E. He received the Medal of Honor for gallantry during a reconnaissance at Racoon Ford, Virginia on November 27, 1863 during the Mine Run Campaign. After a skirmish, he returned to successfully rescue a comrade who had been taken prisoner by the Confederates. He was eventually promoted to Saddler-Sergeant and mustered out on July 19, 1865, at Winchester, Virginia.

== Medal of Honor citation ==
The President of the United States of America, in the name of Congress, takes pleasure in presenting the Medal of Honor to Private Loron F. Packard, United States Army, for extraordinary heroism on 27 November 1863, while serving with Company E, 5th New York Cavalry, in action at Raccoon Ford, Virginia. After his command had retreated, Private Packard, voluntarily and alone, returned to the assistance of a comrade and rescued him from the hands of three armed Confederates.

== Post war ==
Packard returned to New York after the war. He married Francese O. Graves and had two daughters.

One of five 5th New York Cavalry troopers to be awarded the Medal of Honor for Civil War bravery, he received his medal on August 20, 1894.

== See also ==
- List of Medal of Honor recipients
- List of American Civil War Medal of Honor recipients: M-P
