= John Walsh (Medal of Honor) =

- Born: December 4, 1841; County Tipperary, Ireland
- Died: May 25, 1924 (aged 82); Massachusetts
- Burial place: Saint Benedicts Cemetery, Springfield, Massachusetts
- Military career
- Allegiance: United States
- Branch: United States Army; Union Army
- Rank: Corporal
- Unit: 5th New York Cavalry
- Conflicts: American Civil War • Battle of Cedar Creek
- Awards: Medal of Honor

John Walsh (December 4, 1841 – May 25, 1924) was an Irish-born Union Army soldier during the American Civil War. He received the Medal of Honor for gallantry during the Battle of Cedar Creek, fought near Middletown, Virginia on October 19, 1864. The battle was the decisive engagement of Major General Philip Sheridan's Valley Campaigns of 1864 and was the largest battle fought in the Shenandoah Valley.

== Medal of Honor citation ==
The President of the United States of America, in the name of Congress, takes pleasure in presenting the Medal of Honor to Corporal John Walsh, United States Army, for extraordinary heroism on 19 October 1864, while serving with Company D, 5th New York Cavalry, in action at Cedar Creek, Virginia. Corporal Walsh recaptured the flag of the 15th New Jersey Infantry.

== See also ==
- List of Medal of Honor recipients
- List of American Civil War Medal of Honor recipients: T-Z
