= David H. Scofield =

- Born: December 10, 1840; Mamaroneck, New York
- Died: September 30, 1905 (aged 64); Connecticut
- Burial place: Slawson Cemetery, Darien, Connecticut
- Military career
- Allegiance: United States
- Branch: United States Army; Union Army
- Service years: 1861 - 1865
- Rank: Quartermaster Sergeant
- Unit: 5th New York Cavalry
- Conflicts: American Civil War • Battle of Cedar Creek
- Awards: Medal of Honor

David H. Scofield (December 12, 1840 – September 30, 1905) was a Union Army soldier during the American Civil War. He received the Medal of Honor for gallantry during the Battle of Cedar Creek fought near Middletown, Virginia on October 19, 1864. The battle was the decisive engagement of Major General Philip Sheridan’s Valley Campaigns of 1864 and was the largest battle fought in the Shenandoah Valley.

Scofield enlisted in the Army from Stamford, Connecticut, in October 1861, and was assigned to the 5th New York Cavalry as a sergeant. He was promoted to regimental quartermaster sergeant in July 1864, and mustered out with his regiment in July 1865.

== Medal of Honor citation ==
"The President of the United States of America, in the name of Congress, takes pleasure in presenting the Medal of Honor to Quartermaster Sergeant David H. Scofield, United States Army, for extraordinary heroism on 19 October 1864, while serving with Company K, 5th New York Cavalry, in action at Cedar Creek, Virginia, for capture of flag of 13th Virginia Infantry (Confederate States of America)."

== See also ==
- List of Medal of Honor recipients
- List of American Civil War Medal of Honor recipients: Q-S
