= McClellan saddle =

US Cavalry saddle style

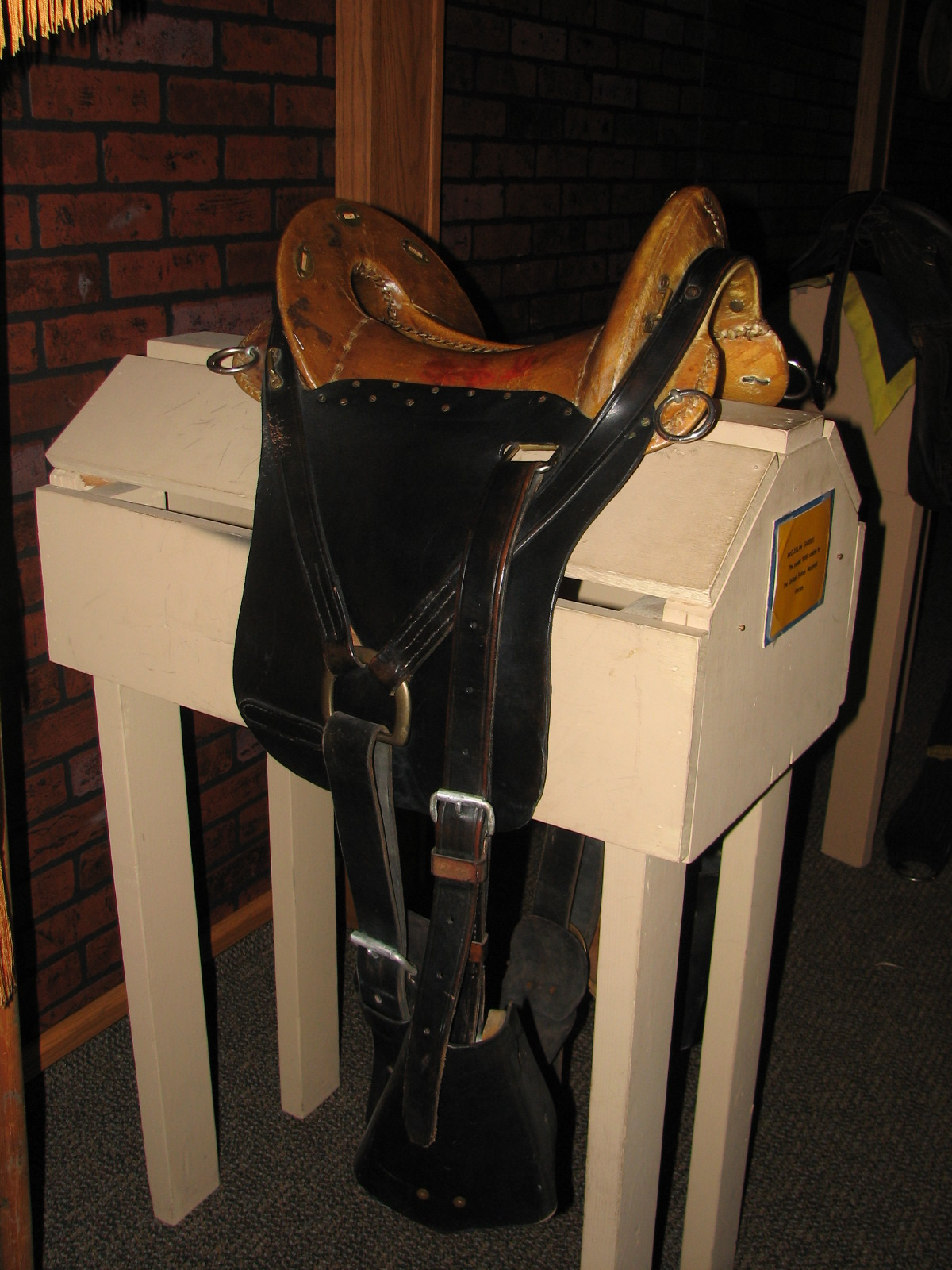
M1859 McClellan saddle of the Civil War period, displaying its rawhide seat covering. Fort Kearny State Park and Museum, Nebraska

The McClellan saddle is a riding saddle that was designed by George B. McClellan, after his tour of Europe as the member of a military commission charged with studying the latest developments in engineer and cavalry forces including field equipment. Based on his observations, McClellan proposed a design that was adopted by the US Army in 1859. The McClellan saddle was a success and continued in use in various forms until the US Army's last horse cavalry and horse artillery was dismounted late in World War II. Today, the McClellan saddle is used by ceremonial mounted units in the US Army. The saddle was used by several other nations, including Rhodesia and Mexico, and to a degree by the British in the Boer War. The saddle came in various seat sizes that predominantly ranged from approximately 11 to 12 ½ inches.

== Origin and development ==
In April 1855, six years before the start of the Civil War, Captain George B. McClellan sailed to Europe as part of a military commission to study developments in European tactics, weaponry, and logistics. McClellan's focus was the organization of engineer troops and cavalry. After the one-year tour, during which time McClellan observed several battles of the Crimean War, McClellan brought back almost 100 books and manuals. These he read before writing his report, which concluded with his proposed manual for American cavalry adapted from existing Russian cavalry regulations. He also proposed a cavalry saddle that he claimed was a modification of a Hungarian model used in the Prussian service. The saddle was almost certainly a modification of the Spanish tree saddle in common use in Mexico during this period, and which had become common in some parts of the US.

The McClellan saddle was adopted by the US War Department in 1859 and remained standard issue, in various models, for the remaining history of the horse cavalry. The original M1859 version was the form used during the Civil War, and the design saw subsequent modifications. The saddle always remained recognizable as McClellan's design, which included cavalry and artillery models. In addition, a model for packers was introduced as the M1913.

== Confederate variants in the Civil War ==
During the American Civil War, many Confederate cavalrymen provided their own horses and civilian saddles. In time, the Confederacy issued the Jenifer saddle. But when Southerners' horses grew thin because of inadequate food supply, the Jenifer saddle became painful to the bony withers of the horses. In 1863, the Confederate army issued the lighter and better-contoured McClellan saddle to its cavalry. Because leather was scarce in the South during the Civil War, many of the McClellan saddles had skirts of painted canvas. The Confederate Army also used some British saddles as well.

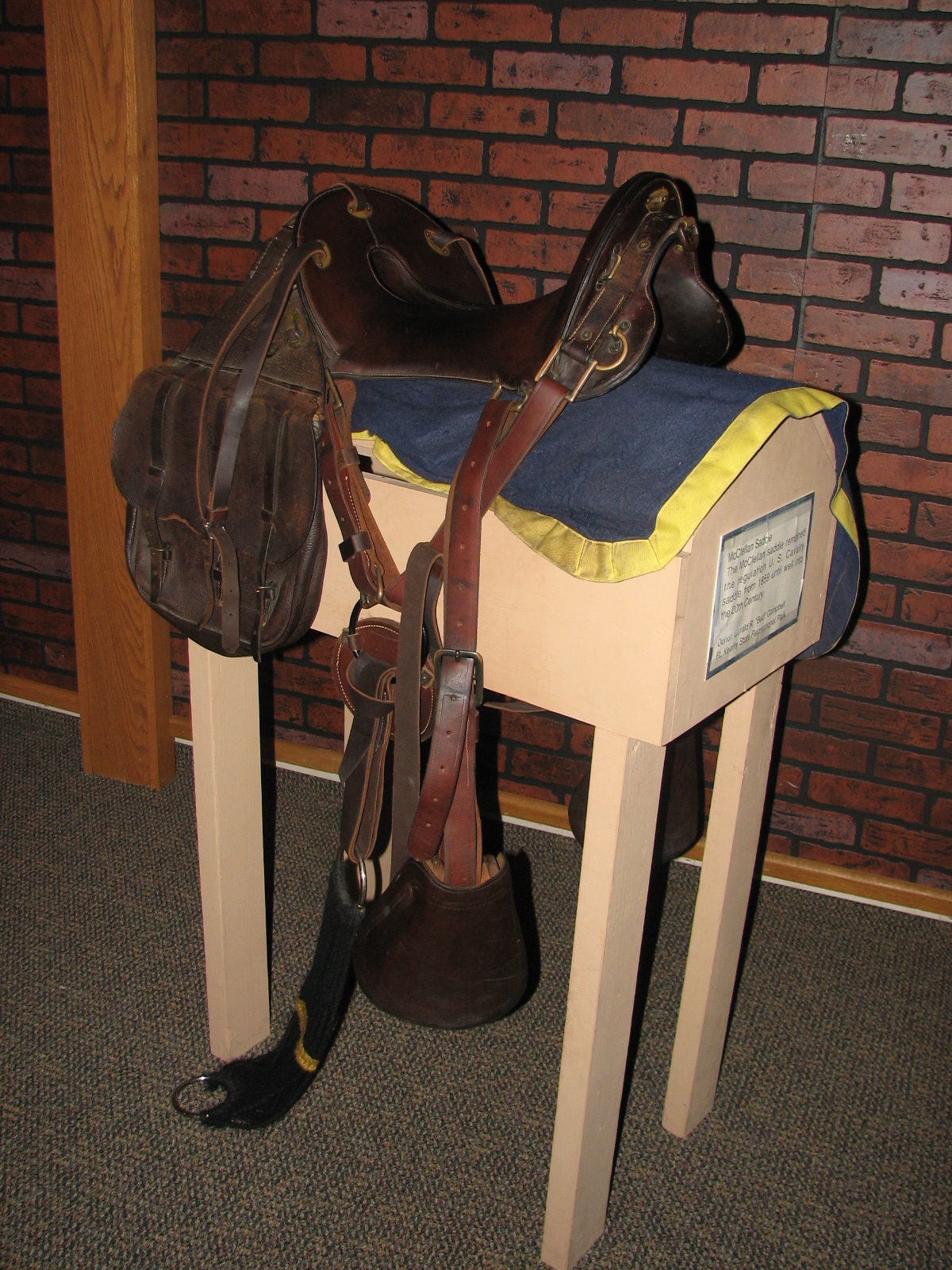
McClellan saddle in black leather, post-Civil War period. Fort Kearny State Museum

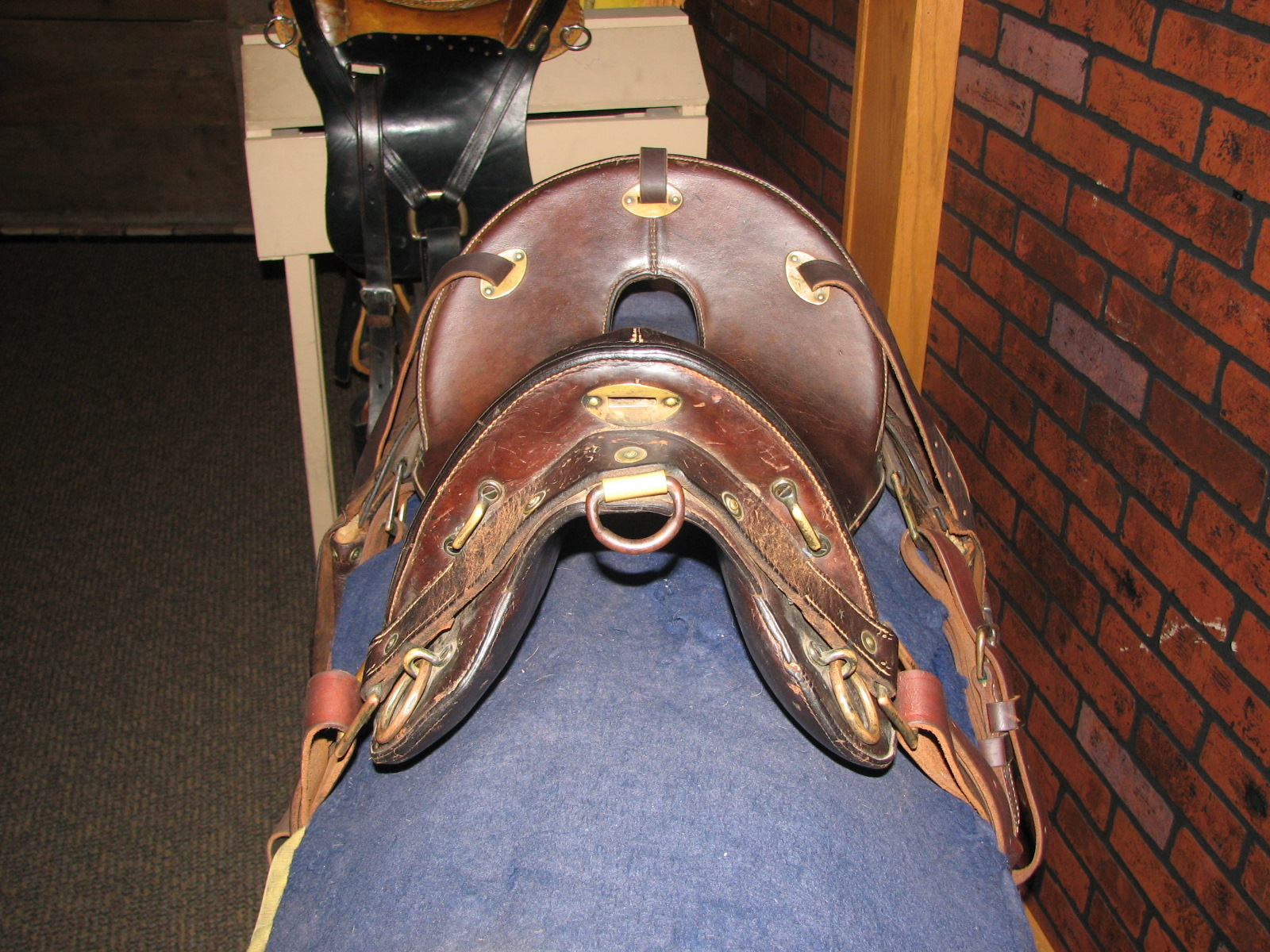
M1904 McClellan saddle in russet-brown leather, World War I period. Fort Kearny State Museum

== Influences on McClellan's design ==
The design was based on the Spanish tree saddles in wide use in the United States at the time, and which had seen US Army use, although McClellan claimed that it was based on Hussar saddles he had observed in use in the Crimean War. While McClellan did go overseas and observe the Crimean War for the US, the saddle does not closely duplicate any pattern in use by the armies in that conflict, but is very close to the widely used Spanish tree saddle, which was originally a saddle in common use in Mexico. The design underwent modifications over time, although in many ways it remained remarkably unchanged. The saddle was simple and less expensive than existing saddles, light enough not to burden the horse, but sturdy enough to give good support to the rider and his gear. It supported a rawhide-covered open seat, a thick leather skirt, wooden stirrups, and a girth strap of woolen yarn. Added accessories to the saddle sometimes included a nose bag for horse feed, a curry comb to groom the horse, a picket pin and lariat to tether the horse while grazing, saddlebags, and a "thimble" that held the muzzle of the cavalryman's carbine. The McClellan saddle was placed on top of a saddlecloth, shabrack, or saddle blanket.

== Service and rivals in the US Army ==
As noted above, the McClellan saddle served, and has continued to serve, for an extraordinarily long time in the U.S. Army. The saddle has been in uninterrupted use since 1859.

The saddle did see some modification over time. Perhaps the most significant alterations occurred in the 20th century, when the rigging was changed twice. The first time, an adjustable rigging was adopted, leading to the M1904 McClellan. That pattern is the most common of all McClellan saddles, and continued in use throughout World War I and World War II.

However, increased emphasis on equitation in the US Army also lead to the M1928, which was an M1904 with English rigging and fenders. This variant, the final one in US service, fit closer than other McClellan saddles, and is still used by the US Army in ceremonial uses.

The saddle, while passing the test of time, has not been without its rivals or critics. The first significant challenger was the Whitman saddle, named after a former US Army officer who designed it. The Whitman had many of the McClellan's features and is often mistaken for the McClellan. While not supplanting it, it was approved for use by officers and remained an approved officers' saddle throughout World War I. In later years, it incorporated so many McClellan features that it became known as the "Whitman-McClellan."

In the 20th century, a serious effort was made to replace the McClellan through tests of the US Army's M1912 equipments. The M1912 saddle proved to be unsuccessful in the Punitive Expedition, but it demonstrated a great departure from the McClellan design, resembling in some ways the British Universal Pattern saddle. Subsequently, the Army tested the M1917 saddle, but it was not adopted.

Enormous quantities of M1904 McClellans were purchased by the US Army in World War I, effectively preventing any new saddle from being adopted for general use for decades. The US Army did approve a saddle of the English saddle type prior to World War I for officers, and after the war approved another, with the adoption of the Philip's saddle for officers.

== Use and service outside the United States ==
The saddle also saw considerable civilian use, and was made for civilian sale by a variety of manufacturers. It was widely used in the United States by mounted policemen. It was adopted by Mexico, in a Mexican-made version, for their army. At least some were sold to the Dominion forces in the Boer War, and the North-West Mounted Police in Canada obtained at least a few for test purposes. The saddle was adopted by Rhodesia in the 1970s for use by the Grey's Scouts. South Africa used some quantities for mounted game wardens in the 1980s in South West Africa.

== Legacy and continued use ==
While the McClellan saddle was not perfect and had critics, it was one of the most enduring military saddles of all time, rivaled only by the British Universal Pattern saddle in its longevity. The saddle was used by every branch of the US Army, the US Marine Corps, and was widely used by mounted police units throughout the US.

The McClellan saddle continues to be made in the US, and was used by endurance riders at one time. It is made for use as a pleasure saddle for those few who like it for that purpose, and as a saddle for historical reenactors.
