= 105th New York Infantry Regiment =

Infantry regiment in the Union Army during the Civil War

- Active: October 1861 to March 17, 1863
- Country: United States
- Allegiance: Union
- Branch: Infantry
- Engagements: Battle of Cedar Mountain; Second Battle of Bull Run; Battle of Chantilly; Battle of South Mountain; Battle of Antietam; Battle of Fredericksburg

The 105th New York Infantry Regiment ("Le Roy Regiment") was an infantry regiment in the Union Army during the American Civil War.

== Service ==
The 105th New York Infantry was organized at LeRoy, New York beginning in November 1861 and mustered in for three years service on March 28, 1862 under the command of Colonel James M. Fuller.

The regiment was attached to Duryea's Brigade, Military District of Washington, to May 1862. 2nd Brigade, 2nd Division, Department of the Rappahannock, to June 1862. 1st Brigade, 2nd Division, III Corps, Army of Virginia, to September 1862. 1st Brigade, 2nd Division, I Corps, Army of the Potomac, to March 1863.

The 105th New York Infantry ceased to exist on March 28, 1863 when it was consolidated with the 94th New York Infantry as Companies F, G, and I.

== Detailed service ==
Left New York for Washington, D.C., April 4, 1862. Duty in the defenses of Washington, D.C., until May 11, 1862. Guarded the Orange & Alexandria Railroad to May 28. Expedition to Front Royal, Va., to intercept Jackson, May 28-June 1. Picket duty on the Shenandoah and at Front Royal, Va., until June 10. Duty at Catlett's Station, Warrenton, and Waterloo until August. Battle of Cedar Mountain August 9. Pope's Campaign in northern Virginia August 16-September 2. Fords of the Rappahannock August 21–23. Thoroughfare Gap August 28. Groveton August 29. Second Battle of Bull Run August 30. Chantilly September 1. Maryland Campaign September 6–22. Battles of South Mountain September 14; Antietam September 16–17. Duty at Sharpsburg, Md., until October 30. Movement to Falmouth, Va., October 30-November 19. Battle of Fredericksburg, Va., December 12–15. At Falmouth and Belle Plains until March, 1863. "Mud March" January 20–24.

== Casualties ==
The regiment lost a total of 90 men during service; 2 officers and 43 enlisted men killed or mortally wounded, 45 enlisted men died of disease.

== Commanders ==
- Colonel James M. Fuller
- Colonel Howard Carroll - mortally wounded in action at the Battle of Antietam
- Colonel John W. Shedd
- Captain John C. Whiteside - commanded at the Battle of Antietam after Col. Carroll was mortally wounded

== See also ==
- Collection of Adrian Fay
- List of New York Civil War regiments
- New York in the Civil War
