= Charles Day =

Charles Day may refer to:

- Boots Day (Charles Day, born 1947), former baseball player
- Charles Day (boot blacking manufacturer) (died 1836), founder of Day and Martins Blacking
- Charles Day (Medal of Honor) (1844–1901), American soldier in the American Civil War
- Charles Day (engineer) (1879–1931), American engineer and co-founder of Day & Zimmermann
- Charles Day (rower) (1914–1962), American rower
- Charlie Day (Charles Peckham Day, born 1976), American actor
- Charles Bernard Day (born 1957), American judicial nominee
- Charles Dewey Day (1806–1884), Canadian judge
- Charles W. Day (1836–1906), Wisconsin state senator from De Pere, Wisconsin
- Charles Wayne Day (1942–2008), American blues guitarist
