= 88th Pennsylvania Infantry Regiment =

Union Army infantry regiment

88th Regiment, Pennsylvania Volunteer Infantry
- Active: September 1861 to June 30, 1865
- Country: United States
- Allegiance: Union
- Branch: Infantry
- Engagements: Battle of Cedar Mountain; Second Battle of Bull Run; Battle of South Mountain; Battle of Antietam; Battle of Fredericksburg; Battle of Chancellorsville; Battle of Gettysburg; Bristoe Campaign; Mine Run Campaign; Battle of the Wilderness; Battle of Spotsylvania Court House; Battle of Totopotomoy Creek; Battle of Cold Harbor; Siege of Petersburg; Battle of Globe Tavern; Battle of Hatcher's Run; Appomattox Campaign; Battle of Five Forks; Battle of Appomattox Court House

The 88th Regiment, Pennsylvania Volunteer Infantry was an infantry regiment that served in the Union Army during the American Civil War.

== Service ==
The 88th Pennsylvania Infantry was organized at Philadelphia, Pennsylvania and mustered in for a three-year enlistment in September 1861 under the command of Colonel George P. McLean.

The regiment was attached to 1st Brigade, Ord's 2nd Division, Department of the Rappahannock, to June 1862. 2nd Brigade, 2nd Division, III Corps, Army of Virginia, to September 1862. 2nd Brigade, 2nd Division, I Corps, Army of the Potomac, to March 1863. 3rd Brigade, 2nd Division, I Corps, to May 1863. 2nd Brigade, 2nd Division, I Corps, to March 1864. 2nd Brigade, 2nd Division, V Corps, to June 1864. 2nd Brigade, 3rd Division, V Corps, to March 1865. 3rd Brigade, 3rd Division, V Corps, to June 1865.

The 88th Pennsylvania Infantry mustered out of service June 30, 1865.

== Detailed service ==
Left Pennsylvania for Washington, D.C., October 1. At Kendall Green, Washington, D.C., until October 12. Provost duty at Alexandria until April 17, 1862. (Companies A, C, D, E, and I garrisoned forts on the Maryland side of the Potomac River February 18 to April 17.) At Cloud's Mills, Va., April 17–23. Guarded the Orange & Alexandria Railroad between Bull Run and Fairfax Court House until May 7. Duty near Fredericksburg, Va., until May 25. Expedition to Front Royal to intercept Jackson May 25-June 18. Duty at Manassas, Warrenton, and Culpeper until August. Battle of Cedar Mountain August 9. Pope's Campaign in northern Virginia August 16-September 2. Fords of the Rappahannock August 21–23. Thoroughfare Gap August 28. Second Battle of Bull Run August 30. Chantilly September 1. Maryland Campaign September 6–24. Battles of South Mountain September 14; Antietam September 16–17. Duty near Sharpsburg, Md., until October 30. Movement to Falmouth, Va., October 30-November 19. Battle of Fredericksburg December 12–15. Burnside's 2nd Campaign, "Mud March," January 20–24, 1863. At Falmouth and Belle Plains until April 27. Chancellorsville Campaign April 27-May 6. Operations at Pollock's Mill Creek April 29-May 2. Fitzhugh's Crossing April 29–30. Chancellorsville May 2–5. Gettysburg Campaign June 11-July 24. Battle of Gettysburg July 1–3. Pursuit of Lee July 5–24. Duty on line of the Rappahannock until October. Bristoe Campaign October 9–22. Advance to line of the Rappahannock November 7–8. Mine Run Campaign November 26-December 2. Demonstration on the Rapidan February 6–7, 1864. Regiment reenlisted February 6, 1864, and on furlough until April 7. Rapidan Campaign May 4-June 12. Battle of the Wilderness May 5–7; Laurel Hill May 8; Spotsylvania May 8–12; Spottsylvania Court House May 12–21. Assault on the Salient May 12. North Anna River May 23–26. Jericho Ford May 25. On line of the Pamunkey May 26–28. Totopotomoy May 28–31. Cold Harbor June 1–12. Bethesda Church June 1–3. White Oak Swamp June 13. Before Petersburg June 16–18. Siege of Petersburg June 16, 1864 to April 2, 1865. Mine Explosion, Petersburg, July 30, 1864 (reserve). Weldon Railroad August 18–21. Hatcher's Run October 27–28. Warren's Expedition to Weldon Railroad December 7–12. Dabney's Mills, Hatcher's Run, February 5–7, 1865. Appomattox Campaign March 28-April 9. Lewis Farm near Gravelly Run March 29. White Oak Road March 30–31. Five Forks April 1. Pursuit of Lee April 2–9. Appomattox Court House April 9. Surrender of Lee and his army. Moved to Washington, D.C., May 1–12. Grand Review of the Armies May 23.

== Casualties ==
The regiment lost a total of 181 men during service; 8 officers and 101 enlisted men killed or mortally wounded, 72 enlisted men died from disease-related causes.

== Commanders ==
- Colonel George P. McLean
- Colonel George W. Gile -commanded at the Second Battle of Bull Run while still at the rank of major after Ltc McLean was killed; commanded at the Battle of Antietam until wounded in action
- Colonel Louis Wagner
- Lieutenant Colonel Joseph A. McLean - commanded the regiment at the Second Battle of Bull Run; killed in action
- Major Benezet F. Foust - commanded at the Battle of Gettysburg until wounded on July 1
- Major David A. Griffith - commanded at the Battle of Fredericksburg
- Captain Henry B. Meyers - commanded at the Battle of Antietam after Maj Gile was wounded
- Captain Henry Whiteside - commanded at the Battle of Gettysburg after Maj Foust was wounded

== Notable members ==
- 2nd Lieutenant Robert Burns Beath, Company D - 12th Commander-in-Chief of the Grand Army of the Republic, 1883-1884
- Private James G. Clark, Company F - Medal of Honor recipient for action during the Siege of Petersburg
- 1st Sergeant Edward L. Gilligan, Company E - Medal of Honor recipient for action at the Battle of Gettysburg
- 1st Lieutenant Sylvester Hopkins Martin, Company K - Medal of Honor recipient for action at the Battle of Globe Tavern
- 1st Sergeant William Sands, Company G - Medal of Honor recipient for action at the Battle of Hatcher's Run

== See also ==
- List of Pennsylvania Civil War Units
- Pennsylvania in the Civil War
