= 210th Pennsylvania Infantry Regiment =

Union Army infantry regiment

210th Pennsylvania Volunteer Infantry
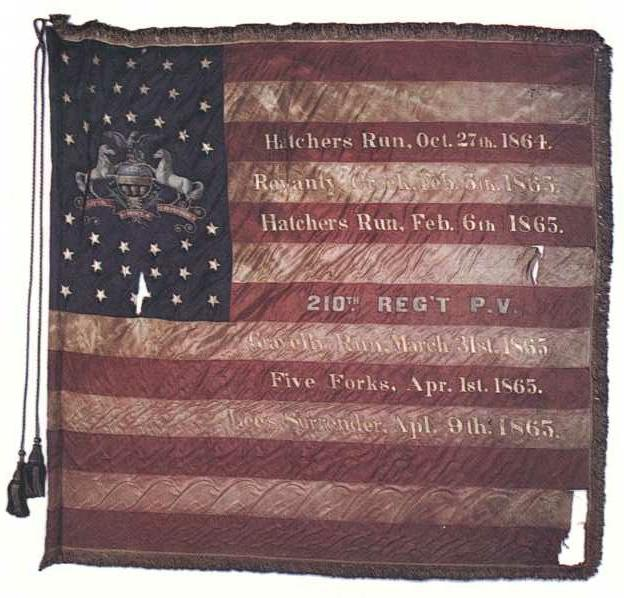
- Flag of the 210th Pennsylvania Infantry
- Active: September 12, 1864 – May 30, 1865
- Country: United States
- Allegiance: Union
- Branch: Infantry
- Engagements: American Civil War: Siege of Petersburg; Battle of Boydton Plank Road; Stony Creek (Weldon Railroad) Raid; Battle of Hatcher's Run; Appomattox Campaign; Battle of Lewis's Farm; Battle of White Oak Road; Battle of Five Forks; Battle of Appomattox Court House

Commanders
- Notable commanders: Col. William Sergeant

The 210th Pennsylvania Volunteer Infantry was an infantry regiment that served in the Union Army during the American Civil War.

== Service ==
The 210th Pennsylvania Infantry was organized at Harrisburg, Pennsylvania beginning September 12, 1864 and mustered on September 28, 1864, under the command of Colonel William Sergeant.

The regiment was attached to 3rd Brigade, 2nd Division, V Corps, Army of the Potomac.

The 210th Pennsylvania Infantry mustered out of service on May 30, 1865.

== Detailed service ==
Siege of Petersburg, Va., October 1864 to April 1865. Boydton Plank Road, Hatcher's Run October 27–28, 1864. Warren's Raid on Weldon Railroad December 7–12. Dabney's Mills, Hatcher's Run, February 5–7, 1865. Appomattox Campaign March 28-April 9. Lewis's Farm near Gravelly Run March 29. White Oak Road March 30–31. Five Forks April 1. Appomattox Court House April 9. Surrender of Lee and his army. Marched to Washington, D.C., May 1–12. Grand Review of the Armies May 23.

== Casualties ==
The regiment lost a total of 85 men during service; 3 officers and 37 enlisted men killed or mortally wounded, 1 officer and 44 enlisted men died of disease.

== Commanders ==
- Colonel William Sergeant - mortally wounded in action at the Battle of White Oak Road; died April 11, 1865
- Lieutenant Colonel Edward L. Witman - led the regiment after White Oak Road, commissioned Colonel April 12, 1865, but never mustered at rank. Served as Captain of Company D, 46th Pennsylvania Volunteer Infantry prior to the 210th

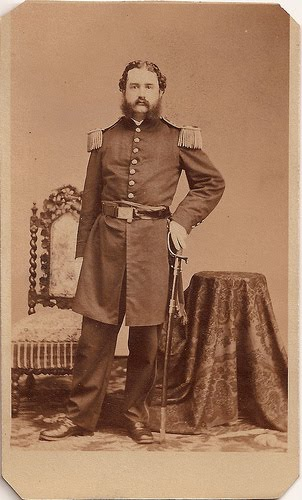
Col. William Sergeant, 210th PA Vols.

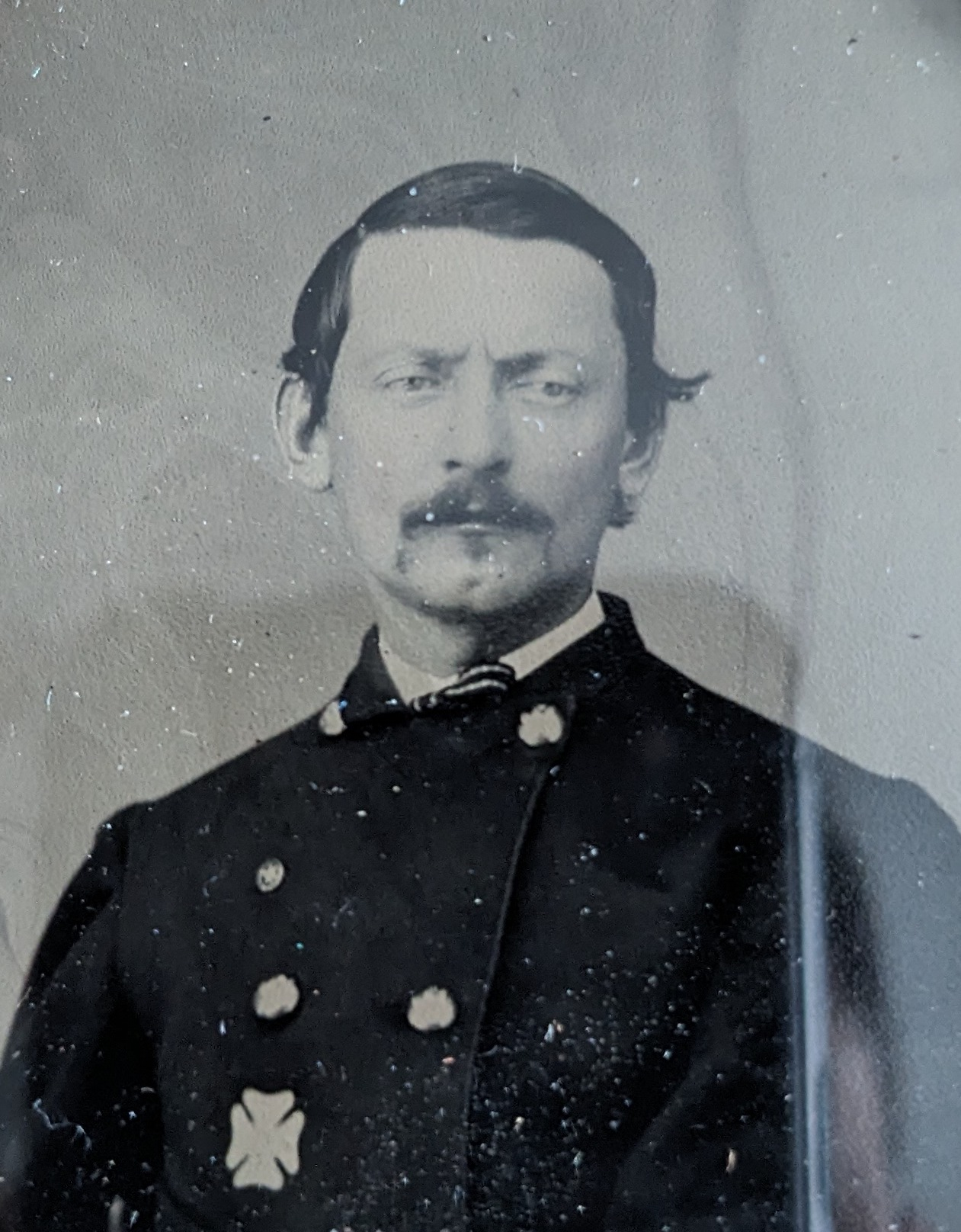
Lt. Col. Edward L. Witman, 210th PA

== Medals of Honor ==
- Private Charles Day, Company K - Medal of Honor recipient for action at the Battle of Hatcher's Run
- Assistant Surgeon Jacob F. Raub of the 210th - Medal of Honor recipient for action at the Battle of Hatcher's Run

== See also ==
- List of Pennsylvania Civil War Units
- Pennsylvania in the Civil War
