= James G. Clark =

James G. Clark may refer to:

- James G. Clark (Medal of Honor), American Civil War soldier and Medal of Honor recipient
- Jim Clark (sheriff) (James Gardner Clark Jr.), sheriff of Dallas County, Alabama, United States
- Jimmy Clark (boxer) (James G. Clark), American boxer

== See also ==
- James Clark (disambiguation)
