= John C. Sagelhurst =

American civil war soldier

John Christopher Sagelhurst
- Born: June 1, 1841; Buffalo, New York
- Died: May 10, 1907 (aged 65)
- Burial place: Buffalo, New York
- Military career
- Allegiance: United States of America
- Branch: United States Army
- Rank: Sergeant
- Units: Company B, 1st New Jersey Cavalry
- Conflicts: Battle of Hatcher's Run; American Civil War
- Awards: Medal of Honor

John Christopher Sagelhurst (June 1, 1841 - May 10, 1907) was an American soldier who fought in the American Civil War. Sagelhurst received his country's highest award for bravery during combat, the Medal of Honor. Sagelhurst's medal was won for his gallantry at the Battle of Hatcher's Run in Virginia on February 6, 1865. He was honored with the award on January 3, 1906.

Sagelhurst was born in Buffalo, New York, entered service in Jersey City, New Jersey, and was later buried in Buffalo.

== Medal of Honor citation ==
The President of the United States of America, in the name of Congress, takes pleasure in presenting the Medal of Honor to Sergeant John Christopher Sagelhurst, United States Army, for extraordinary heroism on 6 February 1865, while serving with Company B, 1st New York Cavalry, in action at Hatcher's Run, Virginia. Under a heavy fire from the enemy, Sergeant Sagelhurst carried off the field a commissioned officer who was severely wounded and also led a charge on the enemy's rifle pits.

== See also ==
- List of American Civil War Medal of Honor recipients: Q–S
