= James Coey =

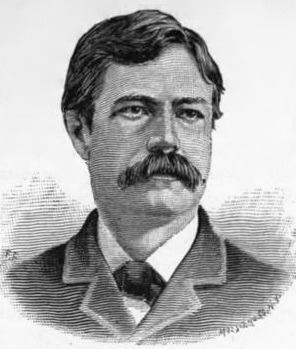
- Born: February 12, 1841; New York City, US
- Died: July 14, 1918 (aged 77); Berkeley, California, US
- Burial place: San Francisco National Cemetery
- Military career
- Allegiance: United States of America
- Branch: United States Army
- Service years: 1862 – 1865
- Rank: Brevet Colonel
- Unit: (New York (state)) 147th Regiment, New York Volunteer Infantry
- Conflicts: American Civil War: Battle of the Wilderness; Battle of Hatcher's Run
- Awards: Medal of Honor

James Coey (February 12, 1841 – July 14, 1918) was a United States military officer who fought with the Union Army as a member of the 147th New York Volunteer Infantry Regiment during the American Civil War. Twice brevetted for "conspicuous gallantry" and "meritorious service", he also received his nation's highest award for valor, the U.S. Medal of Honor, which was conferred on May 12, 1892, in recognition of his efforts to rally his brigade around regimental colors and inspire a charge on the enemy during the Battle of Hatcher's Run, Virginia on February 6, 1865.

Post-war, he held multiple federal and state government positions, including: U.S. Collector of Internal Revenue, District of San Francisco, California; U.S. Postmaster, San Francisco; U.S. Assessor, Internal Revenue Service (Utah Territory); Brigadier-General, 2nd Brigade, California National Guard; and Major-General, commanding, California National Guard.

== Formative years ==
Born in New York City, New York on February 12, 1841, James Coey was a son of Elizabeth (Carlisle) Coey, a native of Ireland who had been born circa 1807. He was reared and educated in New York with his siblings: William John (1828–1895) and Samuel (born circa 1845).

== Civil War ==
James Coey enlisted for Civil War military service at the age of 21. After enrolling in Oswego County on August 21, 1862, he was officially mustered in for duty on September 11 with Company E of the 147th New York Volunteer Infantry. He was then commissioned as a first lieutenant of E Company on October 4 of that year, and as E Company's captain on February 4, 1863. Placed on detached duty in July 1863 and assigned to service at the Union's military prison at Elmira, New York, he remained there through at least August of that year, and then returned to duty with his regiment.

On May 7, 1864, the final day of the Battle of the Wilderness, he was "severely wounded at Laurel Hill, Wilderness, Va." In recognition of his valor, he was commissioned as a major with his regiment on December 28 of that year.

On February 6, 1865, he was then severely wounded again — this time, during the Battle of Hatcher's Run. According to his Medal of Honor citation, which was awarded for his actions that day, he grabbed his regiment's colors while urging his brigade to charge a Confederate army position. Wounded during that charge, he ordered his subordinates to lift him up onto his horse, and continued to push his brigade to halt the enemy's advance. Brevetted as a lieutenant colonel with the U.S. Volunteers on March 13, 1865 "for conspicuous gallantry in the battles of the Wilderness and at Laurel Hill, Va.", he was brevetted again to the rank of Colonel, U.S. Volunteers on April 9 of that year "for gallant and meritorious services during the war, and in the recent campaign, terminating in the surrender of General Robert E. Lee." Placed in command of his regiment during the final year of the war, he mustered out with his regiment on June 7, 1865.

According to his U.S. Civil War Pension records, he sustained a gunshot wound to the face, which resulted in total deafness in his right ear, facial paralysis, and the loss of smell.

== Post-war life ==
Following his honorable discharge from the military, Coey returned home to New York, where he resided in the town of Redfield with his widowed mother and brothers, William and Samuel, in 1865. Also residing at the home were his maternal uncle, Thomas Carlisle; three nephews, William John (Jr.), Milton B. and Charles P. Coey, who were sons of his older brother William and later grew up to become prominent bankers in the state of Washington; and three individuals documented on that year's New York State Census as servants. Records that year also documented that James Coey and his brother, William, were employed as accountants while their brother, Samuel, was employed as a farmer.

Sometime around 1866, James Coey married Pennsylvania native Maria L. Reynolds (1844–1925), and relocated with her to California. In 1868, he was appointed as the U.S. Collector of Internal Revenue for the District of San Francisco. From 1869 to 1870, he served as the U.S. Postmaster for San Francisco.

According to the federal census, by 1870, Coey and his wife were residing at a sizeable boarding house operated by Harriet Hannah in the City of San Francisco's 10th Ward. In 1871, he was appointed U.S. Assessor for the Internal Revenue Service's Utah Territory. The next year, on August 15, 1872, he and his wife greeted the arrival of daughter Louise.

Appointed as Appraiser of Merchandise for San Francisco in 1873, he then was re-appointed as Postmaster of San Francisco (from 1874 to 1878) while also serving as brigadier-general of the 2nd Brigade, California National Guard and then major-general commanding of the CNG (both in 1875). On January 5, 1878, he and his wife greeted the arrival of their second daughter, Emily.

Serving an additional term as San Francisco's Postmaster from 1878 to 1882, he resided with his family at 621 Bush Street in San Francisco during the 1880s and early 1890s, at 2516 Clay Street in 1892, and at 1229 Jackson Street by 1896. Around this same time, he was awarded a U.S. Civil War pension at the rate of $60 per month (October 23, 1890) in recognition of his battle-wound-related disabilities.

During this time, he was also active politically and with the Grand Army of the Republic. Appointed as a delegate at large from California to the National Republican Convention in Chicago, Illinois in 1868, he also played a key role in organizing the G.A.R.'s Department of California, Oregon, Nevada and Arizona that year. Elected as first department commander, California (1868-1869) and junior vice commander-in-chief (1870-1871), he then also served as a member of the G.A.R.'s National Council of Administration from 1868 to 1874. He was also a companion of the California Commandery of the Military Order of the Loyal Legion of the United States.

Still residing with his wife and two daughters on Jackson Street in San Francisco's 42nd Ward after the turn of the century, Coey had exchanged his life in public service for one in the mining industry. Also residing at Coey's home at this time were his mother-in-law, Louise Reynolds, and Eliza Flinn, a boarder who was employed as a nurse. On October 14, 1916, his U.S. Civil War Pension was increased to $70 per month.

== Death and interment ==
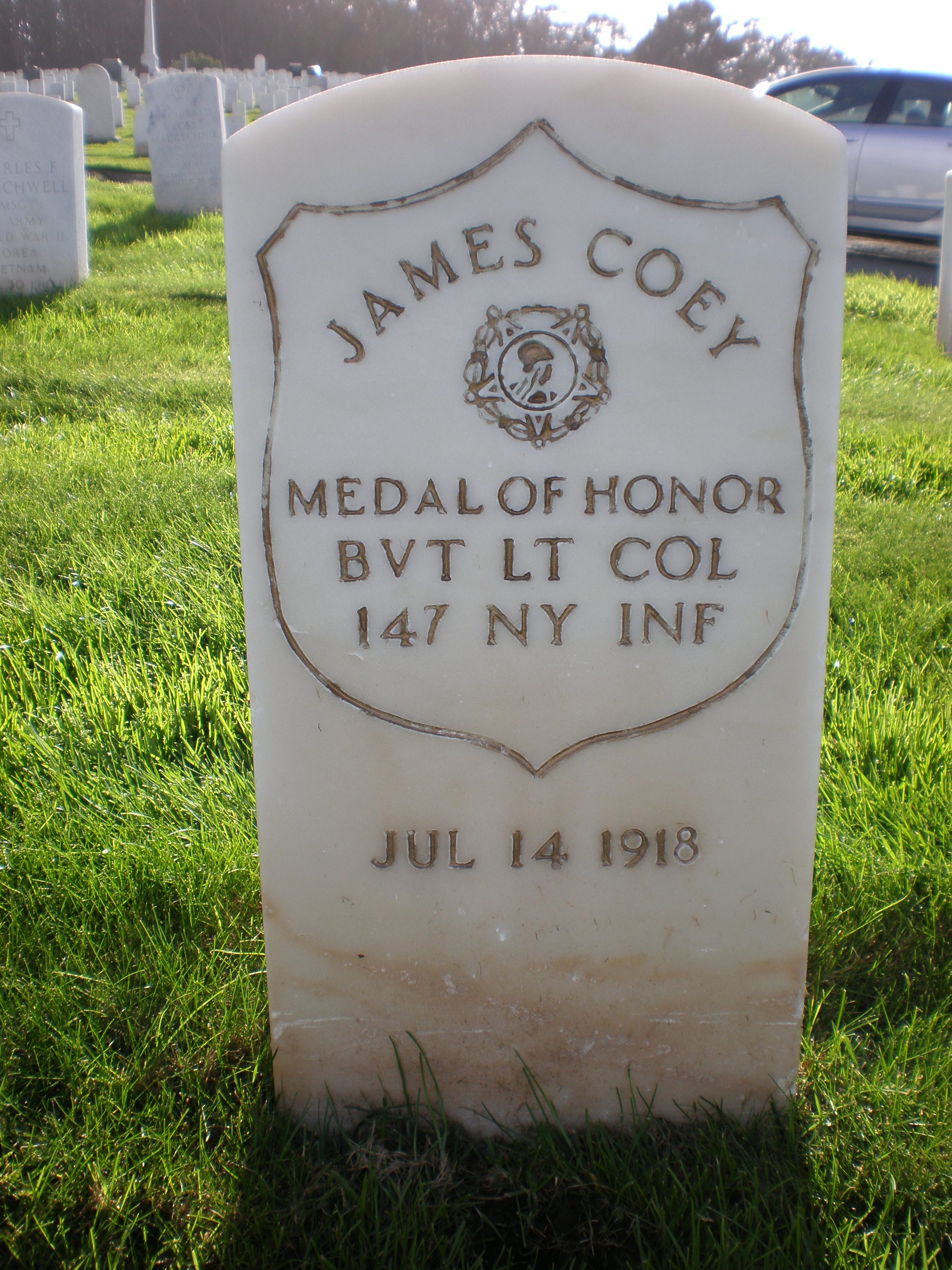
Bvt. Lt. Col. James Coey's headstone, San Francisco National Cemetery at the Presidio (© BrokenSphere/Wikimedia Commons)

Preceded in death by his older brother, William, who died on April 21, 1895, James Coey lived on for more than two decades until dying at his home at 2640 Derby Street in Berkeley, California on July 14, 1918. Following funeral services, he was laid to rest with military honors at the San Francisco National Cemetery. His wife and daughters, "Miss Louise Coey and Mrs. Franklin Hittell, all of whom [were] living at the Coey home on Derby Street" at the time of Coey's death, according to the San Francisco Chronicle. His widow was then interred beside him following her death on April 24, 1925.

== Medal of Honor citation ==
Seized the regimental colors at a critical moment and by a prompt advance on the enemy caused the entire brigade to follow him; and, after being himself severely wounded, he caused himself to be lifted into the saddle and a second time rallied the line in an attempt to check the enemy.

== See also ==
- List of American Civil War Medal of Honor recipients: A–F
