= Jacob F. Raub =

American army surgeon and Medal of Honor recipient

- Born: May 13, 1840; Raubsville, Pennsylvania, US
- Died: May 21, 1906 (aged 66); Washington, D.C., US
- Burial place: Arlington National Cemetery
- Spouse: Jane S. Weaver (m. 1864)
- Children: 3
- Military career
- Allegiance: United States of America
- Branch: Union Army
- Service years: 1864–1865
- Rank: Assistant Surgeon
- Unit: 210th Pennsylvania Infantry
- Conflicts: American Civil War; Siege of Petersburg; Battle of Boydton Plank Road; Wilson–Kautz Raid; Battle of Hatcher's Run; Appomattox Campaign; Battle of Lewis's Farm; Battle of White Oak Road; Battle of Five Forks; Battle of Appomattox Court House
- Awards: Medal of Honor

Jacob F. Raub (May 13, 1840 – May 21, 1906) was an American soldier and surgeon who fought with the Union Army in the American Civil War. Raub received his country's highest award for bravery during combat, the Medal of Honor, for actions taken on February 5, 1865, during the Battle of Hatcher's Run.

== Early life ==
Raub was born in Raubsville, Pennsylvania, on May 13, 1840. Raub attained a Doctor of Medicine degree in 1864.

== Civil War ==
Raub served with the 210th Pennsylvania Infantry Regiment during the American Civil War, Raub was mustered into service on September 13, 1864 as an assistant surgeon.

=== Battle of Hatcher's Run ===
On February 5, 1865, during the Battle of Hatcher's Run, Raub volunteered to tend wounded soldiers in the middle of severe gunfire and then took up arms himself and began to fight after noticing Confederate soldiers about to launch a surprise attack from a position his regiment was initially not prepared to defend. Raub mustered out of service with the rest of the regiment on May 30, 1865.

Raub received the Medal of Honor on April 20, 1896, some 31 years after his actions.

=== Medal of Honor citation ===
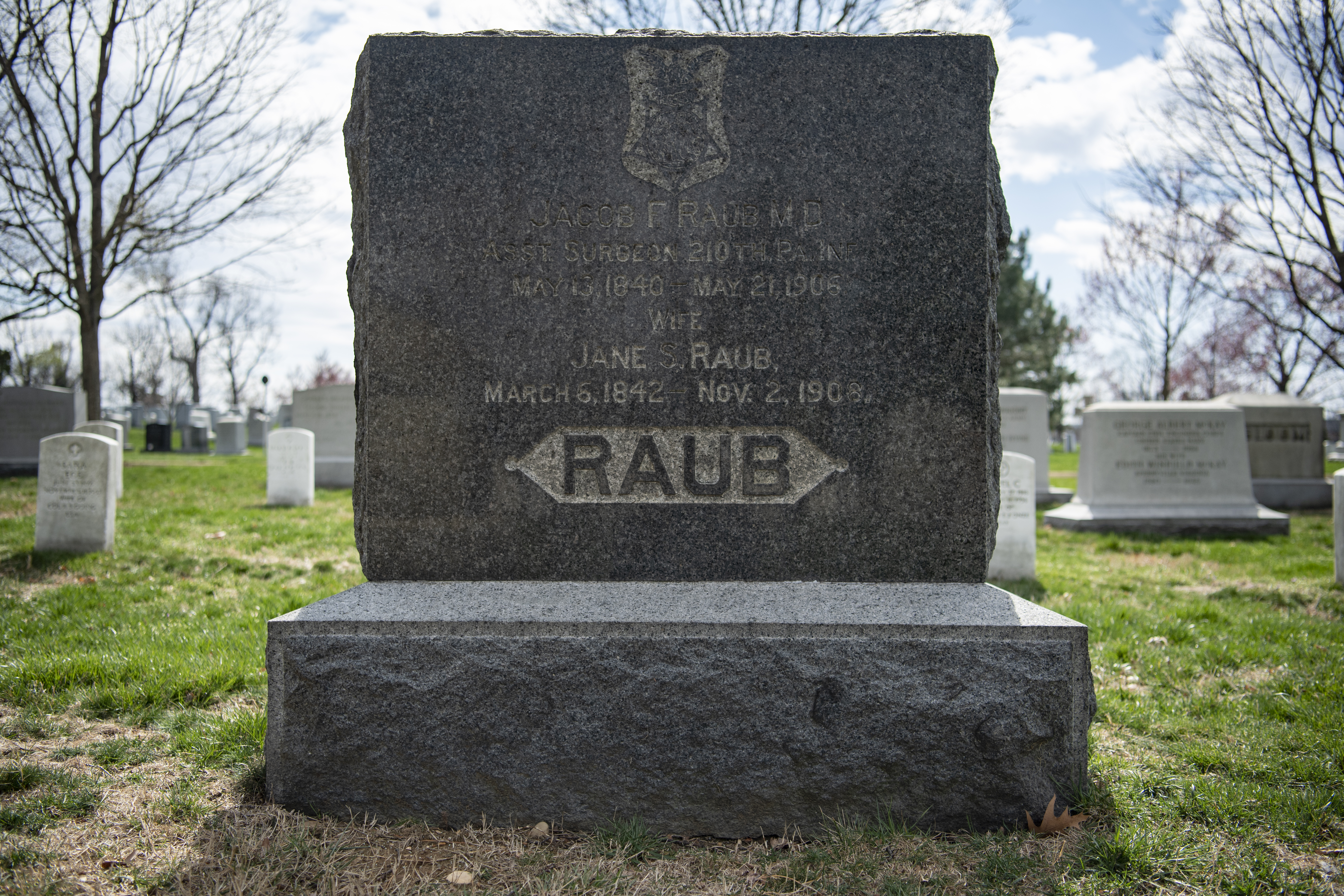
Raub's grave at Arlington National Cemetery

The President of the United States of America, in the name of Congress, takes pleasure in presenting the Medal of Honor to Assistant Surgeon Jacob F. Raub, United States Army, for extraordinary heroism on 5 February 1865, while serving with 210th Pennsylvania Infantry, in action at Hatcher's Run, Virginia. Discovering a flank movement by the enemy, Assistant Surgeon Raub appraised the commanding general at great peril, and though a noncombatant voluntarily participated with the troops in repelling this attack.

== Personal life ==
Raub married Jane S. Weaver, the third of nine siblings, on September 16, 1864. The couple had three children, born in 1867, 1870, and 1874, respectively.

Raub and his wife Jane S. (1842–1908) are buried at Arlington National Cemetery.
