= John Thompson (soldier, born 1838) =

John J. Thompson (August 14, 1838 - July 2, 1915) was a German-born soldier in the Union Army in the American Civil War. The medal was granted for actions at the Battle of Hatcher's Run on 6 February, 1865 whilst serving as a Corporal in the 1st Maryland Infantry. Thompson was born the Duchy of Holstein, (then controlled by Denmark) and died in Baltimore, Maryland where he was buried in Immanuel Cemetery.

== Medal of Honor Citation ==
As color bearer with most conspicuous gallantry preceded his regiment in the assault and planted his flag upon the enemy's works.

Date Issued: 10 September, 1897
