= Edward L. Gilligan =

Edward Lyons Gilligan
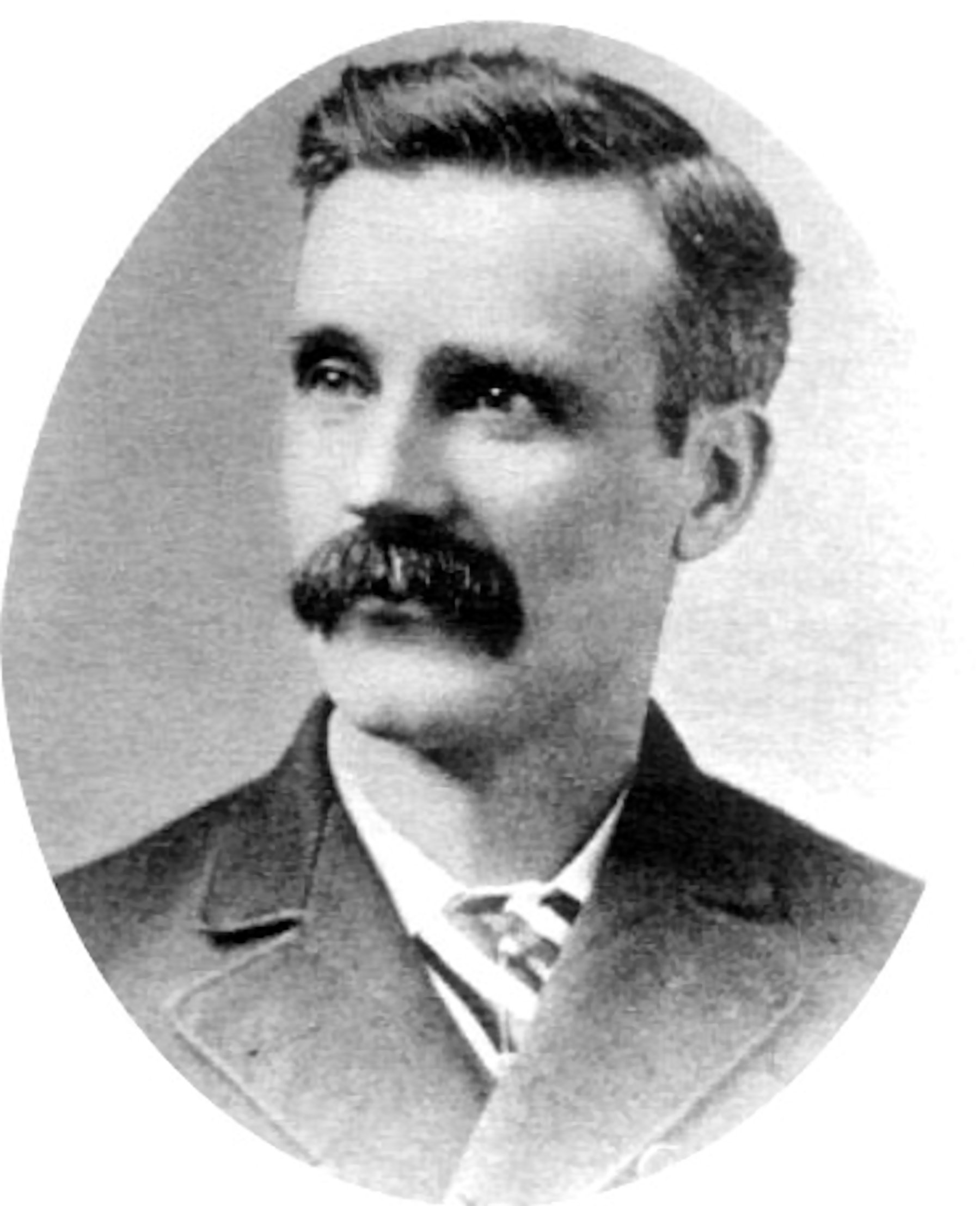
- Born: April 18, 1843; Philadelphia, Pennsylvania
- Died: April 2, 1922 (aged 78); Oxford, Pennsylvania
- Burial place: Oxford Cemetery, Oxford, Pennsylvania
- Military career
- Allegiance: United States of America
- Branch: United States Army; Union Army
- Service years: 1861–1865
- Rank: Captain
- Units: Company E, 88th Pennsylvania Volunteer Infantry Regiment
- Conflicts: Third Battle of Petersburg; American Civil War
- Awards: Medal of Honor

Edward Lyons Gilligan (April 18, 1843 – April 2, 1922) was an American soldier who fought in the American Civil War. Gilligan received his country's highest award for bravery during combat, the Medal of Honor. Gilligan's medal was won after he assisted in the capture of a Confederate flag. He was honored with the award on April 30, 1892.

Gilligan joined the Army from Philadelphia in October 1861. He was commissioned as an officer in October 1864, and mustered out with his regiment in June 1865. Gilligan was buried in Oxford, Pennsylvania.

== Medal of Honor citation ==
The President of the United States of America, in the name of Congress, takes pleasure in presenting the Medal of Honor to First Sergeant Edward Lyons Gilligan, United States Army, for extraordinary heroism on 1 July 1863, while serving with Company E, 88th Pennsylvania Infantry, in action at Gettysburg, Pennsylvania. First Sergeant Gilligan assisted in the capture of a Confederate flag by knocking down the color sergeant.

== See also ==
- List of Medal of Honor recipients for the Battle of Gettysburg
- List of American Civil War Medal of Honor recipients: G–L
