= William Sands (soldier) =

American soldier (1835–1918)

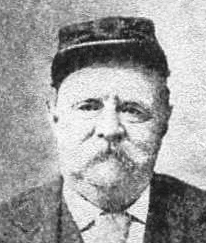
- William Sands, c. 1903
- Born: October 14, 1835; Reading, Pennsylvania, U.S.
- Died: October 31, 1918 (aged 83); Norristown, Pennsylvania, U.S.
- Burial place: Charles Evans Cemetery; Reading, Pennsylvania, U.S.
- Military career
- Allegiance: United States
- Branch: U.S. Army (Union Army)
- Service years: April 23—July 29, 1861; September 12, 1861—May 31, 1865
- Units: 7th Pennsylvania Reserve Regiment (private); Company G, 88th Pennsylvania Infantry (principal musician and first sergeant)
- Conflicts: American Civil War; Battle of Cedar Mountain; Second Battle of Bull Run; Battle of Antietam; Burnside's Mud March; Battle of Gettysburg; Overland Campaign; Battle of Spotsylvania Court House; Battle of North Anna; Battle of Totopottomoy Creek; Siege of Petersburg; Battle of Dabney's Mill/Hatcher's Run; Appomattox Campaign; Battle of Five Forks; Battle of Amelia Springs
- Awards: Medal of Honor

William Sands (October 14, 1835 – October 31, 1918) was a United States soldier who fought with the Union Army during the American Civil War as a principal musician with the 88th Pennsylvania Infantry and, later, as a first sergeant with that same regiment. He received his nation's highest award for valor, the U.S. Medal of Honor, for capturing an enemy flag and carrying it from behind Confederate States Army lines to those of the Union Army during the Battle of Dabney's Mill/Hatcher's Run, Virginia (February 6–7, 1865). That award was conferred on November 9, 1893.

== Formative years ==
Born in Reading, Pennsylvania on October 14, 1835, William Sands was a son of Harriet Sands. He was reared and educated in that city before embarking on his own journey as a married man during the late 1850s. By mid-June 1860, he and his wife, Hetty, were residing in Reading's South East Ward with their six-month-old son, George.

== Civil War ==
Having enrolled just ten days after the April 13, 1861 fall of Fort Sumter to the Confederate States Army, William Sands narrowly missed earning the designation of “First Defender,” which was awarded to those men from the Commonwealth of Pennsylvania who were members of the first five regiments to respond to President Abraham Lincoln's call for volunteers to preserve America's union. Sands was, however, among the next group of men who answered that call; after enrolling for military service in Reading, Pennsylvania on April 23, he officially mustered in for duty that same day at Camp Curtin in Harrisburg as a private with Company G of the 7th Pennsylvania Infantry. In short order, he and his regiment were moved to Chambersburg, where they remained in camp for a month before receiving a directive to head south. Departing on June 8, they made camp again on June 19 at Williamsport, Maryland, where they remained until July 2 when they were marched to Martinsburg, Virginia and then Charlestown. Their three months’ service completed, Sands and his regiment were ordered back to Harrisburg, where they honorably mustered out on July 29, 1861.

Sands then promptly re-enlisted for another tour of duty. After re-enrolling in Philadelphia on September 12, 1861, he officially re-mustered in there that same day for a three-year term of service with the 88th Pennsylvania Infantry as a field musician with the regiment's B Company (also known as the Neversink Zouaves). Military records at the time described him as being a 25-year-old painter residing in Berks County who was 5’ 6-1/2” tall with sandy hair, brown eyes and a light complexion.

Transported by rail to Washington, D.C. in early October 1861, Sands and his fellow 88th Pennsylvania Volunteers helped to defend the nation's capital through October 12 when they were moved to Alexandria, Virginia and assigned to guard duty, a mission they continued to perform at various duty stations through May 25, 1862 when they were marched to Front Royal, placed on a train, and transported to Manassas, Warrenton and Culpeper. Their first major combat test came in the Battle of Cedar Mountain (August 9), where they served in Brigadier-General Zealous Bates Tower's brigade at the far right of the Union Army commanded by Major General Nathaniel P. Banks. The battle successfully concluded, they were moved to Pony Mountain and Warrenton before engaging in operations near Thoroughfare Gap, Gainesville and Manassas Junction. Commended by General John Pope for their performance in the Second Battle of Bull Run (August 29–30), the 88th Pennsylvanians were then ordered on to Fairfax, Washington and Frederick before participating in the intense combat of the Battle of Antietam (September 17). After re-engaging with the enemy near Bowling Green on December 13, Sands and his regiment were ordered to make camp for the winter at Fletcher's Chapel, where they remained until they were assigned to participate in Major-General Ambrose Burnside's Mud March (mid-January 1863). Returned to winter quarters after the failed operation, they next engaged the enemy at points along the Rappahannock River (April 28), and were then reassigned to Major-General John F. Reynolds’ corps as part of the Gettysburg campaign. On day one of the Battle of Gettysburg (July 1, 1863), Sands was captured by Confederate troops.

Paroled during a prisoner exchange, Sands returned to his unit and, after a brief period of recuperation, rejoined the fight. While the regiment was stationed at its winter quarters in Culpeper, Virginia, a significant number of 88th Pennsylvania Volunteers re-enlisted, including Sands who re-enrolled on February 4, 1864, was promoted to the rank of principal musician, and transferred to the regiment's central command (field and staff officers).

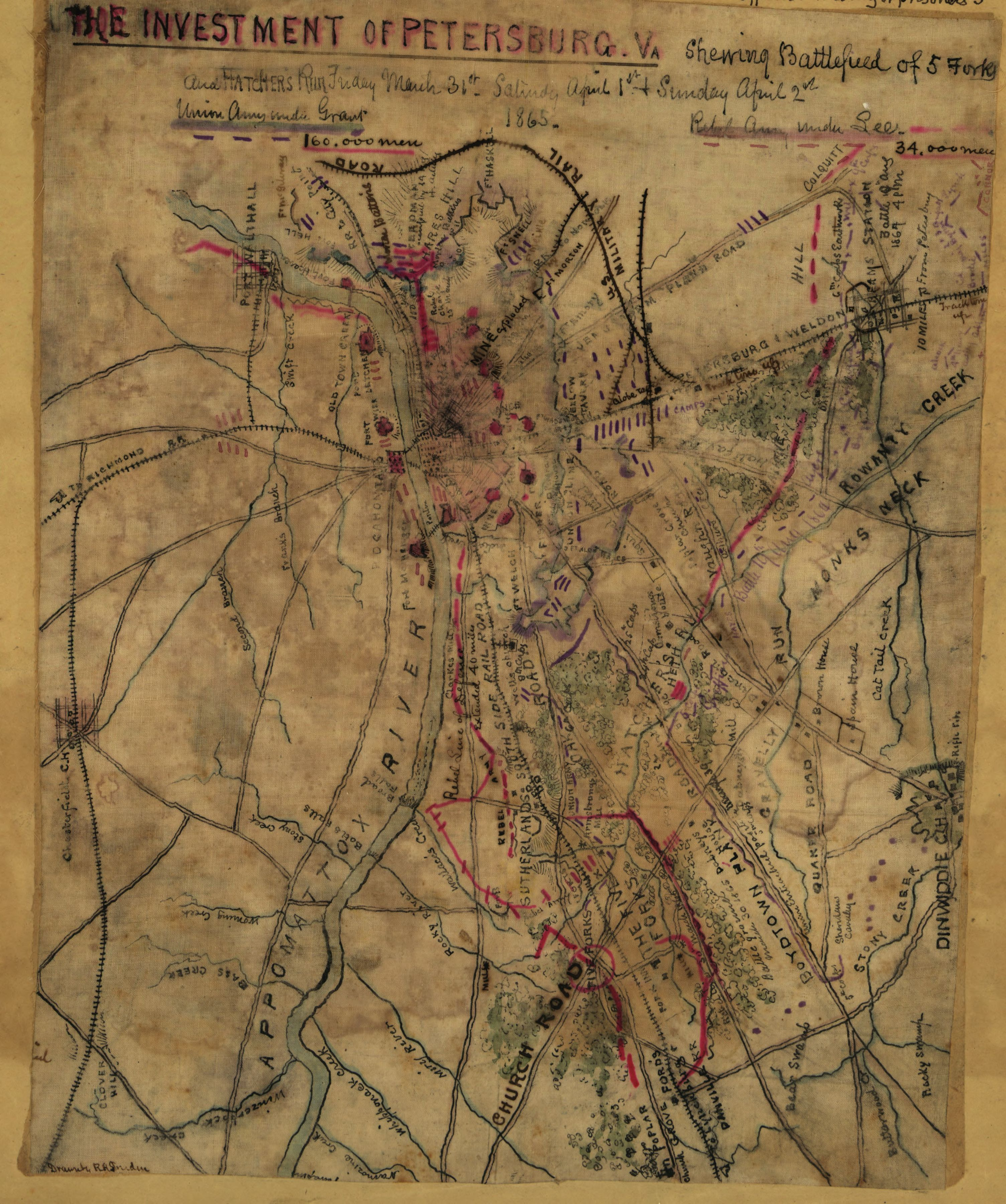
Map showing Dabney's Mill, Five Forks, Appomattox and other key Virginia battle sites during the final months of the American Civil War.

After emerging from their winter quarters at Culpeper on May 3, 1864, Sands and his fellow 88th Pennsylvanians were then assigned to Lieutenant-General Ulysses S. Grant's Overland Campaign, during which they fought in the battles of Spotsylvania Court House (on May 8 and 12), North Anna (May 23), Totopotomoy Creek (May 26), and White Oak Swamp (June 12) before engaging with other Union troops in the Siege of Petersburg, during which time Sands and his regiment charged and routed the enemy from various entrenched positions while under heavy artillery and sharpshooter fire. Afterward, they continued to support siege operations.

During the New Year, Sands was promoted again — this time to the rank of first sergeant on January 31, 1865. He was then transferred to the command staff of his regiment's G Company.

In February, he and his fellow 88th Pennsylvanians then received a new combat assignment — the Battle of Dabney's Mill/Hatcher's Run (February 6–7, 1865). And it was at this time and place that Sands performed the act of valor which resulted in his being awarded the U.S. Medal of Honor — capturing an enemy flag and carrying it from behind Confederate States Army lines to those of the Union Army. In his report to superiors on February 14, B Company Captain Aaron Bright, Jr., who had served as the acting commanding officer of the 88th Pennsylvania during the engagement, described how that day had unfolded for his regiment as it fought with other members of the Union's 2nd Brigade, 3rd Division:

We moved our camp from Jerusalem plank road on February 5, 1865, and at 6 p.m. arrived two miles to the left of Hatcher's Run; we formed line of battle and remained over night. Morning of February 6 marched at 4 o’clock, and crossed Hatcher's Run and laid in open field until 3 p.m. We recrossed Hatcher's Run, and moved in toward Dabney's Mill; formed line of battle and charged the enemy twice; gained and lost ground. We were fired into from the rear by the Sixth Army Corps. We withdrew and lay over night. Morning, February 7, moved to the right, advanced and drove the enemy out of his first line of pits; we then formed heavy skirmish line and charged the enemy's main works twice, and were repulsed each time with heavy loss to the regiment. We were then relieved by a part of Sixth Army Corps; we formed on their right and threw up works. February 8, 1865, moved out, recrossed Hatcher's Run, and lay over night. February 9, relieved the One hundred and seventh Pennsylvania Volunteers, of Third Brigade, on picket; remained on picket until 10th; we were relieved by a detachment from several regiments; we then marched to old camp on Jerusalem plank road. The officers and men behaved nobly throughout the entire move, and in one or two instances deserve special mention. First Sergt. William Sands, Company G; Color-Sergt. D. Devine, Company K, both displayed bravery unequaled throughout any engagement we were ever in.

Ordered back to camp in order to recuperate following the battle, the regiment remained in camp through March 1865 when it was assigned to the Appomattox Campaign, during which it fought in the battles of Five Forks (April 1) and Battle of Amelia Springs (April 5). During the latter engagement, which occurred just four days before the Confederate States Army's surrender at Appomattox, Sands was shot in the right thigh. Treated initially at the regimental hospital, he was transferred to the Union's Summitt House General Hospital in Philadelphia prior to being honorably discharged on a surgeon's certificate of disability on May 31, 1865.

== Post-war life ==
Following his honorable discharge from the military, Sands returned home to his wife in Berks County, Pennsylvania, and resumed his job as a painter. By 1870, he was residing in Reading's 4th Ward with his wife and mother. Although Sands and his wife, Hetty, were residents of Pen Argyl shortly after the turn of the century, Sands was making his home in Norristown by 1911, where he had found employment as an attendant at the State Hospital.

Sands died in Norristown on October 31, 1918.

== Medal of Honor citation ==
Rank and organization: First Sergeant, Company G, 88th Pennsylvania Infantry. Place and date: At Dabney's Mills, Va., 6–7 February 1865. Entered service at: Reading, Pa. Date of issue: November 9, 1893.Citation:

The President of the United States of America, in the name of Congress, takes pleasure in presenting the Medal of Honor to First Sergeant William Sands, United States Army, for extraordinary heroism on February 6–7, 1865, while serving with Company G, 88th Pennsylvania Infantry, in action at Dabney's Mills, Virginia. First Sergeant Sands grasped the enemy's colors in the face of a deadly fire and brought them inside the lines.

His medal was inscribed as follows: “Co. G, 88th Pa. Inf. Vol., Dabney Feb. 6 – 7, 1865”.

== See also ==
- Infantry Tactics
- List of American Civil War Medal of Honor recipients: Q–S
- Pennsylvania in the American Civil War
