= James G. Clark (Medal of Honor) =

- Born: October 31, 1843; Germantown, Pennsylvania
- Died: December 16, 1911 (aged 68); Pennsylvania
- Burial place: Fernwood Cemetery, Fernwood, Pennsylvania
- Military career
- Allegiance: United States of America
- Branch: United States Army; Union Army
- Rank: Private
- Unit: 88th Regiment, Pennsylvania Volunteer Infantry - Company F
- Conflicts: Second Battle of Petersburg
- Awards: Medal of Honor

Private James G. Clark (October 31, 1843 to December 16, 1911) was an American soldier who fought in the American Civil War. Clark received the country's highest award for bravery during combat, the Medal of Honor, for his action during the Second Battle of Petersburg in Virginia on 18 June 1864. He was honored with the award on 30 April 1892.

== Biography ==
Clark was born in Germantown, Pennsylvania on 31 October 1843. He enlisted in 88th Pennsylvania Infantry. He died on 16 December 1911 and his remains are interred at the Fernwood Cemetery in Pennsylvania.

== Medal of Honor citation ==
Distinguished bravery in action; was severely wounded.

== See also ==
- List of American Civil War Medal of Honor recipients: A–F
