= Charles Day (Medal of Honor) =

- Born: May 28, 1844; West Laurens, New York
- Died: June 29, 1901 (aged 57); Mansfield, Pennsylvania
- Burial place: Prospect Cemetery
- Military career
- Allegiance: United States
- Branch: United States Army; Union Army
- Rank: Private
- Unit: 210th Pennsylvania Volunteer Infantry Regiment - Company K
- Conflicts: Battle of Hatcher's Run
- Awards: Medal of Honor

Charles Day (May 28, 1844 – July 29, 1901) was an American soldier who fought in the American Civil War. Day received the country's highest award for bravery during combat, the Medal of Honor, for his action during the Battle of Hatcher's Run in Virginia on February 6, 1865. He was honored with the award on July 20, 1897.

== Biography ==
Day was born in West Laurens, New York, on May 28, 1844. He enlisted in the 210th Pennsylvania Infantry. He died on July 29, 1901, and his remains are interred at the Prospect Cemetery in Pennsylvania.

== Medal of Honor citation ==
Seized the colors of another regiment of the brigade, the regiment having been thrown into confusion and the color bearer killed, and bore said colors throughout the remainder of the engagement.

== See also ==
- List of American Civil War Medal of Honor recipients: A–F
