= Battle of Hatcher's Run =

Battle of the American Civil War

Coordinates: 37.1305°N 77.4853°W

- Part of the American Civil War
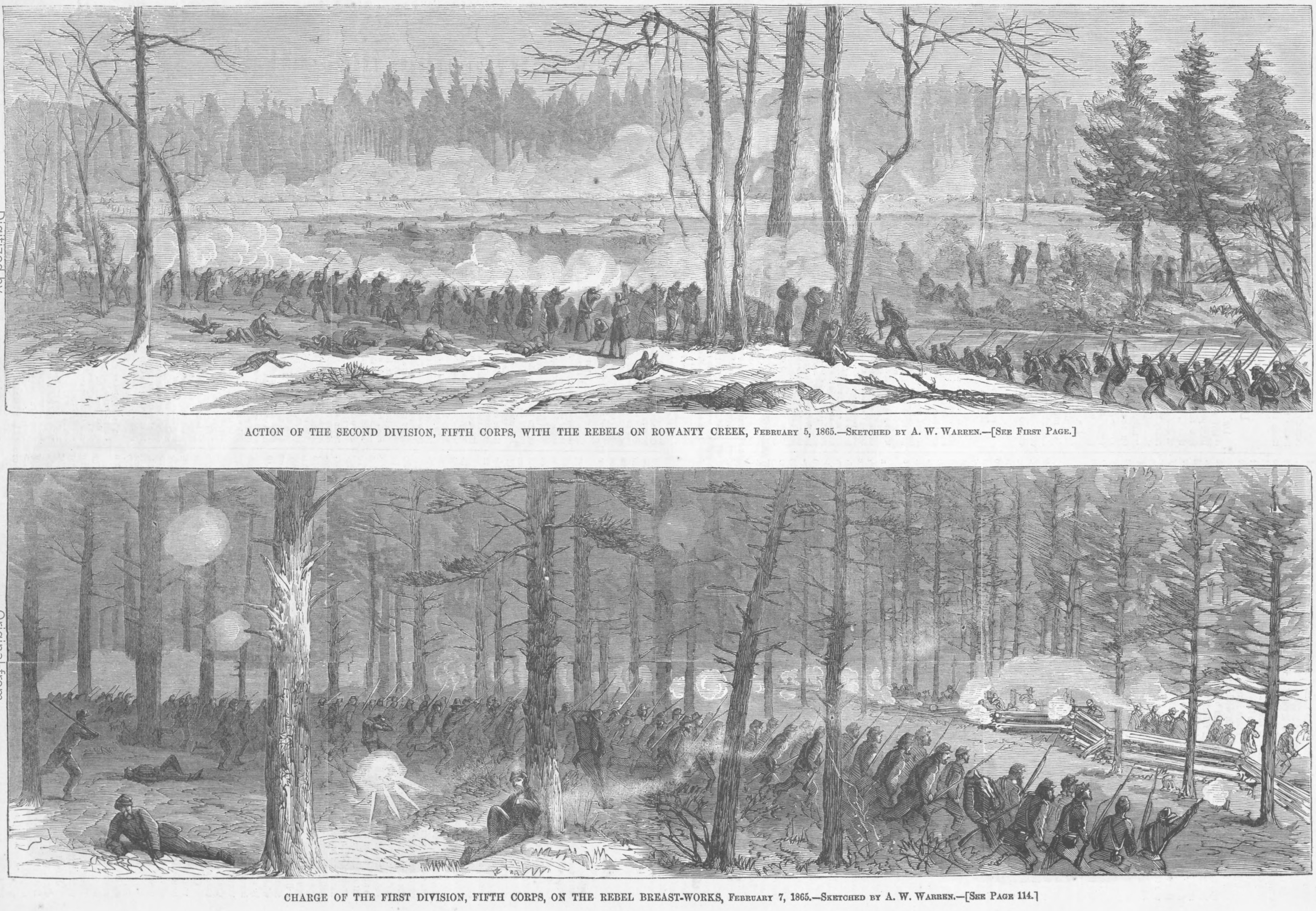
- Actions of the Fifth Corps, February 5–7, 1865
Date	February 5–7, 1865
Location	Dinwiddie County, Virginia
Result	Union victory

Belligerents
United States (Union)	(Confederate States of America) CSA (Confederacy)

Commanders and leaders
Ulysses S. Grant; George G. Meade; Andrew A. Humphreys; Gouverneur K. Warren	Ambrose P. Hill; John Brown Gordon

Strength
43,317	~14,700

Casualties and losses
1,539 total (171 killed, 1181 wounded, 187 captured)	~1,000 total

The Battle of Hatcher's Run (also known as the Battle of Dabney's Mill) took place from February 5 to 7, 1865, during the American Civil War. Fighting occurred at several locations in Dinwiddie County, Virginia, southwest of Petersburg. The battle was part of the Petersburg Campaign and constituted Union Commander-in-Chief Lt. Gen. Ulysses S. Grant's 8th Offensive. On February 5, Grant and his Army of the Potomac commander Maj. Gen. George G. Meade sent Maj. Gen. David McMurtrie Gregg’s cavalry division to disrupt a Confederate supply line along Boydton Plank Road around Dinwiddie Court House. However, Gregg discovered that the Confederates had largely abandoned the supply route. Later that day, under Gen. Robert E. Lee’s guidance, Confederate forces from Maj. Gen. John B. Gordon’s Corps and Lt. Gen. A. P. Hill’s Corps attacked one of the Union infantry forces (Maj. Gen. Andrew A. Humphreys commanding) sent to support the cavalry raid. The Federals beat back three Confederate attacks near Armstrong’s Mill. Concerned about further attacks the following day, Grant and Meade consolidated their forces around Hatcher’s Run.

On February 6, the Union launched attacks along Vaughan Road and at Dabney’s Mill. By late afternoon, the Union had cleared Vaughan Road of Confederate forces. At Dabney’s Mill, Gordon’s Confederates held up Maj. Gen Gouverneur K. Warren's Union force. During this fighting, Confederate Brig. Gen. John Pegram was killed. Late in the afternoon, Confederate reinforcements commanded by Brig. Gen. Joseph Finegan arrived and routed Warren’s Union soldiers.

The following morning (February 7), Warren sent some of his force back to the battlefield where they slowly pushed back the Confederate advanced pickets to their strengthened position at Dabney’s Mill. Late in the day, the Union soldiers charged the Rebel earthworks, which resulted in failure. When the Unionists withdrew overnight, the battle came to a close.

Although not an original aim, Grant’s offensive enabled the Union to extend its lines four miles further west. This was the last Union line extension around Petersburg before the war ended. The Battle of Hatcher’s Run was the only Civil War battle fought in Virginia during a February.

== Background ==
As 1865 dawned, Union commander-in-chief, Lt. Gen. Ulysses S. Grant had reasons for optimism. Major General William T. Sherman’s army prepared to march northward through South Carolina. Federal troops had crushed Confederate armies in Tennessee and the Shenandoah Valley. Wilmington, the last remaining Confederate Atlantic port, was cut off and would soon fall. The Confederates’ main force, commanded by Gen. Robert E. Lee, remained confined around Richmond and Petersburg. Everything had remained relatively quiet there since Grant's seventh offensive in early December, which disrupted the Weldon Railroad to Bellfield, 40 miles south of Petersburg.

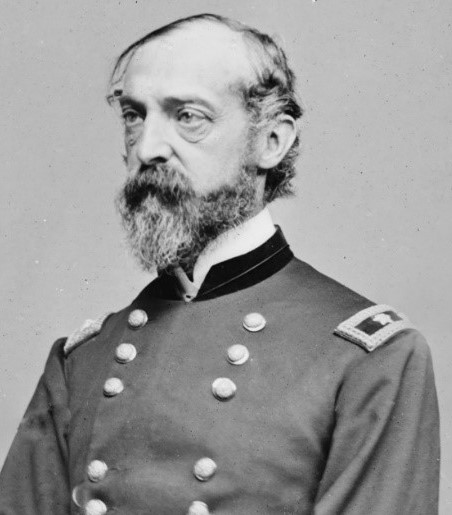
Maj. Gen. George G. Meade

On February 3, a peace conference occurred on the steamship River Queen, moored in Hampton Roads. Although cordial, the negotiations quickly collapsed. As the Confederate delegates returned to Richmond and the winter weather temporarily abated, Grant was eager for further action around Petersburg. Intelligence reached Grant that Confederate supply trains reaching Belfield were unloaded into wagons and floated up the Meherrin River and onto Petersburg via Boydton Plank Road. With this in mind, Grant developed a plan targeting the Belfield Confederate stores.

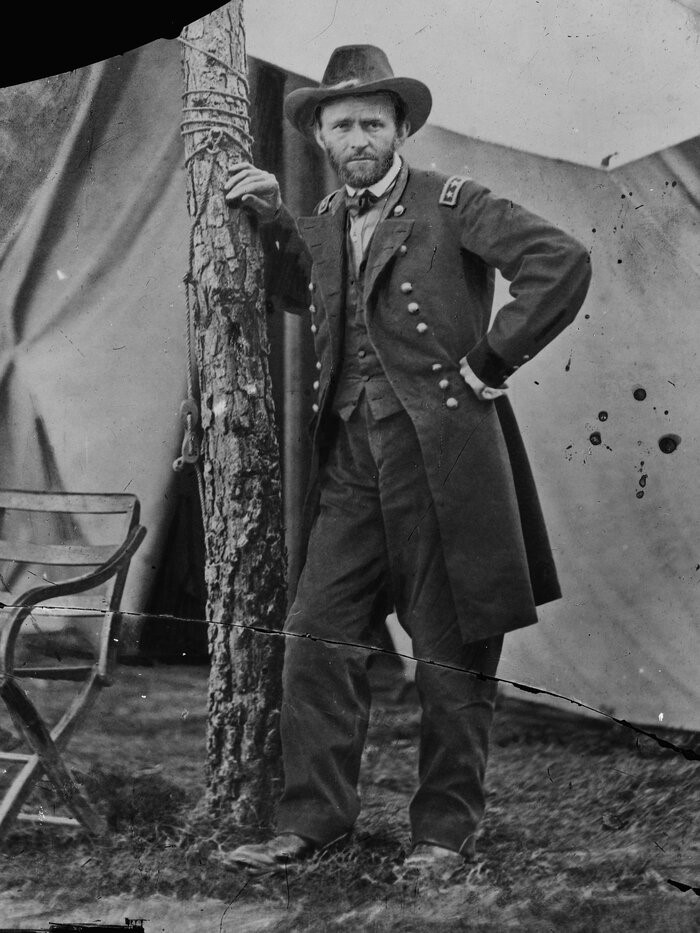
A wartime portrait of General Ulysses S Grant

Around noon on Saturday, February 4, Grant explained his idea to the Army of the Potomac commander, Maj. Gen. George G. Meade. Grant proposed sending Maj. Gen. David McM. Gregg's cavalry division on a raid to Belfield to destroy or capture as much as possible of this supply route that was supporting the Rebel war effort about Petersburg. An infantry corps would travel towards Stony Creek to support the cavalry. Grant wanted the cavalry to move out at 3:00 a.m. the next day if possible. To maximize speed, they should take no wagons, artillery, few ambulances, and minimal forage and rations. Similarly, the infantry would travel lightly, with accompanying artillery kept to no more than one battery per division.

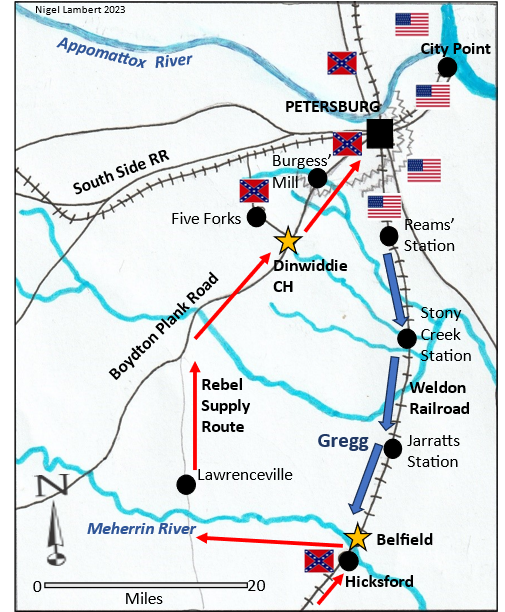
Planning Grant's 8th Petersburg Offensive

After reflection, at 4:30 p.m., Meade wrote to Grant proposing a substantive modification. Rather than sending Gregg's cavalry 40 miles south to Belfield, Meade suggested they move south for ten miles before heading west to Dinwiddie Court House on Boydton Plank Road. He reasoned they could intercept Confederate supply wagons there just as easily as at Belfield. The 5th Corps would march to the western end of Vaughan Road to support the cavalry. To cover Warren's rear, two 2nd Corps divisions (Maj. Gen. Andrew A. Humphreys commanding) would move a few miles southwest and take up positions on two Hatcher's Run crossings. Here, they would block Confederate forces in their works defending Boydton Plank Road from moving out and cutting off any Federal troops from the main Union lines.

Meade's plan retained the same objective as Grant's initial idea but involved traveling shorter distances with the three Union forces remaining closer. This reduced the chances of the Rebels isolating and attacking one of them. Furthermore, a Confederate cavalry division known to be around Belfield would have a greater distance to cover to trouble the Union forces.

Acutely aware of public backlash to failed military operations, Meade asked Grant, if the objectives of the raid were commensurate with any disappointment the public would express if the mission didn't achieve some striking result?” At 6:45 p.m., Grant replied to Meade, agreeing to all the changes, and assured him that the mission's objectives were important and that the subsequent operational reports would satisfy the public.

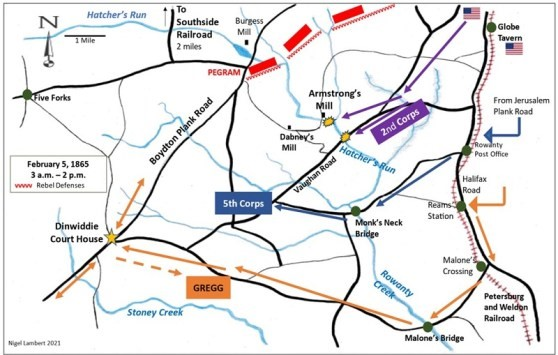
The Revised Union Plan

An hour later, Meade messaged Grant, stating that the orders had all been issued; the cavalry would move at 3:00 a.m. and the infantry at 7:00 a.m. The Union’s eighth Petersburg offensive was about to commence.

Commentators have claimed that the offensive aimed to threaten the Confederate right flank and seize the Southside Railroad, which, if accomplished, would have doomed both Petersburg and Richmond. Grant’s sixth Petersburg offensive (October 27, 1864) had this aim, but the February offensive was not a rerun of that offensive. The goal was a cavalry raid supported by infantry to disrupt an enemy supply route.

== Opposing forces ==
Order of Battle: Hatcher’s Run February 5–7, 1865

Confederate data derive from Lambert’s “Rebel Units and their Commanders at the Battle of Hatcher’s Run,” parts 1–5, The Siege of Petersburg Online (beyondthecrater.com). Confederate units from the divisions of Maj. Gen. Bryan Grimes (Second Corps) and Maj. Gen. Cadmus Wilcox (Third Corps), who may have been in support, is not listed.

Formal unit names are used. For example, John Pegram commanded “Jubal Early’s Division.” Jubal Early was not present at the battle.

It is doubtful whether any of Barringer's or Dearing's cavalry reached the battle.

Federal data derive from the “Organization of the Army of the Potomac, End of January 1865” and the official Union casualties for Hatcher's Run. Union ranks are complicated by the “brevet system.” The ranks cited are those used in the Official Records.

Officers on both sides typically took some leave during the relatively quieter winter months. Consequently, many established unit commanders were absent from the battle.

Abbreviations Used: Bvt, Brevet; w, wounded; mw, mortally wounded, k, killed; Batt, Battery; Battn, Battalion.

CSA Forces

Army of Northern Virginia – Gen. Robert E. Lee

SECOND CORPS – Maj. Gen. John B. Gordon

Early's Division – Brig. Gen. John Pegram (k 6th), Brig. Gen. William G. Lewis

Pegram's Brigade – Col. John S. Hoffman (w 6th), Lt. Col. John G. Kasey

13th VA, 31st VA, 49th VA, 52nd VA, 58th VA.

Lewis’ Brigade – Brig. Gen. William G. Lewis

6th NC, 21st NC, 54th NC, 57th NC

Johnston's Brigade – Col. John W. Lea

5th NC, 12th NC, 20th NC, 23rd NC, 1st NC Batt Sharpshooters.

Gordon's Division – Brig. Gen. Clement A. Evans

Evans’ Brigade – Col. John Baker (w 6th)

13th GA, 26th GA, 31st GA, 38th GA, 60th and 61st GA, 12th GA Battn.

Terry's Brigade – Brig. Gen. William R. Terry

2nd VA, 4th VA, 5th VA, 10th VA, 21st VA,

23rd VA, 25th VA, 27th VA, 33rd VA,

37th VA, 42nd VA, 44th VA, 48th VA.

York's Brigade – Col. William R. Peck

1st LA, 2nd LA, 5th LA, 6th LA, 7th LA, 8th LA,

9th LA, 10th LA, 14th LA, 15th LA.

Reserve Artillery: Brig. Gen. Armistead L. Long

6 Battalions: Lt. Col. Carter Baxter; Maj. Wilfred Cutshaw; Lt. Col. Robert Hardaway; Lt. Col. Marmaduke Johnson; Lt. Col. Alexander Stark and the “Lightfoot Battn.”

THIRD CORPS – Lt. Gen. A. P. Hill

Heth's Division – Maj. Gen. Henry Heth

Davis’ Brigade – Brig. Gen. Joseph R. Davis

2nd MS, 11th MS, 26th MS, 42nd MS, 1st Confed Battn.

Cookes’ Brigade – Brig. Gen. John R. Cooke

15th NC, 27th NC, 46th NC, 48th NC, 55th NC.

MacRae's Brigade – Col. John Lane or Lt. Col. James Adams

11th NC, 26th NC, 44th NC, 47th NC, 52nd NC.

McComb's Brigade – Brig. Gen. William McComb

1st TN, 7th TN, 14th TN, 17th and 23rd TN, 25th and 44th TN, 63rd TN, 2nd MD Battn.

Mahone's Division– Brig. Gen. Joseph Finegan

Weisiger Brigade – Brig. Gen. David Weisiger or Col. Virginius Groner

6th VA, 12th VA, 16th VA, 41st VA, 61st VA.

Harris Brigade – Brig. Gen. Nathaniel H. Harris

12th MS, 16th MS, 19th MS, 48th MS.

Sorrel's Brigade – Brig. Gen. G. Moxley Sorrel (w 7th)

3rd GA, 22nd GA, 48th GA, 64th GA, 2nd GA Battn., 10th GA Battn.

Finegan's Brigade – Col. David Lang

2nd FL, 5th FL, 8th FL, 9th FL, 10th FL, 11th FL.

Sanders’ Brigade – Col. William H. Forney

8th AL, 9th AL, 10th AL, 11th AL, 13th AL, 14th AL.

Artillery: Col. Reuben Walker

7 Battalions: Lt. Col. John Garnett; Maj. J. Haskell; Maj. David MacIntosh; Maj. Miller Owen; Maj. William Pegram; Maj. William Poague and Lt. Col. A. Cutts.

W.H.F. “Rooney” Lee's Cavalry Division – Maj. Gen. William H. F. “Rooney” Lee

Beale's Brigade – Brig. Gen. Richard L. Beale

9th VA, 10th VA, 13th VA.

Barringer's Brigade – Brig. Gen. Rufus C. Barringer

1st NC, 2nd NC, 3rd NC, 5th NC.

Dearing's Brigade – Brig. Gen. James Dearing

8th GA, 4th NC, 16th NC Battn., Petersburg (VA) Horse Artillery (Graham's VA Batt.).

Artillery: Maj. Roger Chew

2nd Stuart (VA) Horse Artillery, Washington (SC) Artillery.

USA Forces

Army of the Potomac – Maj. Gen. George G. Meade

II CORPS – Maj. Gen. Andrew Humphreys

First Division – Bvt. Maj. Gen. Nelson A. Miles

Fourth Brigade – Bvt. Brig. Gen. John Ramsey

4th NY Heavy Art., 64th NY, 66th NY^{15}, 53rd, PA, 116th PA, 145th PA, 148th PA.

Second Division – Brig. Gen. Thomas A. Smyth

First Brigade – Col. William A. Olmstead

19th ME, 10th MA, 19th MA, 20th MA, 7th MI, 1st MN (2 Cos), 59th NY, 152nd NY, 184th PA, 36th WI.

Second Brigade – Col. Mathew Murphy (mw 5th), Col. James P. McIvor

8th NY Heavy Art., 155th NY, 164th NY, 170th NY, 182nd NY.

Third Brigade – Lt. Col. Francis E. Pierce

14th CT, 1st DE, 12th NJ, 10th NY Battn. 108th NY, 4th OH (4 Cos), 69th PA, 106th PA (3 Cos), 7th WV (4 Cos).

Third Division – Bvt. Maj. Gen. Gershom Mott

First Brigade – Brig. Gen. P. Regis de Trobriand

20th IN, 1st ME Heavy Art., 17th ME, 40th NY, 73rd NY, 86th NY, 124th NY, 99th PA,

110th PA, 2nd US Sharpshooters.

Second Brigade – Bvt. Brig. Gen. George West

1st MA Heavy Art., 5th MI, 93rd NY, 57th PA, 105th PA, 141st PA.

Third Brigade – Bvt. Brig. Gen. Robert J. McAllister

11th Mass, 7th NJ, 8th NJ, 11th NJ, 120th NY.

Artillery: Bvt. Lt. Col. John Hazard

10th MA Lt. Art., 4th US Batt. K.

V CORPS – Maj. Gen. Gouverneur K. Warren

First Division – Bvt. Maj. Gen. Charles Griffin

First Brigade – Bvt. Brig. Gen. Horatio G. Sickel (w 6th), Col. Edwin Jenney

185th NY, 198th PA.

Second Brigade – Col. Allen L. Burr

187th NY Battn., 188th NY Battn., 189th NY.

Third Brigade – Bvt. Brig. Gen. Alfred L. Pearson

20th ME, 32nd MA, 1st MI, 16th MI, 83rd PA (6 Cos), 91st PA, 118th PA, 155th PA.

Second Division – Bvt. Maj. Gen. Romeyn B. Ayres

First Brigade – Bvt. Brig. Gen. Frederick Winthrop

5th NY, 15th NY Heavy Art., 140th NY, 146th NY.

Second Brigade – Col. Richard N. Bowerman

1st MD, 4th MD 7th MD, 8th MD.

Third Brigade – Bvt. Brig. Gen. James Gwyn

3rd DE, 4th DE, 157th PA (4 Cos) 190th PA, 191st PA, 210th PA.

Third Division – Bvt. Maj. Gen. Samuel W. Crawford

First Brigade – Brig. Gen. Edward S. Bragg

24th MI, 143rd PA, 149th PA, 150th PA, 6th WI, 7th WI.

Second Brigade – Brig. Gen. Henry Baxter

16th ME, 39th MA, 97th NY, 11th PA, 88th PA.

Third Brigade – Bvt. Brig. Gen. Henry A. Morrow (w 6th), Col. Thomas McCoy

94th NY, 95th NY, 147th NY, 56th PA, 107th PA, 121st PA, 142nd PA.

Artillery: Maj. Robert Fitzhugh

9th MA Lt. Art., 1st NY Lt. Art. Batt. D, 1st NY Lt. Art. Batt. L.

VI CORPS – Bvt. Maj. Gen. George W. Getty

First Division – Bvt. Maj. Gen. Frank Wheaton

First Brigade – Lt. Col. Edward L. Campbell

1st NJ (3 Cos), 2nd NJ (1 Co), 3rd NJ (1 Co), 4th NJ, 10th NJ, 15th NJ, 40th NJ.

Second Brigade – Col. James Hubbard

2nd CT Heavy Art., 65th NY, 121st NY, 95th PA.

Third Brigade – Bvt. Brig. Gen. Joseph E. Hamblin

37th MA, 49th PA, 82nd PA, 119th PA, 2nd RI (6 Cos), 5th WI.

IX CORPS – Bvt. Maj. Gen. John G. Parke

Third Division – Brig. Gen. John F. Hartranft.

First Brigade – Col. Charles W. Diven

200th PA, 208th PA, 209th PA.

Second Brigade – Col. Joseph A. Mathews

205th PA, 207th PA, 211th PA

Second Cavalry Division – Bvt. Maj. Gen. David McM. Gregg

First Brigade – Brig. Gen. Henry E. Davies (w 6th); Col. Hugh H. Janeway (w 6th); Col. M. Henry Avery

1st MA, 1st NJ, 10th NY, 24th NY, 1st PA (5 Cos), 2nd US Art. Batt. A.

Second Brigade – Bvt. Brig. Gen. John I. Gregg (w 6th); Col. Michael Kerwin

2nd PA, 4th PA, 8th PA, 13th PA, 16th PA, 1st US Art. Batts. H & I.

Third Brigade – Col. Oliver B. Knowles

1st ME, 2nd NY Mounted Rifles, 6th OH, 13th OH, 21st PA.

Unattached Units

MN Sharpshooters, 2nd Company. Their battle casualties are listed with Smyth's Division, II Corps.

3rd PA Cavalry Battn. – Accompanied II Corps on Feb 5; their battle casualties are listed with Smyth's Division, II Corps.

104th NY Infantry – Worked with the V Corps Provost Guard, listed in the battle casualty data.

== Battle ==
February 5, 1865

David Gregg's Cavalry Raid

Gregg's cavalry division left their camps around Fort Blaisdell at 3.00 a.m. and headed south to Malone's Crossing, before riding west to Malone's Bridge, spanning Rowanty Creek. About 30 Confederate pickets (13th Virginia Cavalry) defended the crossing. After a brief skirmish, troopers from the 13th and 2nd Pennsylvania Cavalry overwhelmed the Confederates, who fled, losing over ten men captured. Confederate cavalry commander, Maj. Gen. W. H. F. "Rooney" Lee one of Robert E. Lee's sons, was inspecting the pickets and narrowly avoided capture.

The Union cavalry continued west along difficult winter roads. They reached Dinwiddie C.H. around 1.00 p.m. to discover the Confederate supply route effectively abandoned. They patrolled up and down Boydton Plank Road but added little to their meager haul. Meade's official report claimed that the raid captured 18 wagons and 50 prisoners. Grant's intelligence had been outdated, and the offensive, as defined, was futile. Around 3.30 p.m., Gregg's cavalry headed back towards Malone's Bridge, where they would bivouac and await further orders. At 4.20 p.m., Gregg sent dispatches to Meade and Warren outlining his activities.

Warren's Activities

Warren's 5th Infantry Corps left their camps along Jerusalem Plank Road at 7.00 a.m. and headed south to Rowanty Post Office before heading west for three miles to Monk's Neck Bridge spanning Rowanty Creek. Here, Warren discovered the bridge destroyed and 100 Confederates in rifle pits defending the crossing on the opposite bank. The 190th Pennsylvania and 4th Delaware of Brig. Gen. James Gwyn’s brigade (Maj. Gen. Romeyn B. Ayres' division) was tasked with securing the crossing. The creek was deep and partially frozen over. Some soldiers felled trees across the water and carefully walked across. Where the ice was thick, soldiers could reach the opposite bank. Some soldiers attempted to swim across the frozen creek. By whatever means, sufficient Federals eventually got across the creek and overpowered the Confederates, who fled. Around 11.00 a.m., the crossing was in Union hands at a cost of eight wounded, including Maj. Daniel H. Kent, the 4th Delaware commander. The Confederates (affiliation unknown) lost 25 men captured. Both Lt. David E. Buckingham and Capt. S. Rodmond Smith of the 4th Delaware received Medals of Honor for their heroics in swimming the frozen Rowanty Creek. Warren’s engineers constructed a bridge suitable for infantry and cavalry by 12:45 p.m. However, they only completed a sturdy structure to support artillery and wagon trains by about 3:45 p.m. The 5th Corps continued marching west. As they reached Vaughan Road, they took up their agreed positions near the Hargrave house, around three miles from Dinwiddie C.H. By around 5.00 p.m., all the soldiers had reached their base, and after a march exceeding 15 miles, the 5th Corps settled down by their early-evening campfires and awaited further orders.

Humphreys’ Activities

The third Federal force in the Offensive entailed two divisions of the 2nd Infantry Corps commanded by Maj. Gen. Humphreys. They left their camps around Fort Seibert at 7.00 a.m. and reached the McDowell house on Vaughan Road within an hour. Humphreys ordered Brig. Gen. Régis de Trobriand’s brigade ( Maj. Gen. Gershom Mott’s division) to capture the Hatcher’s Run crossing of Vaughan Road two miles hence. Colonel William A. Olmstead’s brigade (Brig. Gen. Thomas Alfred Smyth’s division) was ordered to secure the Hatcher’s Run ford at Armstrong’s Mill. Confederate pickets from Brig. Gen. John Pegram’s division defended both crossings. By 10.30 a.m., the Federals had captured both strategic crossings with a loss of fewer than 20 men. During the afternoon, Humphreys’ men strengthened both crossings. They made contact with Warren's 5th Corps further down Vaughan Road. North of Armstrong's Mill, Humphreys’ men began digging in, forming a line east and west of Rocky Branch, around 1000 yards south of the main Confederate works protecting Boydton Plank Road. Humphreys discovered that he didn't have enough soldiers east of Rocky Branch to stretch from a swamp protecting the right flank to his Union soldiers west of the stream. He called up Brig. Gen. John Ramsey's brigade (from his remaining 2nd Corps division in the Petersburg trenches), who arrived just before 4.00 p.m.

The Confederate Response

Grant's Offensive had caught the Confederates off guard. Perhaps they weren't expecting an advance in the middle of winter? News of the events only reached Robert E. Lee in the late morning while attending Sunday church in Petersburg. He rushed back to his lines and met with Corps commanders Maj. Gen. John B. Gordon and Lt. Gen. A. P. Hill. They were concerned about Humphreys’ men entrenching around 1000 yards from their main works, protecting Boydton Plank Road. Something had to be done. Lee sent a brief message to Richmond outlining the situation and that he was preparing to meet the advance.

The Confederates prepared to attack the Union II Corps. East of Rocky Branch, Brig. Gen. John Rogers Cooke’s Brigade of North Carolinians, Brig. Gen. William McComb’s Brigade of mostly Tennesseans and Brig. Gen. William MacRae's Brigade of North Carolinians, all from Maj. Gen. Henry Heth’s Division (Hill's Third Corps), received orders to attack. This force comprised nearly 4,000 men. Heth's other brigade, the Mississippians, commanded by Brig. Gen. Joseph R. Davis (a further 828 men) remained in the Rebel defenses as reserves. The combative Brig. Gen. MacRae was on leave throughout the battle, a fact overlooked by some historians.

West of the stream, Brig. Gen. Clement A. Evans’s division (Gordon's Second Corps) also received orders to advance. This force (over 2,600 men) comprised three brigades: Brig. Gen. William R. Terry's Virginia Brigade, Col. William R. Peck’s Louisiana Brigade, and Col. John H. Baker's Georgia Brigade.

Soon after 4.00 p.m., the Confederates attacked. East of Rocky Branch, they drove the Union pickets back into the still-forming Federal line. Brig. Gen. Robert McAllister's brigade moved to their left to accommodate the arrival of Ramsey's brigade. However, there still were insufficient soldiers to reach Rocky Branch. Furthermore, the nascent earthworks were not long enough to accommodate all of McAllister's men. The far left regiment (8th New Jersey) was wholly exposed.

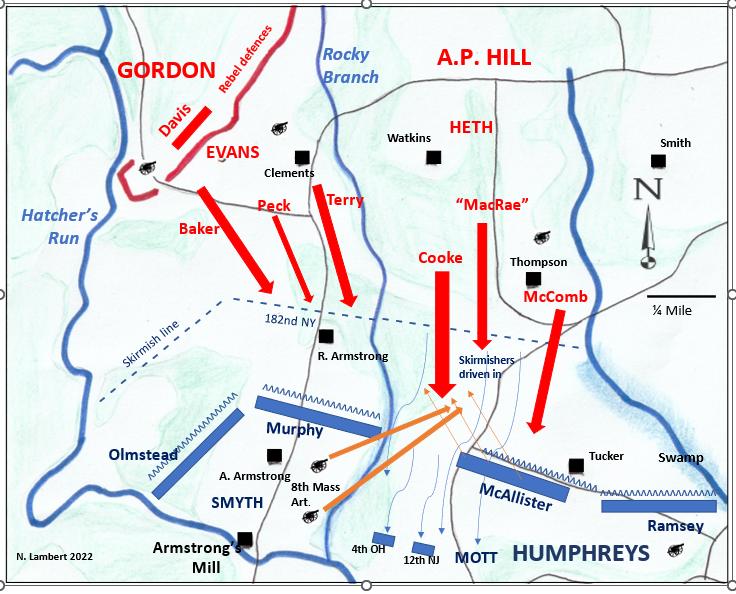
The Confederates Attack Humphreys' Line, 4.00 p.m. February 5

West of the stream, the Confederate attacks failed to penetrate the Union picket line formed by the 182nd New York Infantry Regiment. Smyth redirected his two sections of artillery (10th Massachusetts Artillery) to fire across the stream and into the Confederates, charging towards the gap in the Union line and the exposed 8th New Jersey soldiers. The enfilading cannon fire and McAllister's musketry forced the Confederates back. The Confederates charged again and met with the same fate. The exposed 8th New Jersey stood resolute. West of the stream, Evans's men again failed to break the sturdy Union picket line. However, a Confederate sharpshooter hit brigade commander Col. Mathew Murphy in the leg as he dismounted his horse. Although not considered a severe wound, it developed complications, and he died on April 16, 1865. Murphy was the most senior Union officer to die as a result of the battle.

Lee and his generals called for a third attack east of the stream. Who participated in this final assault is unclear. Many soldiers in Heth's three brigades were worn out and refused to advance again. Eyewitnesses reported that elements of Mahone's Division (which had recently arrived from Petersburg) took part in the third attack. William Mahone was on leave, and Brig. Gen. Joseph Finegan commanded the division. Another eyewitness suggested that Heth's reserve brigade, commanded by Brig. Gen. Joseph Davis also participated in the final attack. Other accounts claimed that Brig. Gen. Philip Cook's Brigade was also involved. Whichever Confederate units took part, the result was the same: the Federals beat them back. Late in the fighting, McAllister's division commander, Maj. Gen. Gershom Mott sent Brig. Gen. George West's brigade to support him. Accounts are divided as to whether these reinforcements arrived just in time to repel the third Confederate attack or whether the Confederates were already beaten before West arrived. As night descended, the battered Confederates returned to their defences.

Meade Consolidates His Forces

The Federals were jubilant at winning such a resounding victory. Praise was especially given to the two sections of artillery west of Rocky Branch and McAllister's brigade that bore the brunt of the fighting. However, Meade and Humphreys were troubled. They realized that they had had a lucky escape, and they feared that the enemy would regroup overnight and attack again in the morning. With Grant's blessing, Meade ordered Warren and Gregg to march their forces as soon as possible to the Hatcher's Run crossing of Vaughan Road. Meade also called up reinforcements to the position, namely Maj. Gen. Frank Wheaton’s division (6th Corps) and Brig. Gen. John F. Hartranft’s division (9th Corps). Overnight, these Union forces reached Humphreys’s endangered position.

February 6, 1865

Morning Activities

As dawn broke and the Union forces consolidated around Humphreys’ location, Meade felt less anxious. He ordered Warren and Humphreys to probe their fronts to discover the Confederates' whereabouts. Any Confederates found outside their works were to be driven back into their defences. No assaults on defended positions were to occur. Humphreys sent a few regiments under De Trobriand, who probed beyond the Thompson house. Upon discovering no enemy in the open, they returned and reported their findings. Meanwhile, Warren remained inactive; the orders he received were ambiguous, and he passed the morning trying to clarify what he was supposed to do.

From the Confederate side, Lee had pulled back all his forces into their trenches. He sent Mahone's Division back to Petersburg, as he constantly had to juggle his troops to cover his 30-mile line of Petersburg trenches. However, something strange was happening on the far right of the Confederate line.

Pegram Splits his Force

John Pegram's division (2,400 men) guarded the right of the Confederate trenches around the Crow house. They also blocked any Union advance to Burgess Mill on the Boydton Plank Road and beyond to the Southside Railroad. Around 11.00 a.m. Pegram went with two of his brigades (commanded by Brig. Gen. William G. Lewis and Col. John S. Hoffman) south down Quaker Road before turning left up Vaughan Road, where they joined some dismounted Confederate cavalry (commanded by Brig. Gen. Richard L. T. Beale) who had been skirmishing with Gregg's Union cavalry all morning.

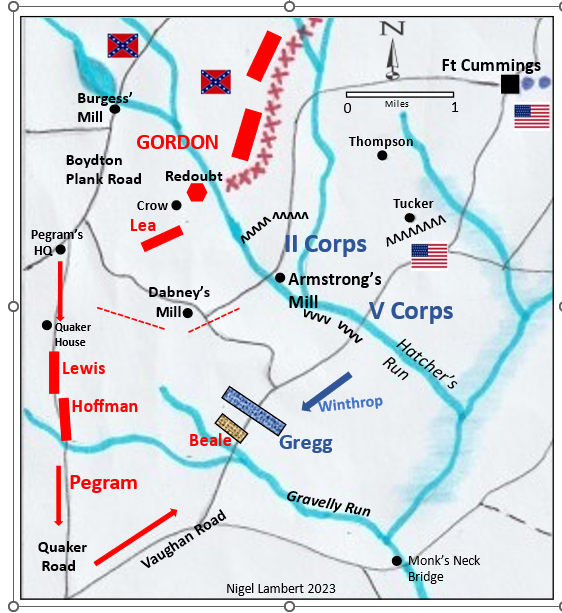
Pegram Splits His Division, 11.00 a.m., February 6

This movement left only Brig. Gen. Robert D. Johnston’s Brigade (less than 800 men) to protect the vulnerable Confederate right flank. Johnston was on leave, and Col. John W. “Gimlet” Lea commanded the brigade, a fact some authors haven't recognized. Who, if anyone, ordered Pegram to split his division is unknown. What he aimed to achieve is equally a mystery. An eyewitness recalled that Pegram had met with his corps commander, Maj. Gen. Gordon the night before, where Gordon had told him to expect a Union assault on his line in the morning.

Warren Finally Acts

Shortly after noon, Warren resolved his communication problems, and following a visit from Meade, he prepared to act. At 1.15 p.m., Warren ordered Maj. Gen. Samuel W. Crawford and Maj. Gen. Ayres to move their divisions out of the Hatcher's Run earthworks, march down Vaughan Road, turn right up the narrow Dabney's Mill Road, and head towards Dabney's Mill. He also ordered Gregg's cavalry to charge down Vaughan Road and clear it of the dismounted enemy cavalry he'd been skirmishing with all morning. This was not a “probe” as Humphreys had executed but a “reconnaissance in force.” What Warren and Meade were hoping to achieve with this action is unknown. These Union and Confederate movements meant that combat was inevitable along Vaughan Road and around Dabney's Mill.

Fighting Along Vaughan Road, 1.30 – 5.00 p.m.

As ordered, David Gregg sent two of his cavalry brigades (Brig. Gen. John Irvin Gregg and Brig. Gen. Henry Eugene Davies commanding) down Vaughan Road to push back the Confederate dismounted cavalry. They were surprised when they also encountered Pegram's two infantry brigades. The Confederates heavily defeated the Union troopers, who fled back up the road. They suffered over 100 casualties, including both brigade commanders, J. Gregg and Davies wounded. Four Federal troopers received Medals of Honor as a consequence of this fighting. The Confederates gleefully charged after the fleeing Federals. A nearby Union infantry brigade (Brig. Gen. Frederick Winthrop commanding) went to support the cavalry, and they managed to halt the Confederate advance. For the next hour, Winthrop's men tussled with Pegram's force. Pegram's larger force slowly pushed Winthrop's Federals back, and as they began to run out of ammunition, they called for support. From the Union reserves, the Brig. Gen. Horatio G. Sickels’ brigade arrived around 3.00 p.m. and not only halted Pegram’s force but routed it, sending the Confederates into the woods for cover. Pegram managed to regroup his soldiers, and at around 3.30 p.m., they headed north across difficult terrain to join their comrades around Dabney’s Mill. Elements of David Gregg’s cavalry patrolled down Vaughan Road and by 5.00 p.m. had cleared it of enemy troops, thus fulfilling their orders of nearly three hours earlier.

Fighting around Dabney’s Mill 1.30 – 5.00 p.m.

Five Union brigades (around 7,000 men) advanced along the narrow Dabney’s Mill Road towards where Gimlet Lea’s small Confederate brigade (775 men) occupied nascent earthworks around the site of Dabney’s Mill. Despite Warren’s overwhelming numerical superiority, due to the narrowness of the road and the surrounding dense woods, he could not get all his force to the front at once. The steam sawmill had long been destroyed; what remained was a massive pile of sawdust in a clearing surrounded by dense woods. Many of the soldiers remembered the sawdust pile in their memoirs, and it served as a focal point of the fighting that afternoon. As Warren’s lead regiments began to tangle with Lea’s soldiers, an early casualty was the death of "Sallie," the famed 11th Pennsylvania mascot dog, who was subsequently memorialized in bronze at Gettysburg.

Dense woods, swamps, and ravines surrounded the clearing, and the ground was slick with ice and mud, making it challenging to conduct military operations. As the Federals pushed back Lea's Confederates towards the Crow house, Rebel Corps commander Gordon eventually realized that Lea's men faced being swept away by the advancing massive blue force. Gordon sent for reinforcements from the Rebel trenches to his left. At 2.30 p.m., Evan's division (2,700) arrived and not only stopped the Federal advance but pushed them back beyond the sawdust pile. Warren got more of his men to the front (from Ayres’ division), and they once more pushed Evans and Lea back beyond the mill. The Rebels regrouped and counterattacked, sending the Federals back past the sawdust pile. At 4 p.m., Warren called for support in the form of Brig. Gen. Alfred L. Pearson’s reserve brigade. They arrived around 4.30 p.m., and went to the Union left and, with Col. Richard N. Bowerman’s brigade, prepared to attack the Rebel right held by Gimlet Lea’s men.

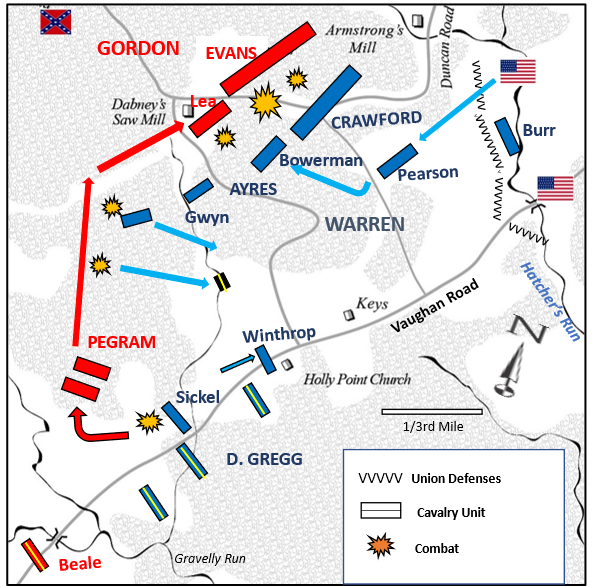
Fighting Around Dabney's Mill, 2.00-5.00 p.m., February 6.

At this exact time, Pegram and his two brigades arrived. Pearson and Bowerman attacked, and Pegram perished in a hail of bullets. The same volley seriously wounded Col. Hoffman, one of his brigade commanders. But with the arrival of two extra Confederate brigades, the Union attack failed, and the Federals retreated. Around 5.00 p.m., after three hours of constant fighting, a brief lull overcame the battlefield. The Federal line retired about 200 yards southeast of the sawdust pile and started digging in. The Confederates had much reorganizing to do. They had lost a division and brigade commander, and a gap had developed in their line. Pegram was the most senior officer killed during the Offensive. Three weeks earlier, he had married the famed Southern belle Hetty Cary.

Finegan Routs the Federals

Just after 5 p.m., with the Union troops entrenching and awaiting reinforcements marching from the South. Confederate Brig. Gen. Finegan arrived with Mahone’s division. These five veteran brigades not only resolved the gap in the Rebel line but spearheaded an all-out assault on the Union position.

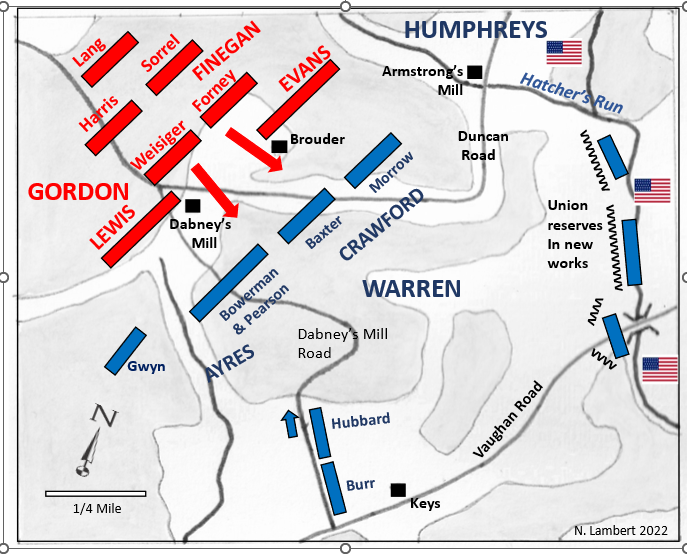
Finegan Arrives At Dabney's Mill After 5.00 p.m., February 6.

What happened next, some Federal combatants called the “great skedaddle.” The Union line first buckled and then broke; panic-stricken Federals stampeded to the rear in an embarrassing rout. The jubilant Confederates chased after them for over a mile. The bluecoats managed to reach the sanctuary of the recently created Union earthworks along Hatcher's Run. Various factors contributed to this Union debacle. Many of their soldiers were inexperienced and low on ammunition. Widespread friendly fire enhanced the panic. With night falling, the fighting fizzled out.

Overnight, a winter storm occurred with gale-force freezing winds, snow, hail, and sleet. The tired and hungry soldiers had no protective materials and limited food supplies. Many of the wounded left on the battlefield froze to death. The triumphant Confederates deployed a strong picket force and strengthened their works around the sawdust pile.

February 7, 1865

One Final Federal Assault

As dawn broke, there was little enthusiasm to continue fighting - except for Warren. Grant and Meade were concerned about the morale of Warren's men given the previous evening's “disaster,” as Meade called it. Warren suggested returning to the battlefield and pushing the strong Confederate picket line (composed of elements from Mahone's Division) back to their defenses at Dabney's Mill. Meade agreed. In mid-morning, Warren ordered Crawford's division (~4,000 men) out of their earthworks and back onto the battlefield. Amid another winter storm, they started pushing back the Confederate pickets. Progress was slow but steady, and the fighting was intense at times. Confederate Brig. Gen. G. Moxley Sorrel was seriously wounded in this fighting.

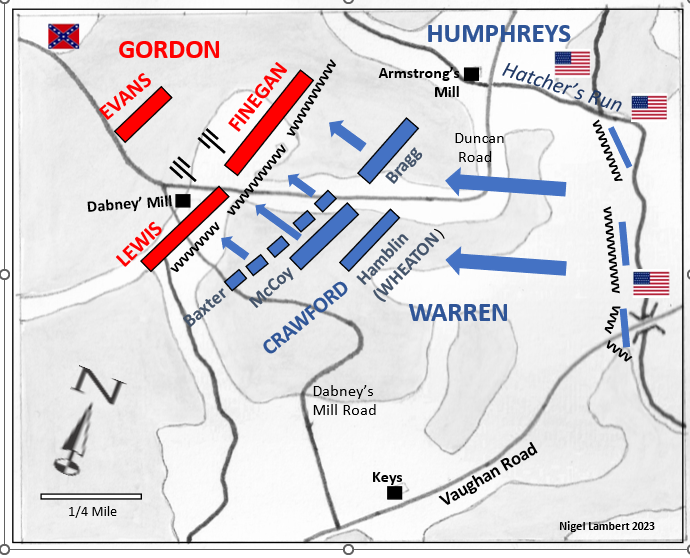
Union Final Assault Around Dabney's Mill, 6.00 p.m., February 7.

By late afternoon, Crawford had pushed the Confederate pickets back to their Dabney's Mill breastworks. Throughout the day, in consultation with Grant, Meade had repeatedly told Warren to withdraw and not to make any attacks unless “great advantages will be gained.” At Dabney's Mill, Maj. Gen. Gordon commanded the Confederate position, including three infantry divisions supported by artillery. Crawford's Federal soldiers faced this formidable line just 300 yards away. At 6.00 p.m. (in near darkness), Crawford gave the order “charge.” The Confederates soundly repelled the Union soldiers. Another Union assault produced the same result. Whether Crawford acted alone in executing this hapless assault or whether Warren ordered him to attack is unknown. In subsequent official correspondence, Warren claimed that he hadn't advised an attack, given the position's strength, nor that any such attack was ever made. This controversial Union assault is described in a 2025 article. The Federals finally withdrew to the woods for cover. Here they endured another bleak night of hunger, wet and cold, before in the early hours of February 8, they retired to the Union lines along Hatcher's Run, thus ending Grant's 8th Petersburg Offensive.

== Aftermath ==
The stated aim of Grant's Eighth Offensive was to disrupt the Confederate Belfield–Boydton Plank Road supply route. As they discovered that this route barely existed, assessing mission success is moot. However, the Union did gain most from the offensive. They captured (with ease) and held two strategic crossings of Hatcher's Run. This enabled the Federals to extend their Petersburg line four miles further west. Although not a stated aim, this represented a significant achievement and provided a launchpad for the Union's victorious Spring campaign. Importantly for Grant, it kept Lee and his army occupied; there had been no significant action around Petersburg since early December 1864. The offensive also drained the Confederates of men and encouraged others to desert.

From the Confederate perspective, they had successfully withstood yet another Union offensive around Petersburg. They maintained control of their essential Boydton Plank Road artery. They had lost two strategic Hatcher's Run crossings. Despite a slow response to the Union advance, they focused forces upon Humphreys’ 2nd Corps late on February 5, and but for poor tactics, they could have inflicted severe damage. Twenty-four hours later, they routed Warren's 5th Corps, who only escaped disaster by virtue of nearby defenses and the arrival of night. Despite losing precious officers and men and having only meager resources, the Rebels demonstrated that they were still a formidable force.

The consequences resulting from Grant's Eighth Petersburg Offensive are detailed in a 2025 article

The Battle of Hatcher's Run was the last substantial fighting around Petersburg before Lee's attempted breakout at Fort Stedman on March 25. This failed, and 15 days later, Lee surrendered after the Battle of Appomattox Court House.

Medal of Honor Recipients

Fourteen Union soldiers received the Medal of Honor for deeds performed during the Hatcher's Run battle.

David E. Buckingham, 4th Delaware. John C. Sagelhurst, 1st New Jersey Cavalry.

Abel G. Cadwallader, 1st Maryland. William Sands (soldier), 88th Pennsylvania.

Daniel G. Caldwell, 13th Pennsylvania Cavalry. Francis M. Smith, 1st Maryland.

James Coey, 147th New York. S. Rodmond Smith, 4th Delaware.

Charles Day (Medal of Honor), 210th Pennsylvania. Timothy Spillane, 16th Pennsylvania Cavalry.

John C. Delaney, 107th Pennsylvania. John Thompson (soldier, born 1838), 1st Maryland.

Jacob F. Raub, 210th Pennsylvania. John M. Vanderslice, 8th Pennsylvania Cavalry.

== Battlefield preservation ==
The Civil War Trust (a division of the American Battlefield Trust) and its partners have acquired and preserved 387 acres (1.57 km^{2}) of the battlefield in four different transactions dating back to 1990.
