= Charles Church Roberts =

American naval officer (1882–1957)

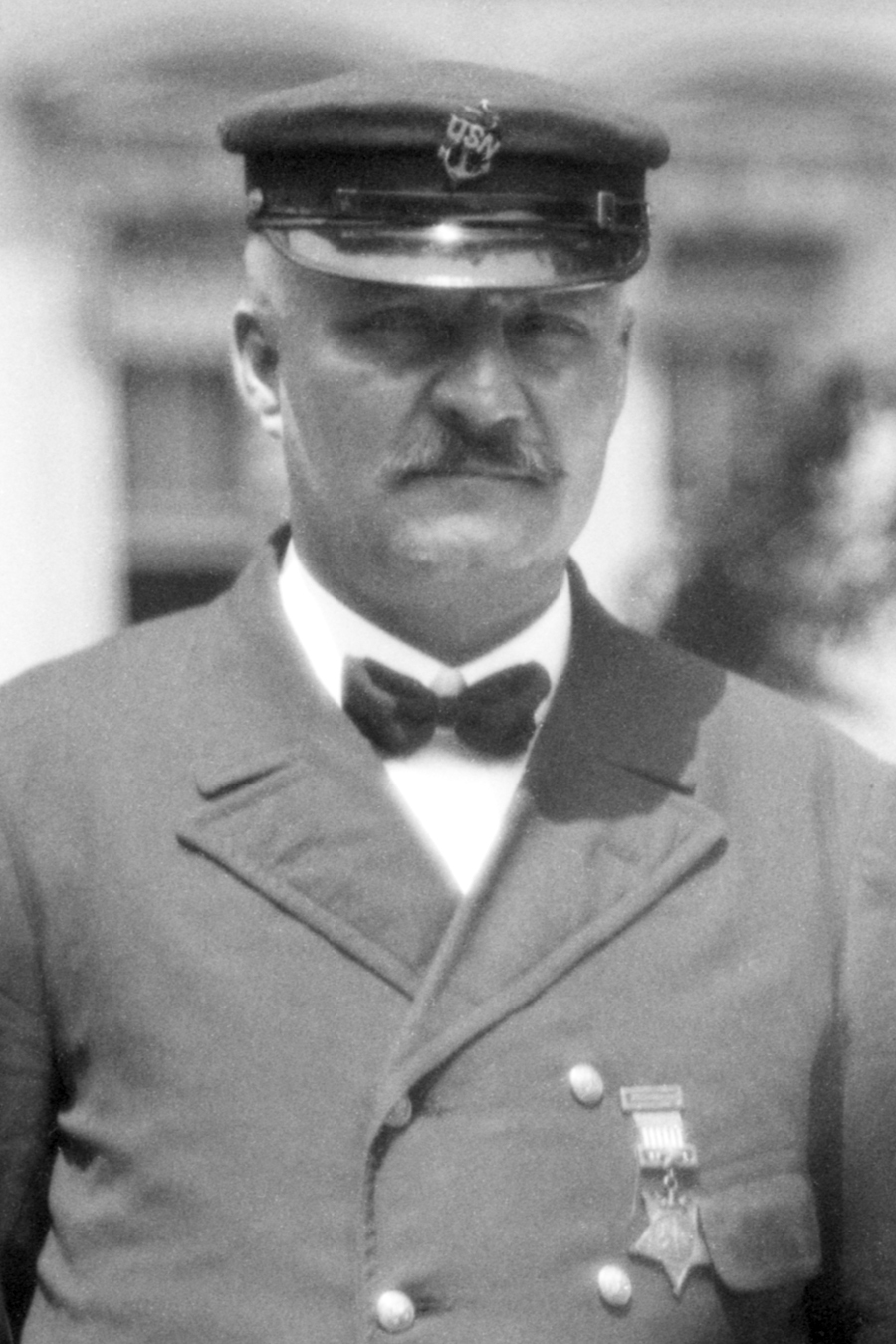
- At the White House, 13 June 1911
- Born: March 6, 1882; Newton, Massachusetts
- Died: March 8, 1957 (aged 75)
- Burial place: Prospect Hill Cemetery, Millis, Massachusetts
- Military career
- Allegiance: United States of America
- Branch: United States Navy
- Service years: c. 1904–1921
- Rank: Lieutenant (junior grade)
- Units: USS North Dakota (BB-29); USS Santee; USS Manley (DD-74); USS Melville (AD-2); USS Reid (DD-292); USS Fox (DD-234)
- Conflicts: World War I
- Awards: Medal of Honor

Charles Church Roberts (March 6, 1882 – March 8, 1957) was a United States Navy sailor and a recipient of the United States military's highest decoration, the Medal of Honor. He was awarded the medal for his actions during a fire aboard the battleship USS North Dakota in 1910. He later served in World War I and became a commissioned officer.

== Biography ==
Roberts was born on March 6, 1882, in Newton, Massachusetts. He enlisted in the U.S. Navy from Illinois in about 1904.

By September 8, 1910, he was serving as a machinist's mate first class on the battleship USS North Dakota. On that day, while North Dakota was conducting tests using oil as fuel, an explosion occurred, killing three sailors and endangering the ship. In the engine room, pieces of hot coal and coke floated in waist-high hot water, oil was aflame above one of the boilers, and the entire room was filled with smoke, steam, and fumes. Despite these dangers, Roberts and five other men of the ship's engineering department entered the engine room to haul the boiler fires and perform other tasks necessary to prevent a boiler explosion. After ensuring the safety of the ship, they then searched for and removed the bodies of the three sailors killed in the initial explosion.

For these actions, Roberts and the five other men were approved for the Medal of Honor a month later, on October 4. On 13 June 1911, President Taft presented all six heroes with their medals in a ceremony at the White House. The others were Chief Machinist's Mate Thomas Stanton, Chief Machinist's Mate Karl Westa, Chief Watertender August Holtz, Chief Watertender Patrick Reid, and Watertender Harry Lipscomb.

In 1917 during World War I, Roberts was appointed to the warrant officer rank of machinist and served on board USS Santee. He was temporarily promoted to the commissioned officer rank of lieutenant (junior grade) in March 1918 and received orders to the destroyer USS Manley and then to USS Melville. In November 1919 he was temporarily assigned to the destroyer USS Reid, then fitting out at Squantum, Massachusetts, and later transferred to USS Fox. He resigned his commission in June 1921.

Roberts died on March 8, 1957, two days after his 75th birthday, and was buried at Prospect Hill Cemetery in Millis, Massachusetts.

== Medal of Honor citation ==
Roberts's official Medal of Honor citation reads:

Serving on board the U.S.S. North Dakota; for extraordinary heroism in the line of his profession during the fire on board that vessel, 8 September 1910.

== See also ==
- List of Medal of Honor recipients during peacetime
