= John E. Jones =

John E. Jones may refer to:

- John E. Jones (Medal of Honor) (1834–?), American Civil War recipient of the Medal of Honor
- John E. Jones III (born 1955), U.S. federal judge for the Middle District of Pennsylvania
- John Edward Jones (sculptor) (1806–1862), Irish sculptor
- John Edward Jones (Welsh politician) (1905–1970), Welsh political organiser
- John Edward Jones (governor) (1840–1896), Welsh-born governor of Nevada
- John Edward Jones (1983–2009), caver who died in the Nutty Putty Cave
- John Elfed Jones (born 1933), Welsh businessman and language activist
