= William Newland =

William Newland may refer to:

- William C. Newland (1860–1938), Lieutenant Governor of North Carolina
- William D. Newland (1841–1914), United States Navy sailor and Medal of Honor recipient
- William R. Newland (1919–1998), New Zealand-British studio potter
- William Newland (MP) (c. 1685–1738), British lawyer and politician
