= Harry Lipscomb =

US Navy sailor and Medal of Honor recipient (1879–1926)

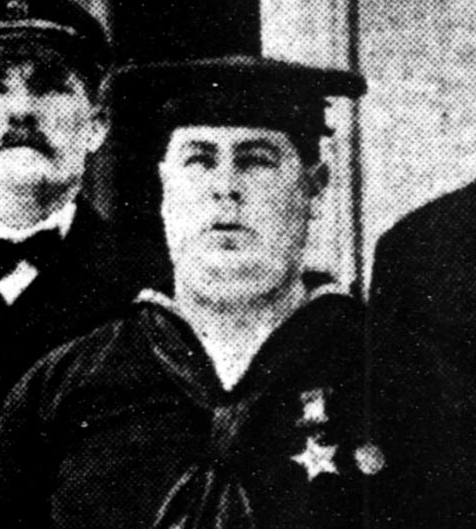
- Lipscomb after being presented with the Medal of Honor at the White House in 1911
- Born: April 2, 1878; Washington, D.C.
- Died: September 7, 1926 (aged 48)
- Burial place: Arlington National Cemetery
- Military career
- Allegiance: United States
- Branch: United States Navy
- Rank: Chief Watertender
- Unit: USS North Dakota (BB-29)
- Awards: Medal of Honor

Harry Lipscomb (April 2, 1878 – September 7, 1926) was a United States Navy sailor and a recipient of the United States military's highest decoration, the Medal of Honor.

== Biography ==
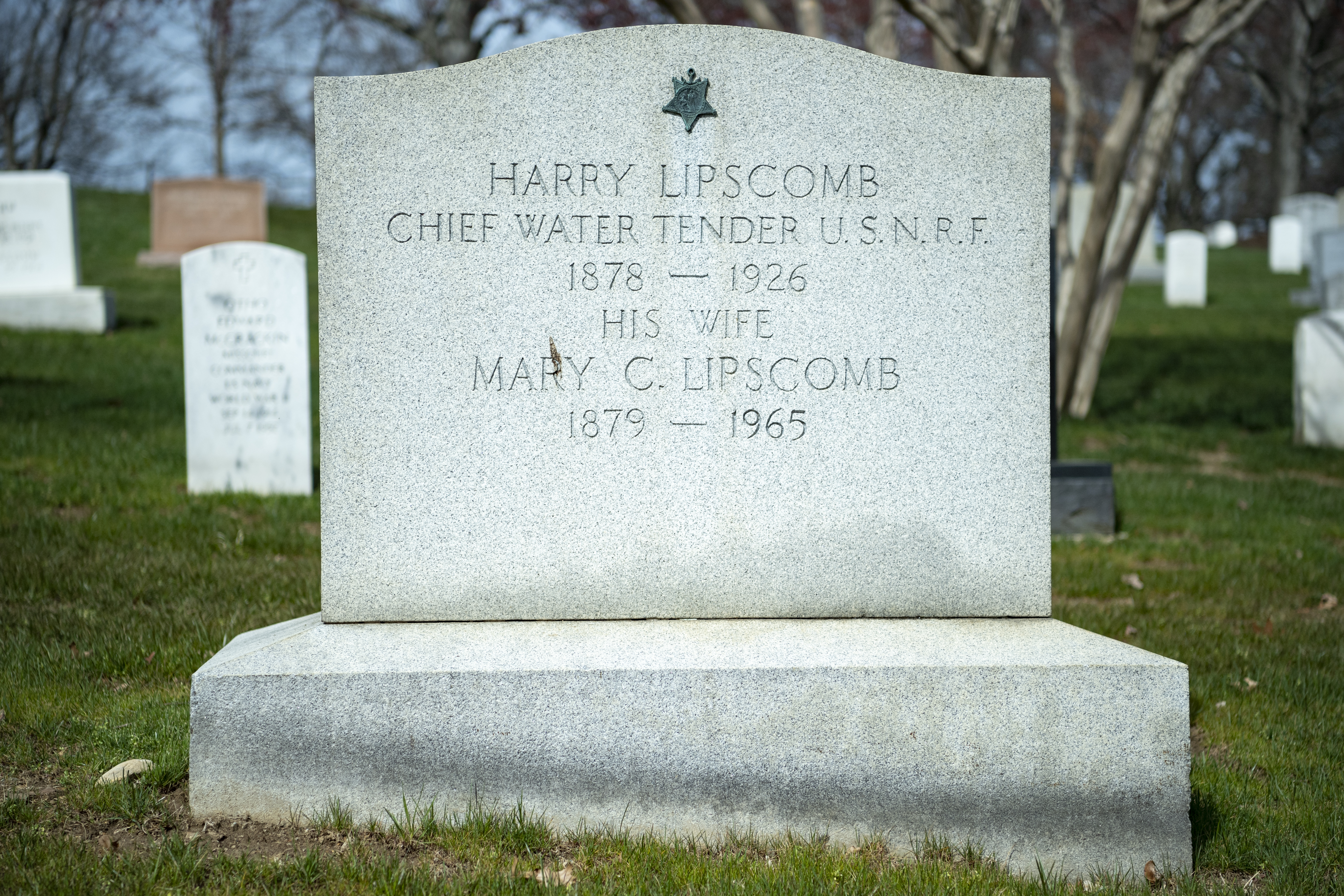
Grave at Arlington National Cemetery

Lipscomb was born on April 2, 1878, in Washington, D.C. He enlisted in the Navy from that city in around 1900 and by September 8, 1910, was serving as a watertender on the USS North Dakota (BB-29). On that day, while the North Dakota was conducting tests using oil as fuel, an explosion occurred, killing three sailors and endangering the ship. In the engine room, pieces of hot coal and coke floated in waist-high hot water, oil was aflame above one of the boilers, and the entire room was filled with smoke, steam, and fumes. Despite these dangers, Lipscomb and five other men of the ship's engineering department entered the engine room to haul the boiler fires and perform other tasks necessary to prevent a boiler explosion. After ensuring the safety of the ship, they then searched for and removed the bodies of the three sailors killed in the initial explosion.

For these actions, Lipscomb and the five other men were awarded the Medal of Honor a month later, on October 4. The others were Chief Machinist's Mate Thomas Stanton, Chief Machinist's Mate Karl Westa, Chief Watertender August Holtz, Chief Watertender Patrick Reid, and Machinist's Mate First Class Charles C. Roberts.

Lipscomb reached the rank of chief watertender before leaving the Navy. He died at age 48 and was buried at Arlington National Cemetery, in Arlington, Virginia.

== Medal of Honor citation ==
Lipscomb's official Medal of Honor citation reads:

On board the U.S.S. North Dakota, for extraordinary heroism in the line of his profession during the fire on board that vessel, 8 September 1910.

== See also ==
- List of Medal of Honor recipients in non-combat incidents
