= James Sheridan (Medal of Honor) =

United States Navy sailor and Medal of Honor recipient

- Born: May 27, 1830; Drogheda, County Louth, Ireland
- Died: November 9, 1893 (aged 63)
- Burial place: Holy Cross Cemetery, Brooklyn, New York City
- Military career
- Allegiance: United States
- Branch: United States Navy
- Rank: Quartermaster
- Unit: USS Oneida (1861) from 1862 - 1865
- Conflicts: American Civil War • Battle of Forts Jackson and St. Philip • Battle of Mobile Bay
- Awards: Medal of Honor

James Sheridan (May 27, 1830 – November 9, 1893) was a Union Navy sailor in the American Civil War and a recipient of the U.S. military's highest decoration, the Medal of Honor, for his actions at the Battle of Mobile Bay. [Battle of Forts Jackson and St. Philip]

Born on May 27, 1830, in Drogheda, Ireland, a "rope maker", he arrived from Ireland on the Ellen Austin in 1857 at Castle Gardens in lower Manhattan (NYC), NY. His initial enlistment was 23 October 1858 where Sheridan lied about his birth in Newark, New Jersey for reasons unknown, but presumably for higher enlistment bonus or rank / pay grade. Sheridan was living in New York when he joined the Navy the second time after the outbreak of the Civil War. He was a skilled navigator and served during the war as a quartermaster (master of the aft quarterdeck) on the USS Oneida.

At the Battle of Mobile Bay on August 5, 1864, he was captain of Oneida's aft 11-inch gun as the ship took heavy fire from Fort Morgan's Confederate artillery . A shell fragment struck the carriage of his gun and another Confederate shot decapitated a U.S. Marine before denting and cracking the gun itself, Sheridan was wounded in 22 locations. An 1873 account recalled that Sheridan "was badly wounded by the splinters and by pieces of the man's head striking him in various parts of the body, bespattering him with blood and brains." A button from the marine's cap hit him in the chest but was prevented from causing injury by a watch which Sheridan kept in his breast pocket for use in navigation. Despite his wounds, Sheridan oversaw the firing of two more shots from his damaged gun and then took over for the injured signal quartermaster. For these actions, he was awarded the Medal of Honor four months later on December 31, 1864, however his medal remained unclaimed and in the possession of the Department of the Navy as of 1898.

Sheridan's official Medal of Honor citation reads:

Served as quartermaster on board the U.S.S. Oneida in the engagement at Mobile Bay 5 August 1864. Acting as captain of the after 11-inch gun, and wounded in several places, Sheridan remained at his gun until the firing had ceased and then took the place of the signal quartermaster who had been injured by a fall. Recommended for his gallantry and intelligence, Sheridan served courageously throughout this battle which resulted in the capture of the rebel ram Tennessee and the damaging of Fort Morgan.

Sheridan died on November 9, 1893, at age 63 and was buried in Brooklyn, New York City.
