= Thomas Kendrick (Medal of Honor) =

- Born: 1839; Bath, Maine
- Died: Unknown
- Military career
- Allegiance: United States
- Branch: United States Navy
- Rank: Coxswain
- Unit: USS Oneida
- Conflicts: American Civil War • Battle of Mobile Bay
- Awards: Medal of Honor

Thomas Kendrick (born 1839, date of death unknown) was a Union Navy sailor in the American Civil War and a recipient of the U.S. military's highest decoration, the Medal of Honor, for his actions at the Battle of Mobile Bay.

Born in 1839 in Bath, Maine, Kendrick was still living in that city when he joined the Navy. He served during the Civil War as a coxswain on the USS Bienville. He volunteered to join the USS Oneida for the Battle of Mobile Bay on August 5, 1864, during which he showed "courageous devotion to duty". For this action, he was awarded the Medal of Honor four months later, on December 31, 1864.

Kendrick's official Medal of Honor citation reads:

Served as coxswain on board the U.S.S. Oneida in the engagement at Mobile Bay, 5 August 1864. Volunteering for the Mobile Bay action from Bienville, Kendrick displayed courageous devotion to duty, and his excellent conduct throughout the battle which resulted in the capture of the rebel ram Tennessee and in the damaging of Fort Morgan, attracted the attention of the commanding officer and those serving around him.
