= David J. Naylor =

- Born: David Johnson Naylor; November 14, 1843; Thompsonville, Connecticut
- Died: February 7, 1926 (aged 82)
- Burial place: River Bend Cemetery, Westerly, Rhode Island
- Military career
- Allegiance: United States
- Branch: United States Navy
- Rank: Landsman
- Unit: (United States Navy) USS Oneida
- Conflicts: American Civil War • Battle of Mobile Bay
- Awards: Medal of Honor

David Johnson Naylor (November 14, 1843 – February 7, 1926) was a Union Navy sailor in the American Civil War and a recipient of the U.S. military's highest decoration, the Medal of Honor, for his actions at the Battle of Mobile Bay.

== Biography ==
Naylor was born on November 14, 1843, in Thompsonville, Connecticut. Naylor was still living in that state when he joined the Navy. He served during the Civil War as a landsman on the USS Oneida. At the Battle of Mobile Bay on August 5, 1864, he supplied gunpowder to one of his ship's Parrott rifles as a powder boy. When his passing box, used to protect the powder as it was being carried, was shot from his hands and fell overboard into a small boat of the USS Galena, Naylor retrieved the box and resumed his duties. For this action, he was awarded the Medal of Honor four months later, on December 31, 1864.

Naylor's official Medal of Honor citation reads:

Served on board the U.S.S. Oneida in the engagement at Mobile Bay, 5 August 1864. Acting as powder boy at the 30-pounder Parrott rifle, Naylor had his passing box shot from his hands and knocked overboard where it fell in one of the Galena's boats which was under the bow. Jumping overboard, Naylor recovered his box, returned to his station and continued to carry out his courageous actions throughout the engagement which resulted in the capture of the rebel ram Tennessee and the damaging of Fort Morgan.

After the war, Naylor settled in the Potter Hill section of Hopkinton, Rhode Island where he was employed as a mill worker.

Naylor died on February 7, 1926, at age 82 and was buried at River Bend Cemetery in Westerly, Rhode Island.
