= USS North Dakota (BB-29) =

Dreadnought battleship of the United States Navy

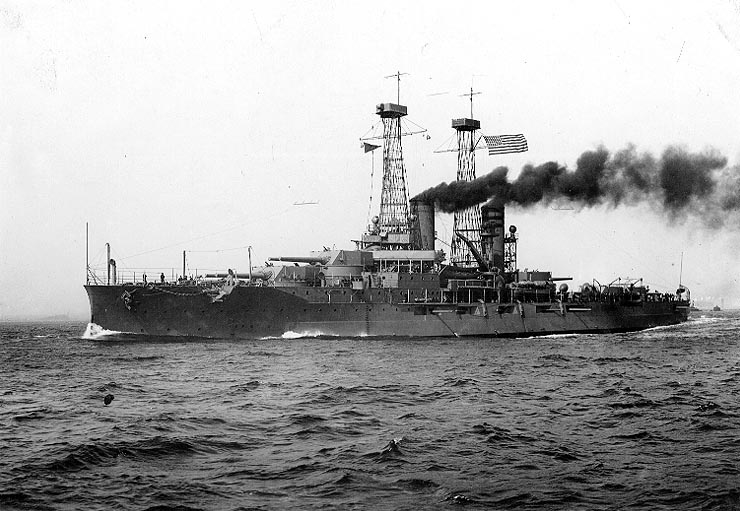
- North Dakota underway, circa 1912

History

United States
- Name: North Dakota
- Namesake: North Dakota
- Builder: Fore River Shipyard
- Laid down: 16 December 1907
- Launched: 10 November 1908
- Commissioned: 11 April 1910
- Decommissioned: 22 November 1923
- Stricken: 7 January 1931
- Fate: Broken up, 1931

General characteristics
- Class & type: Delaware-class battleship
- Displacement: Normal: 20,380 long tons (20,707 t); Full load: 22,400 long tons (22,759 t)
- Length: 518 ft 9 in (158 m) (overall); 510 ft (155 m) (waterline)
- Beam: 85 ft 3 in (26 m)
- Draft: 27 ft 3 in (8 m) (mean); 28 ft 10 in (9 m) (max)
- Installed power: 14 × Babcock & Wilcox water-tube boilers; 25,000 shp (18,642 kW)
- Propulsion: 2 × Curtis steam turbines; 2 × screw propellers
- Speed: 21 kn (24 mph; 39 km/h)
- Range: 6,500 nmi (12,000 km; 7,500 mi) @ 12 kn (14 mph; 22 km/h)
- Crew: 933 officers and men
- Armament: 10 × 12 in (305 mm)/45 caliber Mark 5 guns; 14 × 5 in (127 mm)/50 cal Mark 6 guns; 2 × 3-pounder 47 mm (1.85 in)/40 cal guns; 4 × 1-pounder 37 mm (1.46 in) guns; 2 × 21 in (533 mm) torpedo tubes (submerged)
- Armor: Belt: 9–11 in (229–279 mm); Lower casemate: 8–10 in (203–254 mm); Upper casemate: 5 in (127 mm); Barbettes: 4–10 in (102–254 mm); Turret face: 12 in (305 mm); Conning tower: 11.5 in (292 mm); Decks: 2 in (51 mm)

USS North Dakota (BB-29) was a dreadnought battleship of the United States Navy, the second member of the Delaware class, her only sister ship being Delaware. North Dakota was laid down at the Fore River Shipyard in December 1907, was launched in November 1908, and commissioned into the US Navy in April 1910. She was armed with a main battery of ten 12-inch (305 mm) guns and was capable of a top speed of 21 kn (24 mph; 39 km/h). North Dakota was the first vessel of the US Navy to be named after the 39th state.

North Dakota had a peaceful career; she was present during the United States occupation of Veracruz in 1914, but did not see action. After the United States entered World War I in April 1917, North Dakota remained in the US, training crewmen for the rapidly expanding wartime Navy, and therefore did not see combat. She remained on active duty through the early 1920s, until she was decommissioned under the terms of the Washington Naval Treaty in November 1923, and converted into a radio-controlled target ship. She served in that capacity until 1930, when she was replaced in that role by Utah. In 1931, she was sold for scrapping and thereafter dismantled.

== Design ==
Line-drawing of North Dakota

The two Delaware-class battleships were ordered in response to the British battleship HMS Dreadnought, the first all-big-gun battleship to enter service. The previous American dreadnoughts, the South Carolina class, had been designed before the particulars of HMS Dreadnought were known. The Navy decided that another pair of battleships should be built to counter the perceived superiority of Dreadnought over South Carolina, and so Rear Admiral Washington L. Capps prepared a design for a ship with an additional main battery gun turret to match Dreadnought's ten guns. But unlike Dreadnought, all ten of North Dakota's guns could fire on the broadside. At the time of her construction, North Dakota was the largest and most powerful battleship then being built in the world.

North Dakota was 518 ft 9 in (158 m) long overall and had a beam of 85 ft 3 in (26 m) and a draft of 27 ft 3 in (8 m). She displaced 20,380 long tons (20,707 t) as designed and up to 22,400 long tons (22,759 t) at full load. The ship was powered by two-shaft Curtis steam turbines and fourteen coal-fired Babcock & Wilcox boilers, generating a top speed of 21 knots. The ship had a cruising range of 6,500 nautical miles (12,000 km; 7,500 mi) at a speed of 12 kn (14 mph; 22 km/h). She had a crew of 933 officers and men. Her bow had an early example of bulbous forefoot.

The ship was armed with a main battery of ten 12-inch (305 mm)/45 (Note: /45 refers to the length of the gun in terms of calibers. A /45 gun is 45 times long as it is in bore diameter.) Mark 5 guns in five twin Mark 7 gun turrets on the centerline, two of which were placed in a superfiring pair forward. The other three turrets were placed aft of the superstructure. The secondary battery consisted of twenty-one 5-inch (127 mm)/50 Mark 6 guns mounted on Mark 9 and Mark 12 pedestal mounts in casemates along the side of the hull. As was standard for capital ships of the period, she carried a pair of 21-inch (533 mm) torpedo tubes, submerged in her hull on the broadside.

North Dakota's main armored belt was 11 in (279 mm) thick, while the armored deck was 2 in (51 mm) thick. The gun turrets had 12 in (305 mm) thick faces and the conning tower had 11.5 in (292 mm) thick sides.

== Service history ==
=== Construction – 1917 ===
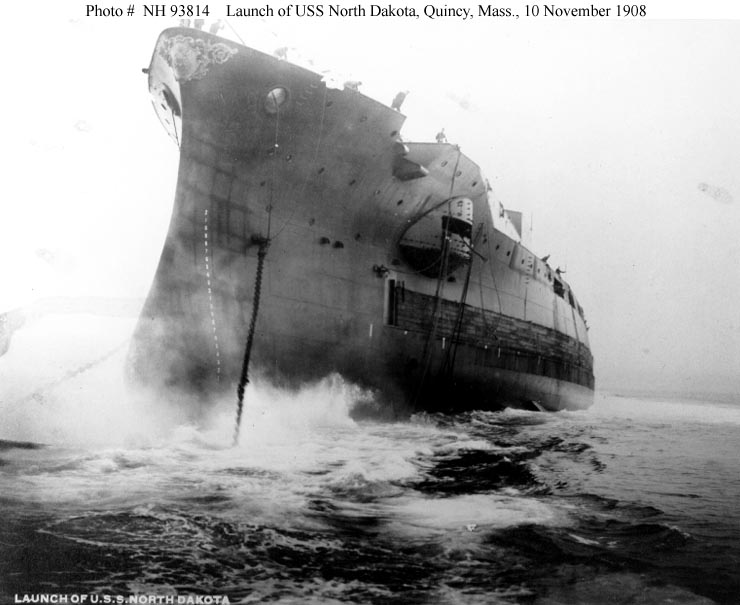
North Dakota at her launching

The keel for North Dakota was laid down at the Fore River Shipyard in Quincy, Massachusetts, on 16 December 1907. She was launched on 10 November 1908, and completed on 11 April 1910, thereafter being commissioned into the fleet. On 8 September 1910, the ship suffered an oil-tank explosion and fire while at sea. Six men—Chief Watertenders August Holtz and Patrick Reid, Chief Machinist's Mates Thomas Stanton and Karl Westa, Machinist's Mate First Class Charles C. Roberts, and Watertender Harry Lipscomb—each received the Medal of Honor "for extraordinary heroism in the line of his profession" during the fire.

After her commissioning, North Dakota was assigned to the Atlantic Fleet; she participated in the normal peacetime routine of training cruises, fleet maneuvers, and gunnery drills in the Atlantic and in the Caribbean Sea. On 2 November 1910, she crossed the Atlantic for the first time, on a good-will visit to Britain and France. Fleet maneuvers followed in the Caribbean the next spring. Midshipmen training cruises for cadets from the Naval Academy occupied North Dakota's time in the summers of 1912 and 1913. On 1 January 1913, she joined the honor escort for the British armored cruiser HMS Natal, which was carrying the remains of Whitelaw Reid, the United States Ambassador to Great Britain.

The United States remained neutral when war in Europe broke out in August 1914; in the Americas, political disturbances in Mexico during that country's revolution kept the US Navy occupied that year. North Dakota steamed off Veracruz, where she arrived on 26 April 1914, five days after American sailors had occupied the city. She cruised the coast of Mexico to protect Americans in the country until October, when she returned to Norfolk, Virginia, arriving on 16 October. As war loomed, the Atlantic Fleet began intensive training to prepare for a possible American entrance into the conflict.

=== World War I ===
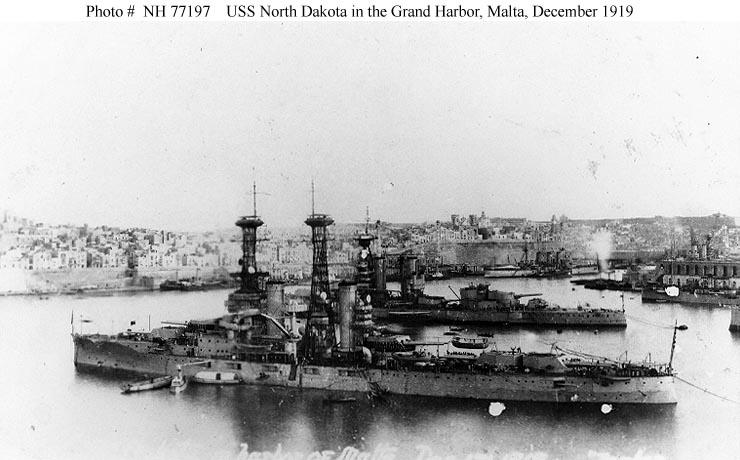
North Dakota in Malta in 1919

North Dakota was conducting gunnery training in Chesapeake Bay when the United States declared war on Germany on 6 April 1917. Unlike her sister Delaware, North Dakota remained in American waters for the duration of the war, and did not see action. She was based out of York River, Virginia and New York City, and was tasked with training gunners and engine room personnel for the rapidly expanding wartime fleet. Admiral Hugh Rodman requested that North Dakota remain behind because he did not trust the reliability of her engines. In 1917, her engines were replaced with new geared turbines, and new fire control equipment was installed.

On 13 November 1919, North Dakota left Norfolk, carrying the remains of the Italian Ambassador to the United States, Vincenzo Macchi di Cellere, who had died 20 October in Washington, D.C. The ship stopped in Athens, Constantinople, Valencia, and Gibraltar while cruising the Mediterranean Sea. She thereafter returned to the United States, and participated in fleet maneuvers in the Caribbean in the spring of 1920. In July 1921, she was present during the joint Army-Navy bombing tests, where the ex-German battleship SMS Ostfriesland and cruiser SMS Frankfurt were sunk in an air-power demonstration. North Dakota returned to the normal peacetime routine of training exercises, including two midshipmen cruises in the summers of 1922 and 1923; the latter cruise went to European waters, where she visited Spain, Scotland, and Scandinavia.

In the years immediately following the end of the war, the United States, Britain, and Japan all launched huge naval construction programs. All three countries decided that a new naval arms race would be ill-advised, and so convened the Washington Naval Conference to discuss arms limitations, which produced the Washington Naval Treaty, signed in February 1922. Under the terms of Article II of the treaty, North Dakota and her sister Delaware were to be scrapped as soon as the new battleships Colorado and West Virginia, then under construction, were ready to join the fleet. (Note: Washington Naval Treaty, Chapter I: Article II.) North Dakota was decommissioned on 22 November 1923 in Norfolk in accordance with the terms of the treaty. She was disarmed and reclassified as an "unclassified" ship on 29 May 1924, and thereafter converted into a radio-controlled gunnery target ship. Her turbines were removed for later use aboard the battleship Nevada when she was modernized in the 1930s. She served in that capacity until 1930, when she was replaced by the battleship Utah. She was stricken from the Naval Vessel Register on 7 January 1931 and sold to the Union Shipbuilding Company of Baltimore on 16 March 1931 for dismantling. She was towed from the Norfolk Navy Yard on 27 March 1931 by the company's steamer Columbine to the ship breaking yard in Baltimore.
