= Charles B. Woram =

United States Medal of Honor recipient

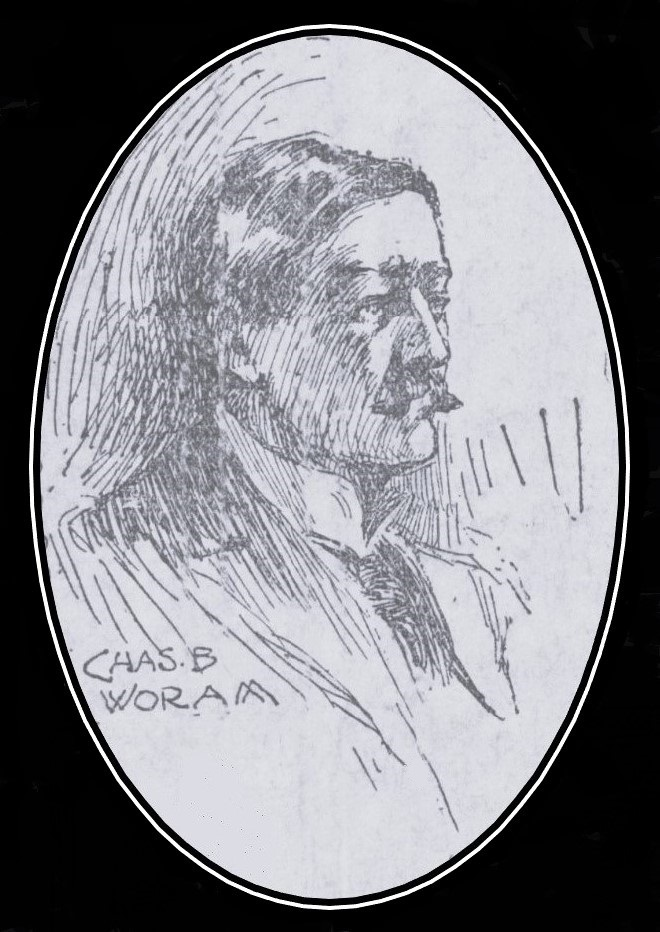
- Charles B. Woram cameo sketch portrait from his Nov 5, 1897 obituary in the New York Journal newspaper, page 5
- Born: March 29, 1845; New York City
- Died: November 1, 1897 (aged 52); Manhattan, New York City
- Burial place: Woodlawn Cemetery (Bronx, New York)
- Military career
- Allegiance: United States
- Branch: United States Navy
- Rank: Seaman
- Unit: USS Oneida
- Conflicts: American Civil War: Battle of Mobile Bay
- Awards: Medal of Honor

Charles Bromley Woram (March 29, 1845 – November 1, 1897) was a Union Navy sailor in the American Civil War and a recipient of the U.S. military's highest decoration, the Medal of Honor, for his actions at the Battle of Mobile Bay.

== Biography ==
Born on March 29, 1845, in New York City, Woram shifted from merchant shipping to the Navy to serve in the Civil War. He was the son of a merchant and was well educated. He served during the Civil War as a seaman on the USS Oneida. At the Battle of Mobile Bay on August 5, 1864, he showed "cool courage" while carrying orders for the ship's executive officer. For this action, he was awarded the Medal of Honor four months later, on December 31, 1864. He was discharged from the New York City Police Department on September 1, 1897, after serving since 1873.

In 1983, Woram was involved in a scandal in which his wife Hilah was tried for abduction and aiding in the sexual assault of her daughter Eliza Josephine. Hilah wanted her underage daughter to marry the clerk Henry Bentley when the two took Eliza sometime in February and Hilah allegedly forced her daughter to have relations with Bently. Charles Woram was informed by his daughter three months later leading to her transfer to the Gerry Society.

Now under arrest, Hilah and Bentley were put on trial. Bentley confessed to the assault and placed the date of the incident as February 26. Hilah was retried due to the disagreement and dismissal of the jury. The retrial also failed. Hilah believed her sister to be behind it as revenge after being spurned by Charles after his marriage to Hilah in 1876. Released from custody in October 1893, Hilah was soon in court again in May 1894 for making threats towards her now married daughter. After the surrender of Bentley on November 15, 1894, Eliza retracted all charges saying they were fabricated with aid from her aunt and uncle Thorpe and William Cambell.

Woram died on November 1, 1897, at age 52 and was buried in Section A, Range 95, Grave 23 of Woodlawn Cemetery (Bronx, New York).

== Citation ==
Woram's official Medal of Honor citation reads:

Served on board the U.S.S. Oneida in the engagement at Mobile Bay, 5 August 1864. Acting as an aid to the executive officer, Woram carried orders intelligently and correctly, distinguishing himself by his cool courage throughout the battle which resulted in the capture of the rebel ram Tennessee and the damaging of Fort Morgan.
