= Karl Westa =

US Navy sailor and Medal of Honor recipient (1875–1949)

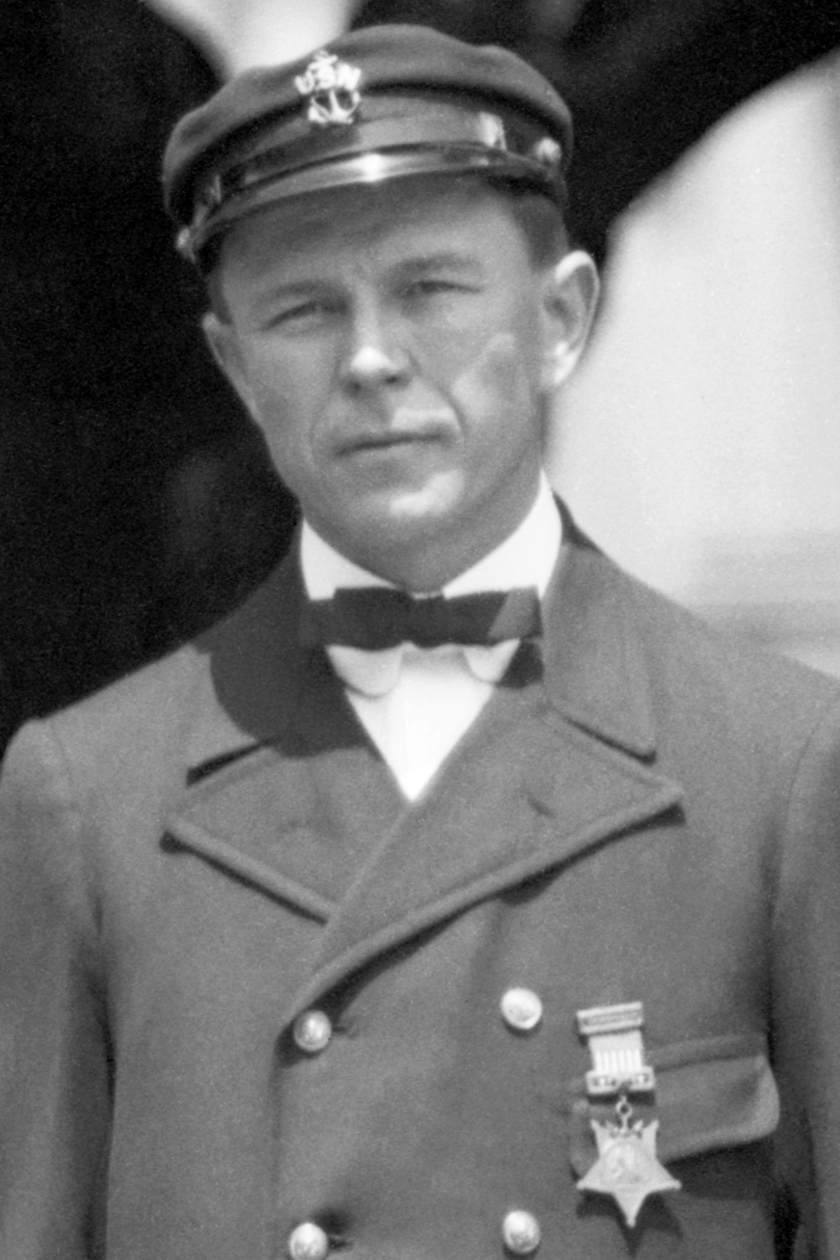
- At the White House, June 13, 1911
- Born: April 8, 1875; Norway
- Died: March 3, 1949 (aged 73)
- Burial place: Arlington National Cemetery
- Military career
- Allegiance: United States of America
- Branch: United States Navy
- Rank: Chief Machinist's Mate
- Unit: USS North Dakota (BB-29)
- Awards: Medal of Honor

Karl Westa (April 8, 1875 – March 3, 1949) was a United States Navy sailor and a recipient of the United States military's highest decoration, the Medal of Honor.

== Biography ==
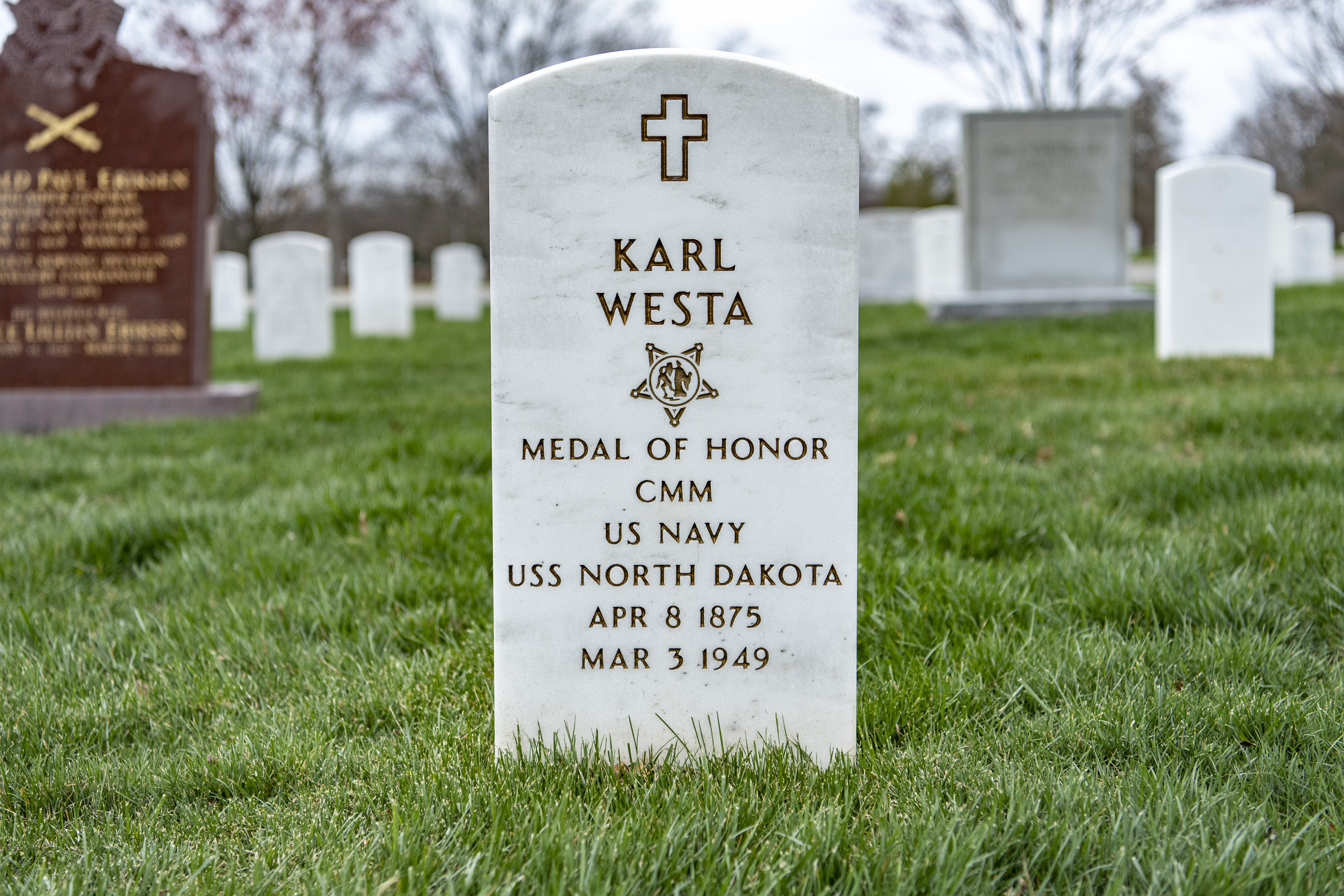
Grave at Arlington National Cemetery

Karl Westa was born in Norway and immigrated to the United States. He departed on board the Danish vessel SS Hellig Olav from the port of Kristiansand and arrived in New York City on September 5, 1905.

Westa joined the United States Navy from New York and by September 8, 1910, was serving as a chief machinist's mate on the USS North Dakota (BB-29). On that day, while the North Dakota was conducting tests using oil as fuel, an explosion occurred, killing three sailors and endangering the ship. In the engine room, pieces of hot coal and coke floated in waist-high hot water, oil was aflame above one of the boilers, and the entire room was filled with smoke, steam, and fumes. Despite these dangers, Westa and five other men of the ship's engineering department entered the engine room to haul the boiler fires and perform other tasks necessary to prevent a boiler explosion. After ensuring the safety of the ship, they then searched for and removed the bodies of the three sailors killed in the initial explosion.

For these actions, Westa and the five other men were awarded the Medal of Honor a month later, on October 4. The others were Chief Machinist's Mate Thomas Stanton, Chief Watertender August Holtz, Chief Watertender Patrick Reid, Machinist's Mate First Class Charles C. Roberts, and Watertender Harry Lipscomb.

Westa left the Navy while still a chief machinist's mate. He died at age 73 and was buried at Arlington National Cemetery, Arlington County, Virginia.

== Medal of Honor citation ==
Westa's official Medal of Honor citation reads:

On board the U.S.S. North Dakota, for extraordinary heroism in the line of his profession during the fire on board that vessel, 8 September 1910.

== See also ==
- List of Medal of Honor recipients
- List of Medal of Honor recipients in non-combat incidents
