= August Holtz =

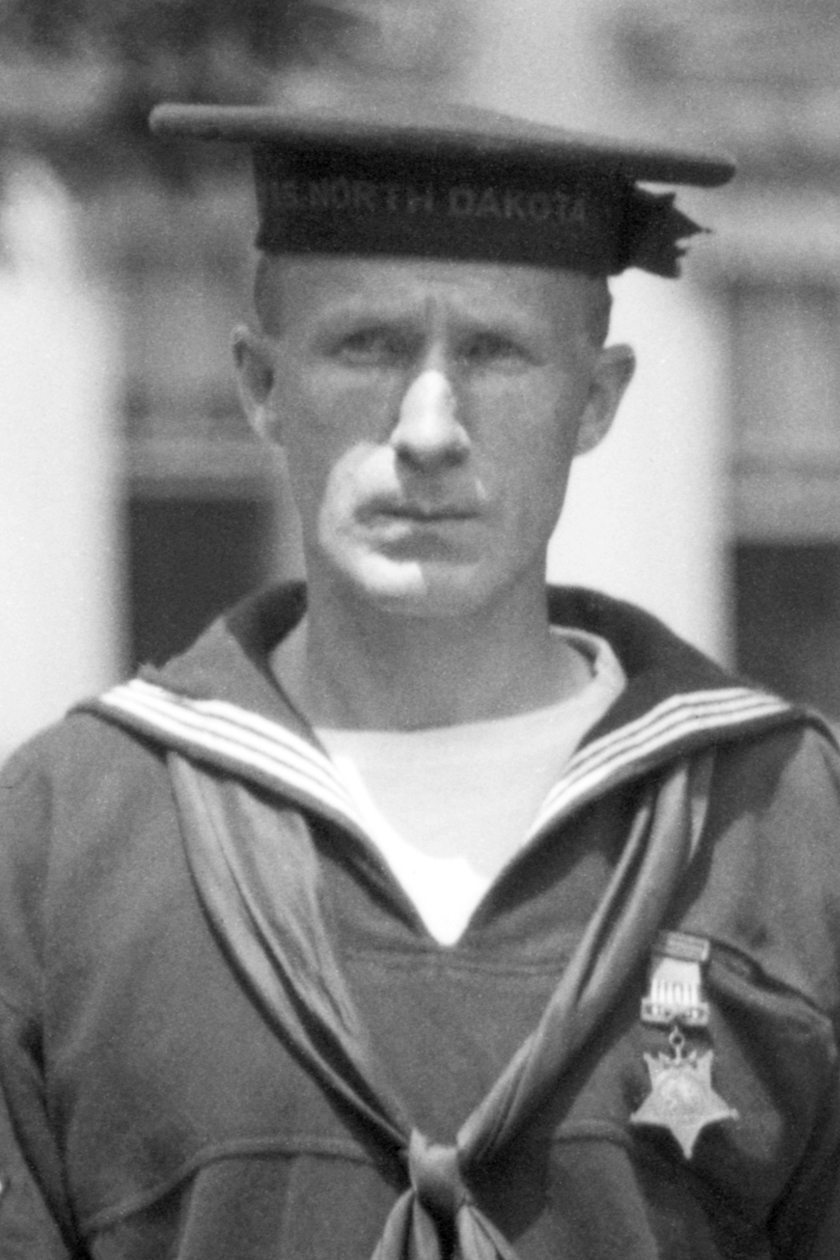
- At the White House, 13 June 1911
- Born: February 12, 1871; St. Louis, Missouri, US
- Died: March 5, 1938 (aged 67)
- Burial place: Long Island National Cemetery
- Military career
- Allegiance: United States
- Branch: United States Navy
- Service years: 1891–1911
- Rank: Chief Watertender
- Unit: USS North Dakota (BB-29)
- Awards: Medal of Honor

August Holtz (February 12, 1871 – March 5, 1938) was a United States Navy sailor and a recipient of the United States military's highest decoration, the Medal of Honor.

== Biography ==
Holtz was born on February 12, 1871, in St. Louis, Missouri and joined the Navy in 1891. By September 8, 1910, he was serving as chief watertender on the USS North Dakota (BB-29). On that day, while the North Dakota was conducting tests using oil as fuel, an explosion occurred, killing three sailors and endangering the ship. In the engine room, pieces of hot coal and coke floated in waist-high hot water, oil was aflame above one of the boilers, and the entire room was filled with smoke, steam, and fumes. Despite these dangers, Holtz and five other men of the ship's engineering department entered the engine room to stifle the boiler fires and perform other tasks necessary to prevent a boiler explosion. After ensuring the safety of the ship, they then searched for and removed the bodies of the three sailors killed in the initial explosion.

For these actions, Holtz and the five other men were approved for the Medal of Honor a month later, on October 4. On 13 June 1911, President Taft presented all six heroes with their medal in a ceremony at the White House. The others were Chief Machinist's Mate Thomas Stanton, Chief Machinist's Mate Karl Westa, Chief Watertender Patrick Reid, Machinist's Mate First Class Charles C. Roberts, and Watertender Harry Lipscomb. Holtz left the Navy the same year.

Holtz died at age 67.

== Medal of Honor citation ==
Holtz's official Medal of Honor citation reads:

On board the U.S.S. North Dakota, for extraordinary heroism in the line of his profession during the fire on board that vessel, 8 September 1910.

== See also ==
- List of Medal of Honor recipients in non-combat incidents
