= Patrick Reid (Medal of Honor) =

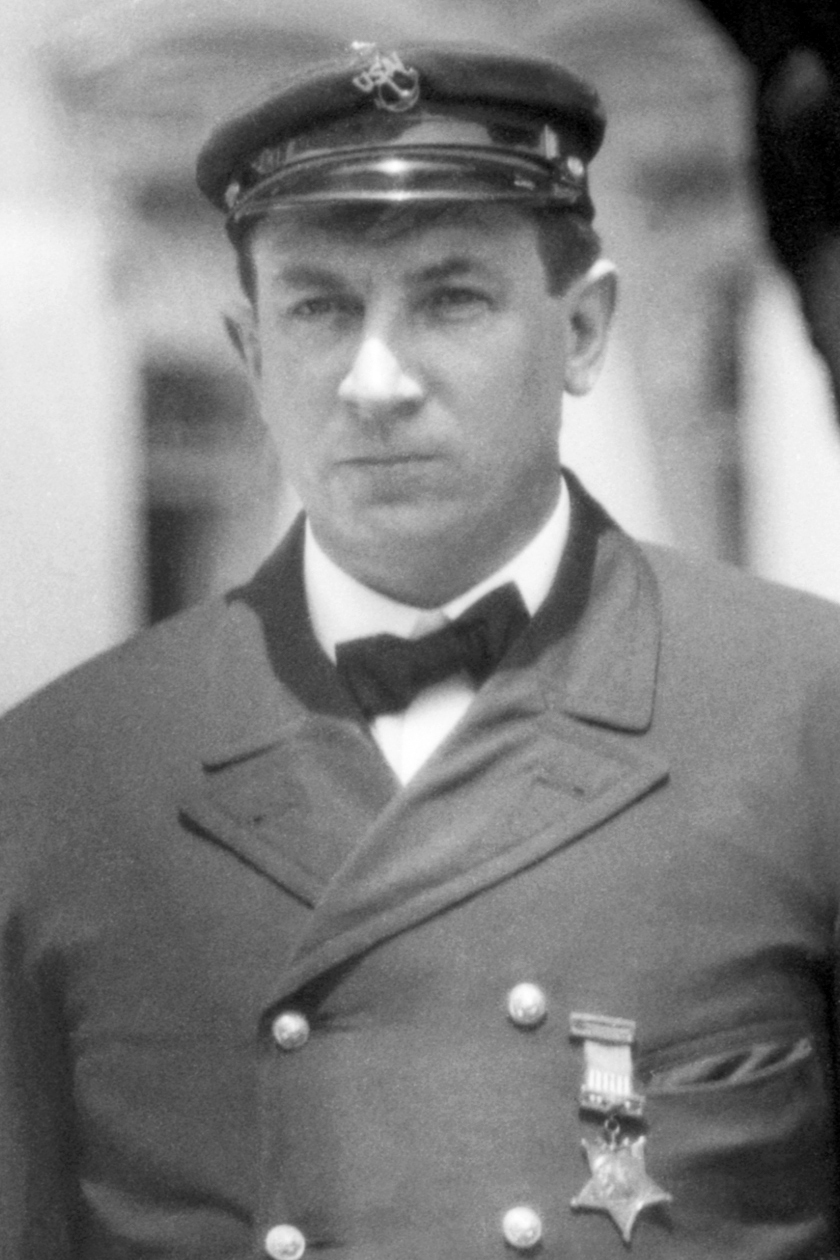
- At the White House, June 13, 1911
- Born: June 17, 1875; Dublin, Ireland
- Died: October 23, 1924; Manhattan, New York
- Burial place: St. John Cemetery, Queens, New York
- Military career
- Allegiance: United States of America
- Branch: United States Navy
- Service years: 1895–1915
- Rank: Chief Watertender
- Unit: USS North Dakota (BB-29)
- Awards: Medal of Honor

Patrick Reid (June 17, 1875 – October 23, 1924) was a United States Navy sailor and a recipient of the United States military's highest decoration, the Medal of Honor.

== Biography ==
Reid was born on June 17, 1875, in Dublin, Ireland. He joined the U.S. Navy from New York in 1895 and by September 8, 1910, was serving as a chief watertender on the USS North Dakota (BB-29). On that day, while the North Dakota was conducting tests using oil as fuel, an explosion occurred, killing three sailors and endangering the ship. In the engine room, pieces of hot coal and coke floated in waist-high hot water, oil was aflame above one of the boilers, and the entire room was filled with smoke, steam, and fumes. Despite these dangers, Reid and five other men of the ship's engineering department entered the engine room to haul the boiler fires and perform other tasks necessary to prevent a boiler explosion. After ensuring the safety of the ship, they then searched for and removed the bodies of the three sailors killed in the initial explosion.

For these actions, Reid and the five other men were awarded the Medal of Honor a month later, on October 4. The others were Chief Machinist's Mate Thomas Stanton, Chief Machinist's Mate Karl Westa, Chief Watertender August Holtz, Machinist's Mate First Class Charles C. Roberts, and Watertender Harry Lipscomb.

== Medal of Honor citation ==
Reid's official Medal of Honor citation reads:

For extraordinary heroism in the line of his profession during the fire on board the U.S.S. North Dakota where Reid was serving, 8 September 1910.

== See also ==
- List of Medal of Honor recipients during peacetime
