= James S. Roantree =

American Marine

- Born: c. 1835; Kildare, Ireland
- Died: 1873 (aged 37–38)
- Burial place: Mount Calvary Cemetery, Roslindale, Massachusetts
- Military career
- Allegiance: United States of America; Union
- Branch: United States Marine Corps
- Service years: 1858 - 1870
- Rank: Sergeant
- Unit: (United States Navy) USS Agawam
- Conflicts: American Civil War
- Awards: Medal of Honor

James S. Roantree (c. 1835 – February 24, 1873) was a sergeant serving in the United States Marine Corps during the American Civil War who received the Medal of Honor for bravery.

== Biography ==
Roantree was born in about 1835 in Leixlip Kildare, Ireland. After immigrating to the United States, he enlisted in the Marine Corps from Brooklyn on January 15, 1858. He was assigned to the Marine Detachment aboard the USS Oneida (1861) when it was sent to fight in the American Civil War during the Battle of Mobile Bay. He was discharged in December 1870.

Roantree died on February 24, 1873, and was buried at Mount Calvary Cemetery in Roslindale, Massachusetts.

== Medal of Honor citation ==
Rank and organization: Sergeant, U.S. Marine Corps. Born: 1835, Dublin, Ireland. Accredited to: New York. G.O. No.: 45, 31 December 1864.

Citation:

On board the U.S.S. Oneida during action against rebel forts and gunboats and with the ram Tennessee in Mobile Bay, 5 August 1864. Despite damage to his ship and the loss of several men on board as enemy fire raked her decks and penetrated her boilers, Sgt. Roantree performed his duties with skill and courage throughout the furious battle which resulted in the surrender of the rebel ram Tennessee and in the damaging and destruction of batteries at Fort Morgan.

== See also ==
- List of American Civil War Medal of Honor recipients: Q–S
