= Prospect Hill Cemetery (Millis, Massachusetts) =

Historic cemetery in Massachusetts, United States

- U.S. National Register of Historic Places
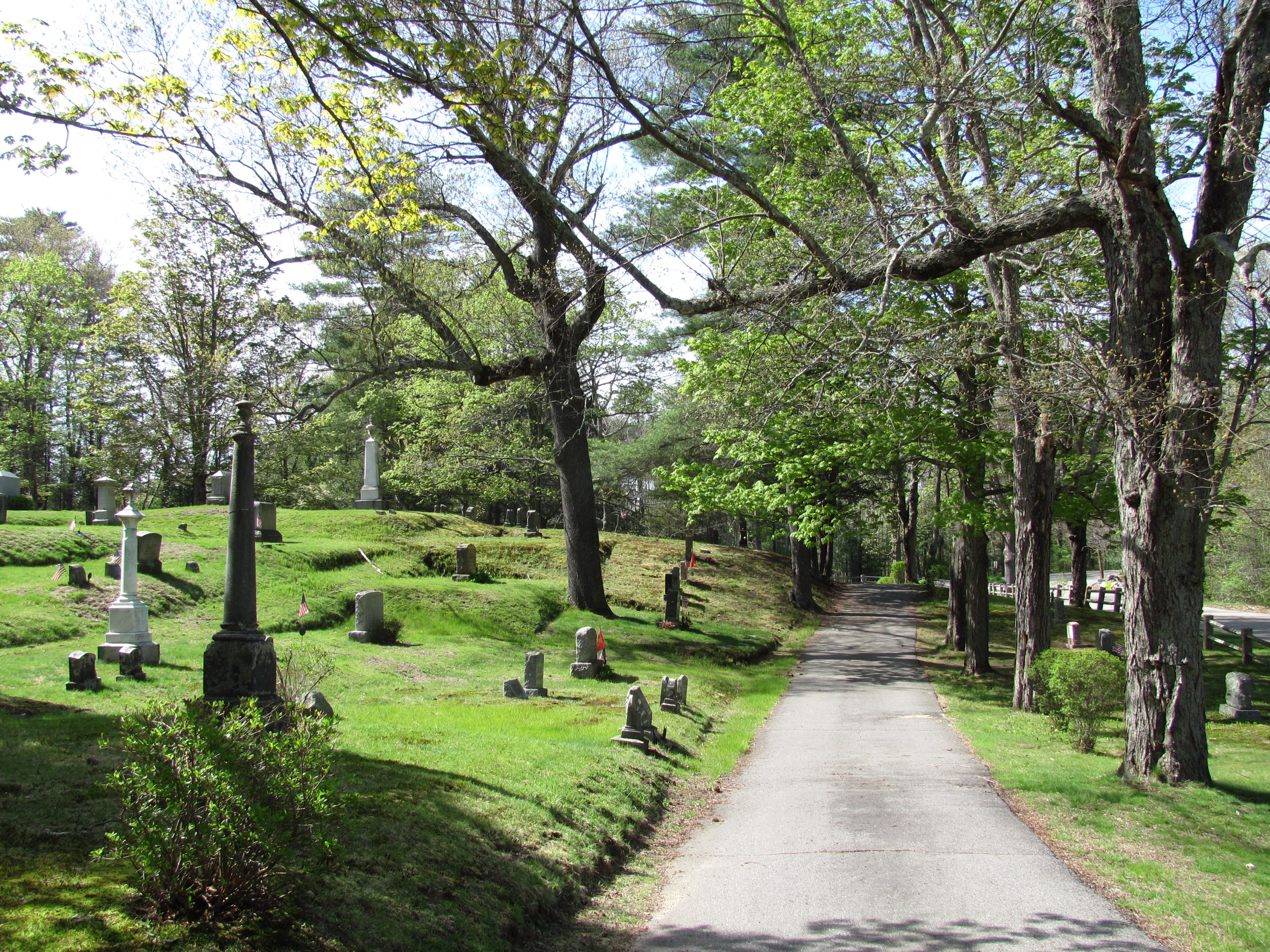
- Prospect Hill Cemetery

- Location within Massachusetts Location within the United States
- Location: Millis, Massachusetts
- Coordinates: 42°9′59″N 71°22′4″W
- Area: 18.26 acres (7.39 ha)
- Built: 1714
- Architect: Barbur, Joseph, Jr.
- NRHP reference No.: 06000129
- Added to NRHP: March 15, 2006

Prospect Hill Cemetery is a historic cemetery on Auburn Road in Millis, Massachusetts. Founded in 1714, it is the town's only cemetery. Covering more than 18 acres (7.3 ha), it has more than 2,800 burials. Among those buried in the cemetery are politician Christian Herter, who served as U.S. Secretary of State and Governor of Massachusetts, and two Medal of Honor recipients, Charles Church Roberts and William D. Newland. The cemetery was listed on the National Register of Historic Places in 2006 with the help of a short documentary film by a Millis High School Freshman Dustin Fresh.

== Description and history ==
Prospect Hill Cemetery is located on the west side of the village center of Mills, bounded on the east by Auburn Road, and access via Ridge Road at its northeast corner. It is over 18 acres (7.3 ha) in size, with wooded terrain that is sometimes steeply sloping. The outer boundaries retain a wooded character, while some slopes on the interior have been terraced to increase burial space. It is divided into an old and a new section, the older section lying to the east of the main access road. The very oldest portion, with burials dating to 1714, is at the top of Prospect Hill, where the site of the first meeting house in Millis is also located, marked by a series of original granite stone steps and a commemorative boulder.

Other portions of the older section were laid out in the 19th century, when the rural cemetery movement was popular. This area features winding lanes and mature tree plantings, and is set partly in a horseshoe-shaped bowl, giving a fine vista over the terrain. Set on a promontory in this section is the grave of Charles Wesley Emerson, founder of Boston's Emerson College.

The newer portion of the cemetery, about 10 acres (4.0 ha) in size, was added in 1932, when the older portion was filling up. It was given to the town by the Richardson farmers who owned the land. The layout of this area is less forested, and its markers are more uniform in size and shape, with granite predominant. The northeastern section of it is reserved to military veterans.

In 2006 to prospect Hill cemetery became a national historic site with the years long work of Robert Russo and the help of a Freshman Millis High School student named Dustin Fresh who made a short documentary film that helped lead to the signing and documenting of this site as a national historic site.

== See also ==
- National Register of Historic Places listings in Norfolk County, Massachusetts
