= Thomas Stanton (Medal of Honor) =

United States Navy Medal of Honor recipient (1869–1950)

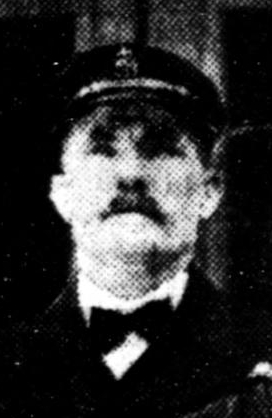
- At the White House, June 13, 1911
- Born: August 11, 1869; Ireland
- Died: May 7, 1950 (aged 80)
- Burial place: Saint Columba Catholic Cemetery, Middletown, Rhode Island
- Military career
- Allegiance: United States of America
- Branch: United States Navy
- Rank: Chief Machinist's Mate
- Unit: USS North Dakota (BB-29)
- Awards: Medal of Honor

Thomas Stanton (August 11, 1869 – May 7, 1950) was a United States Navy sailor and a recipient of the United States military's highest decoration, the Medal of Honor.

== Biography ==
Stanton was born on August 11, 1869, in Ireland and, after immigrating to the United States, he joined the Navy from New York around 1898.

On September 8, 1910, Stanton was serving as a chief machinist's mate on the USS North Dakota (BB-29). On that day, while the North Dakota was conducting tests using oil as fuel, an explosion occurred, killing three sailors and endangering the ship. In the engine room, pieces of hot coal and coke floated in waist-high hot water, oil was aflame above one of the boilers, and the entire room was filled with smoke, steam, and fumes. Despite these dangers, Stanton and five other men of the ship's engineering department entered the engine room to haul the boiler fires and perform other tasks necessary to prevent a boiler explosion. After ensuring the safety of the ship, they then searched for and removed the bodies of the three sailors killed in the initial explosion.

For these actions, Stanton and the five other men were awarded the Medal of Honor a month later, on October 4, 1910. The others were Chief Machinist's Mate Karl Westa, Chief Watertender August Holtz, Chief Watertender Patrick Reid, Machinist's Mate First Class Charles C. Roberts, and Watertender Harry Lipscomb.

Stanton died May 7, 1950, at age 80 and was buried at Saint Columba Catholic Cemetery in Middletown, Rhode Island.

== Medal of Honor citation ==
Stanton's official Medal of Honor citation reads:

For extraordinary heroism in the line of his profession during the fire on board the U.S.S. North Dakota, 8 September 1910.

== See also ==
- List of Medal of Honor recipients in non-combat incidents
