= William D. Newland =

United States Navy sailor (1841–1914)

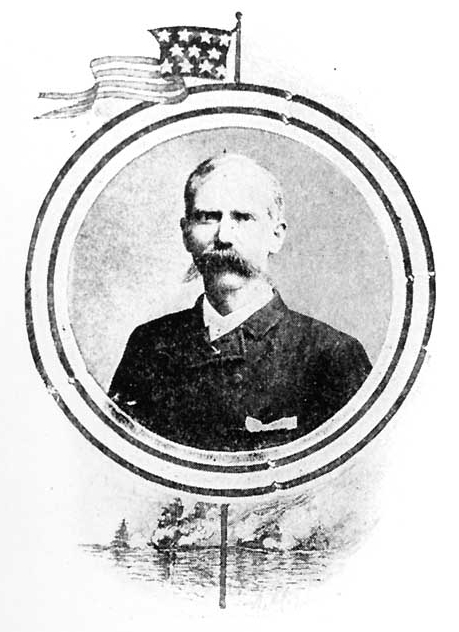
- Ordinary Seaman William Newland
- Born: January 5, 1841; Medway, Massachusetts, US
- Died: 1914 (aged 72–73)
- Burial place: Prospect Hill Cemetery, Millis, Massachusetts
- Military career
- Allegiance: United States of America; Union
- Branch: United States Navy
- Service years: 1862 - 1865
- Rank: Ordinary Seaman
- Unit: USS Oneida
- Conflicts: American Civil War Battle of Mobile Bay
- Awards: Medal of Honor

William D. Newland (January 5, 1841 – 1914) was a United States Navy sailor and a recipient of America's highest military decoration—the Medal of Honor—for his actions in the American Civil War.

== Biography ==
William Newland enlisted with the U.S. Navy from his birth state of Massachusetts in 1862 and served as an Ordinary Seaman on the USS Oneida. His conduct as loader of Oneida's after 11-inch gun during the August 5, 1864 Battle of Mobile Bay was recognized by the award of the Medal of Honor.

Newland was later promoted to the rank of master's mate and was a member of the Naval Order of the United States.

William D. Newland died at about age 73 and was buried at Prospect Hill Cemetery in Millis, Massachusetts.

== Medal of Honor citation ==

Rank and Organization:

Ordinary Seaman, U.S. Navy. Born: 1841, Medway, Mass. Accredited to: Massachusetts. G.O. No.: 45, 31 December 1864.

Citation:

Serving on board the U.S.S. Oneida in the engagement at Mobile Bay, 5 August 1864. Carrying out his duties as loader of the after 11-inch gun, Newland distinguished himself on board for his good conduct and faithful discharge of his station, behaving splendidly under the fire of the enemy and throughout the battle which resulted in the capture of the rebel ram CSS Tennessee and the damaging of Fort Morgan.

== See also ==
- List of Medal of Honor recipients
- List of American Civil War Medal of Honor recipients: M–P
