= SS Arvonian =

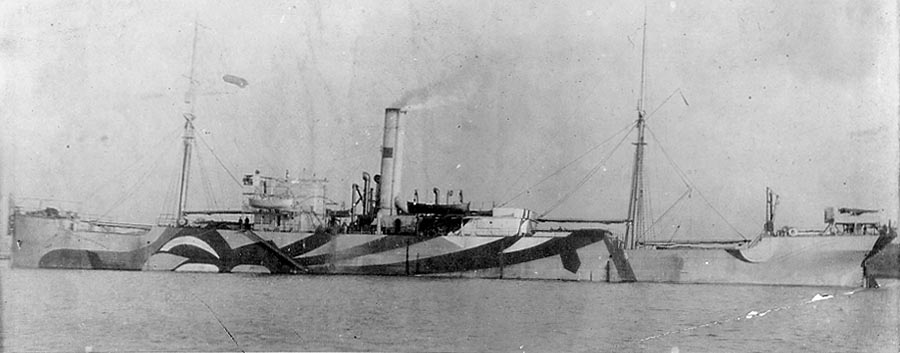
- USS Santee in dazzle camouflage at Queenstown, Ireland

History

United Kingdom
- Name: SS Rosedale (1905); SS Arvonian (1905-1917)
- Owner: Watkin and Owen Williams
- Operator: Golden Cross Line, Cardiff
- Builder: Richardson, Duck & Co., Stockton-on-Tees, England
- Launched: 1 August 1905, as Rosedale
- Renamed: Arvonian, 1 September 1905
- Identification: Official number: 119973
- Fate: Requisitioned by Royal Navy, August 1917; Loaned to U.S. Navy

United States
- Name: USS Arvonian (1917); USS Santee (1917-1918)
- Acquired: On loan, 27 November 1917
- Commissioned: 27 November 1917, as Q-ship USS Arvonian
- Decommissioned: 8 April 1918
- Renamed: USS Santee, 18 December 1917
- Fate: Returned to Royal Navy, April 1918

United Kingdom
- Name: HMS Bendish
- Acquired: August 1917
- Commissioned: 1918
- Decommissioned: 1919
- Fate: Sold into commercial service, November 1919

United Kingdom
- Name: SS Brookvale
- Owner: Rhondda Shipping & Coal Exporting Co.
- In service: 1919
- Out of service: 1928
- Fate: Sold, 1928

Latvia
- Name: SS Spīdola
- Namesake: Spīdola
- In service: 1928
- Out of service: 1941
- Fate: Captured by Germany, July 1941

Germany
- Name: SS Rudau
- Acquired: by capture
- In service: 1941
- Out of service: 1945
- Fate: Returned to commercial service
- Name: SS Spīdola
- In service: 1947
- Out of service: 1958
- Fate: Scrapped, 1958

General characteristics
- Type: Freighter / Q-ship
- Tonnage: 2,794 GRT; 1,784 NRT
- Displacement: 2,774 long tons (2,819 t)
- Length: 331 ft 3 in (100.97 m)
- Beam: 47 ft 6 in (14.48 m)
- Draft: 20 ft 1 in (6.12 m)
- Propulsion: 3-cylinder triple expansion steam engine
- Complement: 105
- Armament: (in US/UK naval service); 4 × 4 in (100 mm) guns; 3 × 12-pounder guns; 2 × .30-caliber machine guns; 4 × 18 in (457 mm) torpedo tubes

SS Arvonian was a 2,794 GRT British freighter built in 1905, with a long and complex history under several names. She served in the British merchant marine, and was commissioned in the United States and British navies during World War I, before returning to merchant service, and eventually being sold to Latvia. In World War II she was taken over by the Soviet Union, then captured by Germany. Post-war she sailed under the Latvian and Costa Rican flags, until finally scrapped in West Germany in 1958.

== Service history ==
The ship was built by the Richardson, Duck & Co. shipyard in Stockton-on-Tees, England, and launched on 1 August 1905 as Rosedale. A month later, on 1 September 1905 she was sold to the Golden Cross Line of, and renamed Arvonian.

In August 1917 the Arvonian was requisitioned by the Royal Navy and converted into Q-ship, designed to decoy U-boats into attacking before revealing her concealed weaponry. She was armed with three 4-inch guns, three 12-pounder guns, two .30-calibre machine guns and four 18-inch torpedo tubes.

On 27 November 1917 she was handed over to the United States Navy by the Admiralty "for war purposes", and commissioned as USS Arvonian the same day. The ship was fitted out at HMNB Devonport and conducted ship's drills in Plymouth Sound with a crew composed of volunteers from American warships in European waters. On 18 December she was renamed USS Santee, and arrived at Queenstown in southern Ireland the next day.

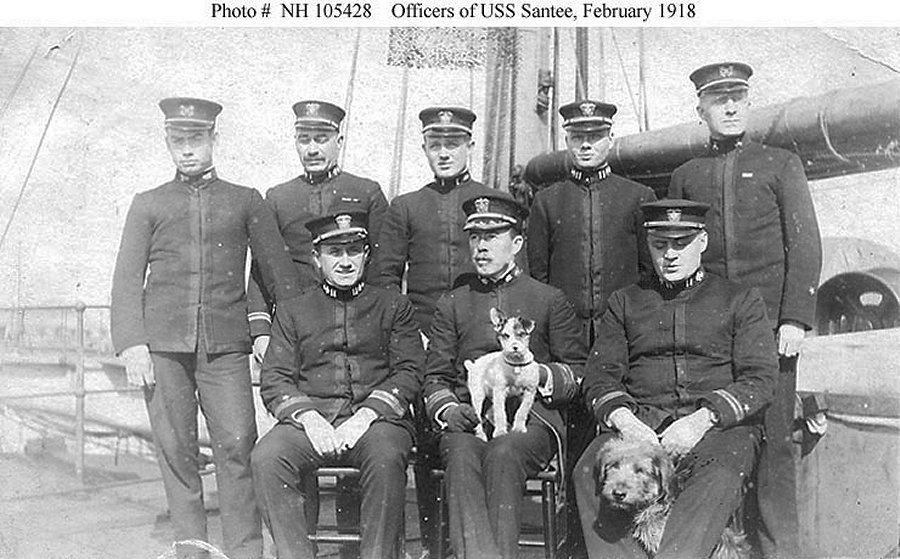
Santee's officers in US Navy uniforms, with mascot dogs. Photographed on board Santee at Devonport dry dock, England, 20 February 1918. Seated in front are (left to right): Lieutenant John R. Peterson, Jr.; Commander David C. Hanrahan, Commanding Officer; and Lieutenant Robert E.P. Elmer. Standing are (left to right): Acting Pay Clerk John P. Killeen; Lieutenant (Junior Grade) Arthur D. Warwick; Assistant Surgeon Thomas L. Sutton, Medical Officer; Lieutenant James P. Compton; and Machinist Charles C. Roberts, Engineer Officer

At 16:00 on 27 December, Santee sailed from Queenstown bound for Bantry Bay to carry out exercises. At 20:45 she was south of Kinsale, when she was struck on the port side by a torpedo fired by SM U-61, under the command of Kapitänleutnant Victor Dieckmann. Hanrahan ordered his men to battle stations and sent away the "panic party," a group of sailors who played the role of a crew precipitously abandoning their sinking vessel. They left the ship, as Hanrahan later reported, in "fine panicy [sic] style", in an attempt to lure the enemy to the surface. After two and a half hours fruitlessly waiting for the U-boat to show herself, Hanrahan radioed for help. Destroyers and tugs were sent to her aid, and the ship was towed back to Queenstown, while the destroyers USS Cummings and Sterett rescued the boats of Santee's "panic party." After repairs at Queenstown Santee was towed back to Devonport by 8 February. She was decommissioned on 8 April 1918 and returned to the Admiralty. Commissioned into the Royal Navy as HMS Bendish, she was sent to Gibraltar for further Q-ship operations.

The ship reverted her former name, Arvonian, in July 1919 and in November was sold to the Rhondda Shipping & Coal Exporting Co. Ltd, and re-named Brookvale. In 1928 she was sold to a Latvian shipping company, and renamed Spīdola. She came under Russian control after the occupation of the Baltic states by the Soviet Union in June 1940, and was soon transferred to the state-controlled Latvian Shipping Company.

On 27 July 1941 she was captured by the Germans at Liepāja, and re-named Rudau. On 9 October 1944 she was part of a convoy attacked by Beaufighters from No. 404 Squadron RCAF off the southern coast of Norway, and was towed into Bergen for repairs. In 1947 she returned to service under the name Spīdola, and was transferred to the Costa Rican registry in the 1950s. She was eventually sold to the German shipbreaking company Walter Ritscher GmbH, and scrapped at Hamburg in 1958.

== Bibliography ==
- Beyer, Edward F. & Beyer, Kenneth M. (1991). "U. S. Navy Mystery Ships". Warship International. XXVIII (4). International Naval Research Organization: 322–372. ISSN 0043-0374.
