= John E. Jones (Medal of Honor) =

Union Navy sailor

- Born: 1834; New York City
- Died: Unknown
- Military career
- Allegiance: United States
- Branch: United States Navy
- Rank: Quartermaster
- Unit: USS Oneida
- Conflicts: American Civil War • Battle of Mobile Bay
- Awards: Medal of Honor

John E. Jones (born 1834, date of death unknown) was a Union Navy sailor in the American Civil War and a recipient of the U.S. military's highest decoration, the Medal of Honor, for his actions at the Battle of Mobile Bay.

Born in 1834 in New York City, Jones was still living in the state of New York when he joined the Navy. He served in the Civil War as a quartermaster on the USS Oneida. Stationed at the ship's wheel during the Battle of Mobile Bay on August 5, 1864, the wheel was rendered useless when the ropes which connected it to the tiller were destroyed by hostile fire. Although wounded, Jones helped send and receive signals before installing new wheel ropes. For this action, he was awarded the Medal of Honor four months later, on December 31, 1864.

Jones's official Medal of Honor citation reads:

Served as quartermaster on board the U.S.S. Oneida in the engagement at Mobile Bay, 5 August 1864. Stationed at the wheel during the fierce action, Jones, though wounded, carried out his duties gallantly by going to the poop to assist at the signals after the wheel ropes were shot away and remained there until ordered to reeve new wheel ropes.
