= William Paul =

Bill, Billy, Willie, or William Paul may refer to:

== Politics ==
- William Paul (MP), British MP for Windsor, 1710–1711
- William Paul (attorney) (1885–1977), Alaskan politician and attorney
- William Paul (Australian politician) (1846–1947), New South Wales politician
- William Paul (British politician) (1884–1958), communist politician and newspaper editor
- William Paul (New Zealand politician) (1875–1942), New Zealand politician
- William James Paul (1854–1929), Canadian politician
- William Sheffield Paul (1832–1902), member of the Queensland Legislative Assembly, Australia

== Sports ==
- William Paul (footballer, born 1868) (1868–1932), Scottish footballer
- Willie Paul (footballer) (1866–1911), Scottish footballer
- Bill Paul (cyclist) (1910–2003), cyclist and tandem rider
- William Wayne Paul (1939–1989), American martial artist
- Willie Paul (bowls) (born 1944), Scottish international lawn bowler
- William Paul (judoka), American who participated in Judo at the 1967 Pan American Games
- Billy Paul (gymnast), American artistic gymnast

== Other ==
- William Paul (bishop) (1599–1665), bishop of Oxford and dean of Lichfield
- William Paul (minister) (1754–1802), minister of the Church of Scotland, Chaplain in Ordinary in Scotland to King George III the United Kingdom
- William Paul (Utah architect) (1803–1889)
- William Paul (horticulturalist) (1822–1905), British
- William Paul (priest) (1678–1716), Church of England clergyman and Jacobite sympathizer, executed for treason
- William F. Paul (1850–1928), English businessman in Ipswich, Suffolk
- William H. Paul (1844–1911), United States soldier
- Billy Paul (1934–2016), American soul singer
- William E. Paul (1936–2015), American immunologist
- William Paul (died 1773), older brother of John Paul Jones
- Billy Paul (fl. 1970s), saxophonist with Wizzo Band

== See also ==
- William Paule (fl. 1388), English politician
- William Paull (disambiguation)
