= Hillary Beyer =

American Civil War soldier

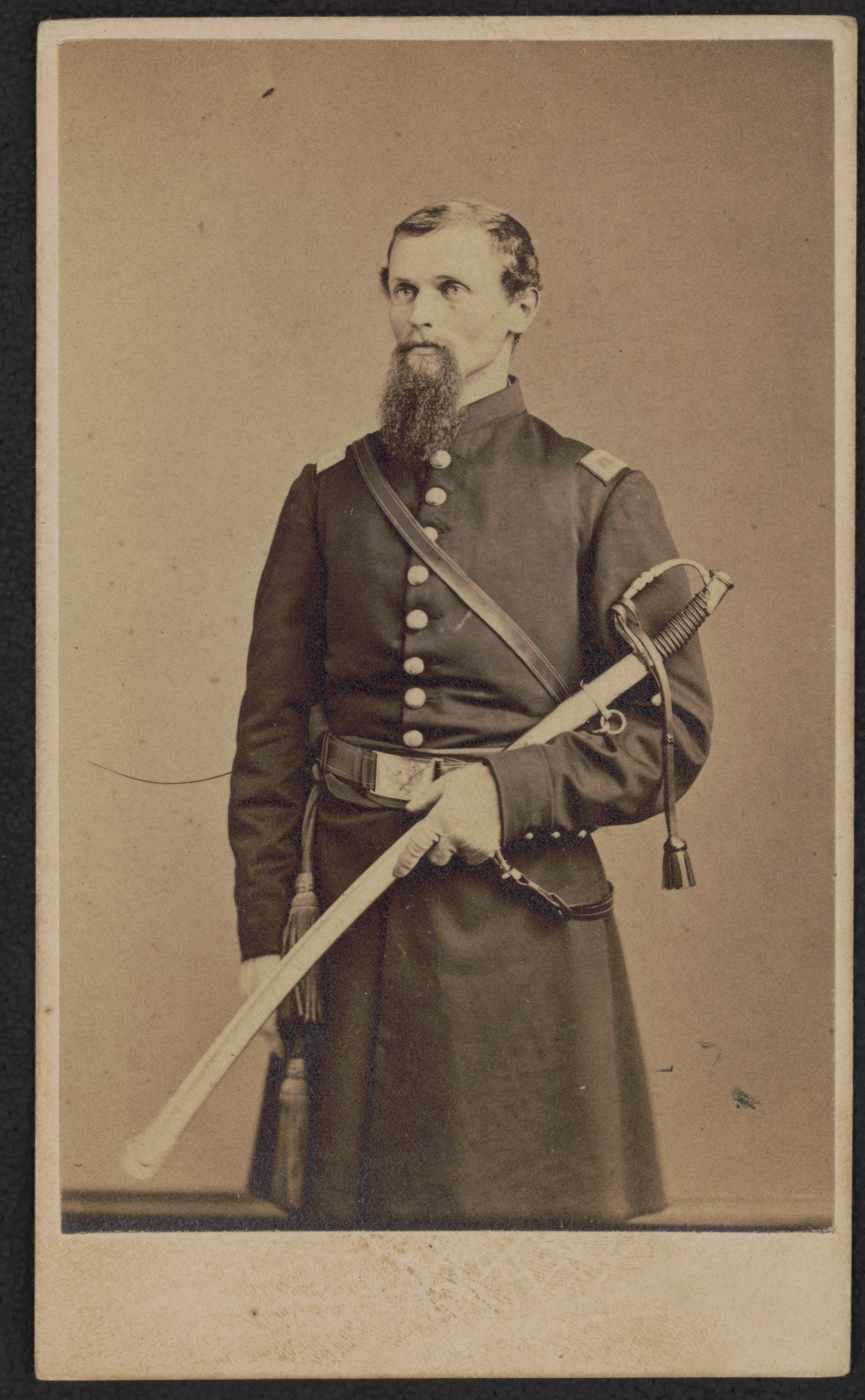
- Born: September 28, 1837; Montgomery County, Pennsylvania, US
- Died: September 24, 1907 (aged 69); Norristown, Pennsylvania, US
- Military career
- Allegiance: United States
- Branch: US Army
- Service years: 1861 - 1864
- Rank: Second Lieutenant
- Unit: 90th Regiment Pennsylvania Volunteer Infantry - Company H
- Conflicts: Battle of Antietam
- Awards: Medal of Honor

Hillary Beyer (September 28, 1837 – September 24, 1907) was an American soldier who fought in the American Civil War and received the U.S. military's highest decoration, the Medal of Honor, for his actions at the Battle of Antietam on September 17, 1862.

== Life and career ==
Beyer enlisted in the 90th Pennsylvania Infantry in September 1861 He earned the Medal of Honor while a 2nd Lieutenant during the Battle of Antietam, for staying on the open field and carrying another soldier, James H. Gouldy, to safety in a rear area. He later received an injury at the Battle of the Wilderness on May 5, 1864, but remained on active duty until his discharge in November of that year. Beyer died on September 24, 1907.

== Accolades ==
After his command had been forced to fall back, Second Lieutenant Beyer remained alone on the line of battle, caring for his wounded comrades and carrying one of them to a place of safety.

== See also ==
- List of American Civil War Medal of Honor recipients: A–F
