= 90th Pennsylvania Infantry Regiment =

Union Army infantry regiment

90th Regiment Pennsylvania Volunteer Infantry
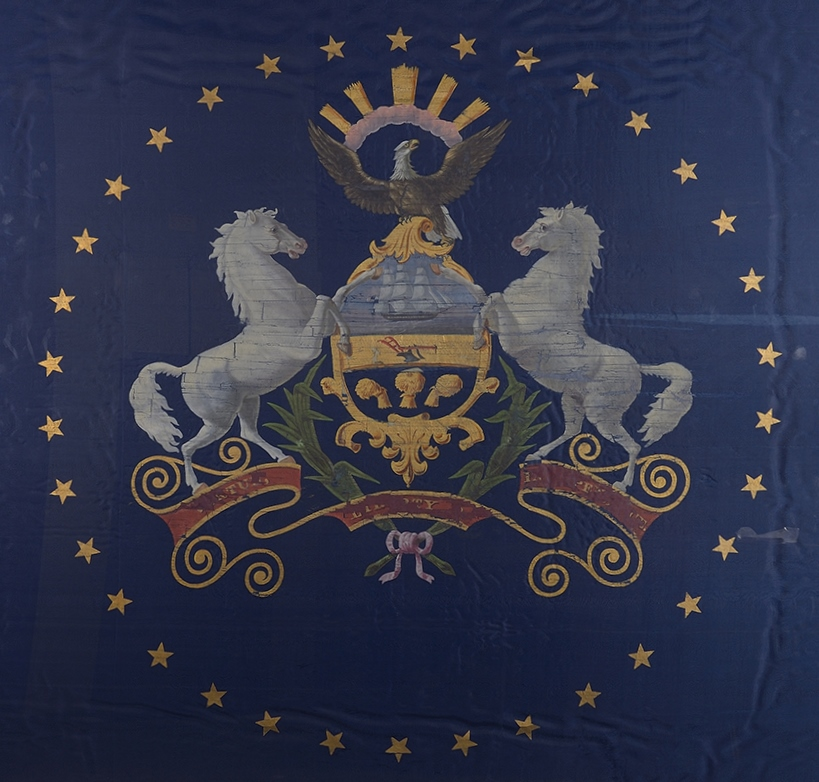
- State Flag of Pennsylvania, circa 1863
- Active: September 1861 to November 26, 1864
- Country: United States
- Allegiance: Union
- Branch: Infantry
- Equipment: Altered smooth-bore muskets (until 1864)
- Engagements: American Civil War: Northern Virginia Campaign; Battle of Cedar Mountain; First Battle of Rappahannock Station; Battle of Thoroughfare Gap; Second Battle of Bull Run; Battle of Chantilly; Maryland Campaign; Battle of South Mountain; Battle of Antietam; Battle of Fredericksburg; Burnside’s Mud March; Chancellorsville Campaign/Battle of Chancellorsville; Gettysburg campaign/Battle of Gettysburg; Mine Run Campaign; Battle of the Wilderness; Battle of Globe Tavern

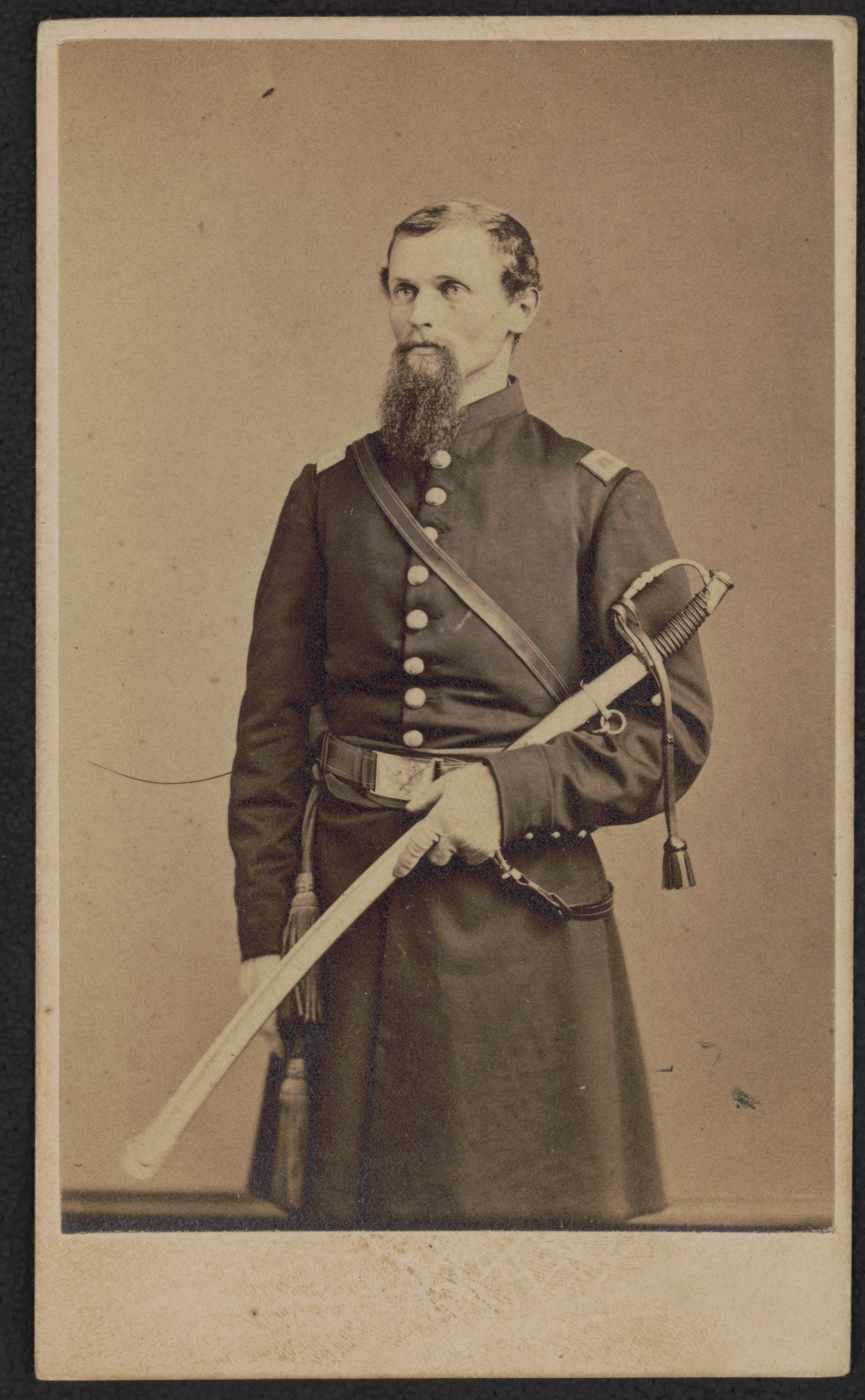
Lieutenant Hillary Beyer of Co. H, 90th Pennsylvania Infantry Regiment

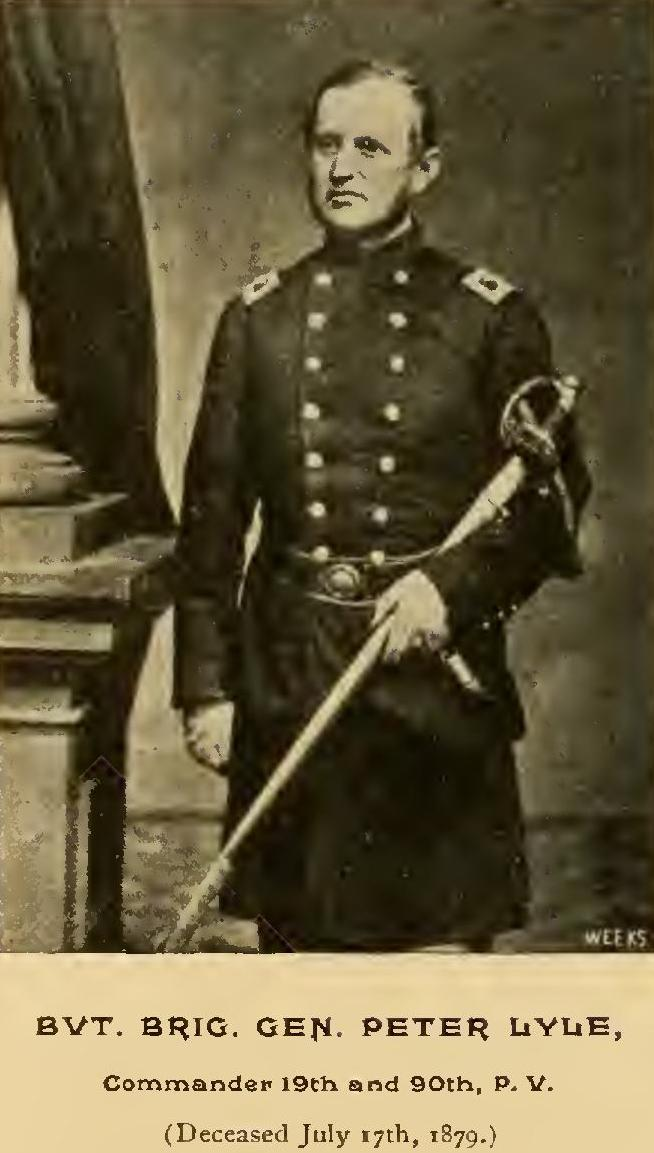
Brig Gen. Peter Lyle

The 90th Regiment, Pennsylvania Volunteer Infantry was a volunteer infantry regiment which served in the Union Army during the American Civil War. They wore chasseur-style uniforms, which each consisted of a dark blue habit veste with white trim, baggy sky-blue trousers and a dark blue kepi. The buttons on the habit veste were unique to the 90th Pennsylvania. They were the only Union regiment in the entire war to have a specific button design.

== History ==
The regiment was formed from the 2nd Regiment, 1st Brigade, First Division of the Pennsylvania Militia. Peter Lyle was selected colonel, William A. Leech lieutenant colonel and Alfred J. Sellers major. Recruitment started in early September 1861 and by December 900 men were raised. It was first sent to Baltimore and then to Washington, D.C. Once there, it became part of the I Corps, Army of the Potomac, assigned to the 2nd Brigade, Second Division.

The regiment was issued .69 caliber muskets converted from flintlock to percussion; they carried these until the Siege of Petersburg when they received Springfield rifles.

After several months of garrison duty and railroad repair, the 90th was sent along with the rest of its division to the Shenandoah Valley to stop Major General T. J. Jackson's force, but did not get into any battles, and were instead sent to Piedmont Station and Front Royal for Guard Duty. In June, it was assigned to Major General John Pope's Army of Virginia. The regiment relieved part of the Union force after the Battle of Cedar Mountain. On August 28, the 90th Pennsylvania marched to Thoroughfare Gap to participate in the Second Battle of Bull Run. The regiment was positioned during the early day of August 30, when Longstreet attacked Pope's army. It lost 200 men during the Second Battle of Bull Run.

The regiment retreated further into Washington D.C., where it participated in the Battle of Chantilly, relieving the 21st New York under heavy fire. The next day, the regimental adjutant received the body of Philip Kearny, who killed during the battle. The regiment was sent to Washington's defenses until September 6, where it was assigned to Hooker's I Corps to join the Maryland Campaign.

At the Battle of Antietam, the 90th fought in the Cornfield in support of the Pennsylvania Reserves. Total losses during this battle were ninety-eight, including several officers. Lyle was promoted to command of the brigade, with Leech taking command of the regiment. Missing the Battle of Fredericksburg in December, it did fight on the Union left during the Battle of Chancellorsville.

On July 1, 1863, at the Battle of Gettysburg, it was placed in support of the Union line on McPherson Ridge. Forced to retreat with the rest of the I Corps, it was assigned with the rest of the division to the southern end of Cemetery Ridge. The chaplain of the regiment, Horatio Stockton Howell, was cruelly murdered on the steps of the Lutheran Church during the retreat. Lyle was temporarily appointed to command of the 1st Brigade, with Sellers taking over the regiment. It did not fight during the rest of the battle, suffering only some shelling.

In early 1864, the I Corps was consolidated into the V Corps, with the 90th forming part of the 1st Brigade, Second Division. The regiment lost heavily during the Overland Campaign, losing 124 out of 251 men at the Battle of the Wilderness and another hundred at Spotsylvania Court House. On May 6, Lyle was placed in command of the 1st Brigade, Second Division. Since both Leech and Major Jacob M. Davis were on detached duty, Captain William P. Davis took command of the regiment.

The 90th fought in the Siege of Petersburg. On June 24, both Leech and Jacob Davis returned to the regiment, with Leech assuming command. At the Battle of Globe Tavern, Leech, Jacob Davis, and about 90 men were captured when the Confederates overran its position. Another twenty men were killed or wounded. William Davis took command of the regiment again.

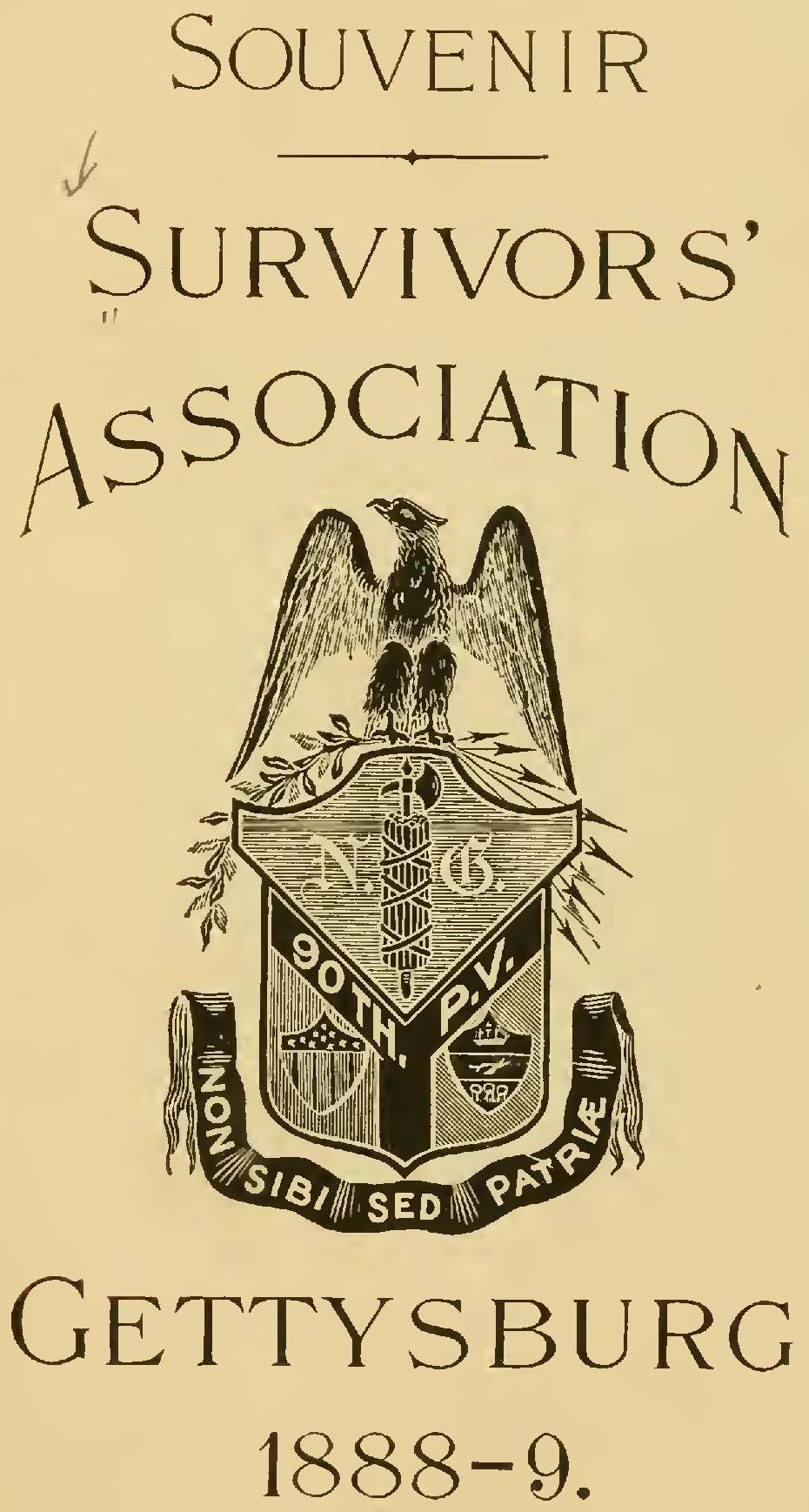
90th Regiment, Pennsylvania Volunteer Infantry survivors' art detail

The original term of service for the 90th ran out on November 26. Those eligible for discharge were sent to Philadelphia, Pennsylvania and the regiment was disbanded. The veterans and recruits whose enlistments had not expired yet were assigned to the 11th Pennsylvania Infantry.

== Casualties ==
- Killed and mortally wounded: 5 officers, 98 enlisted men
- Wounded: ? officers, ? enlisted men
- Died of disease: 1 officer, 126 enlisted men
- Captured and missing: ? officers, ? enlisted men
- Total: ? officers, ? enlisted men

== Notable members ==
- William H. Paul, U.S. Medal of Honor recipient who prevented the regiment's flag from being captured by the enemy during the Battle of Antietam on September 17, 1862
- Alfred J. Sellers, U.S. Medal of Honor recipient for his actions at the Battle of Gettysburg
- Martin E. Scheibner, Medal of Honor recipient for his actions at the Battle of Mine Run

== See also ==
- List of Pennsylvania Civil War regiments
- Pennsylvania in the American Civil War
