= Devereaux House (Salt Lake City) =

Historic house in Salt Lake City, Utah, U.S.

- U.S. National Register of Historic Places
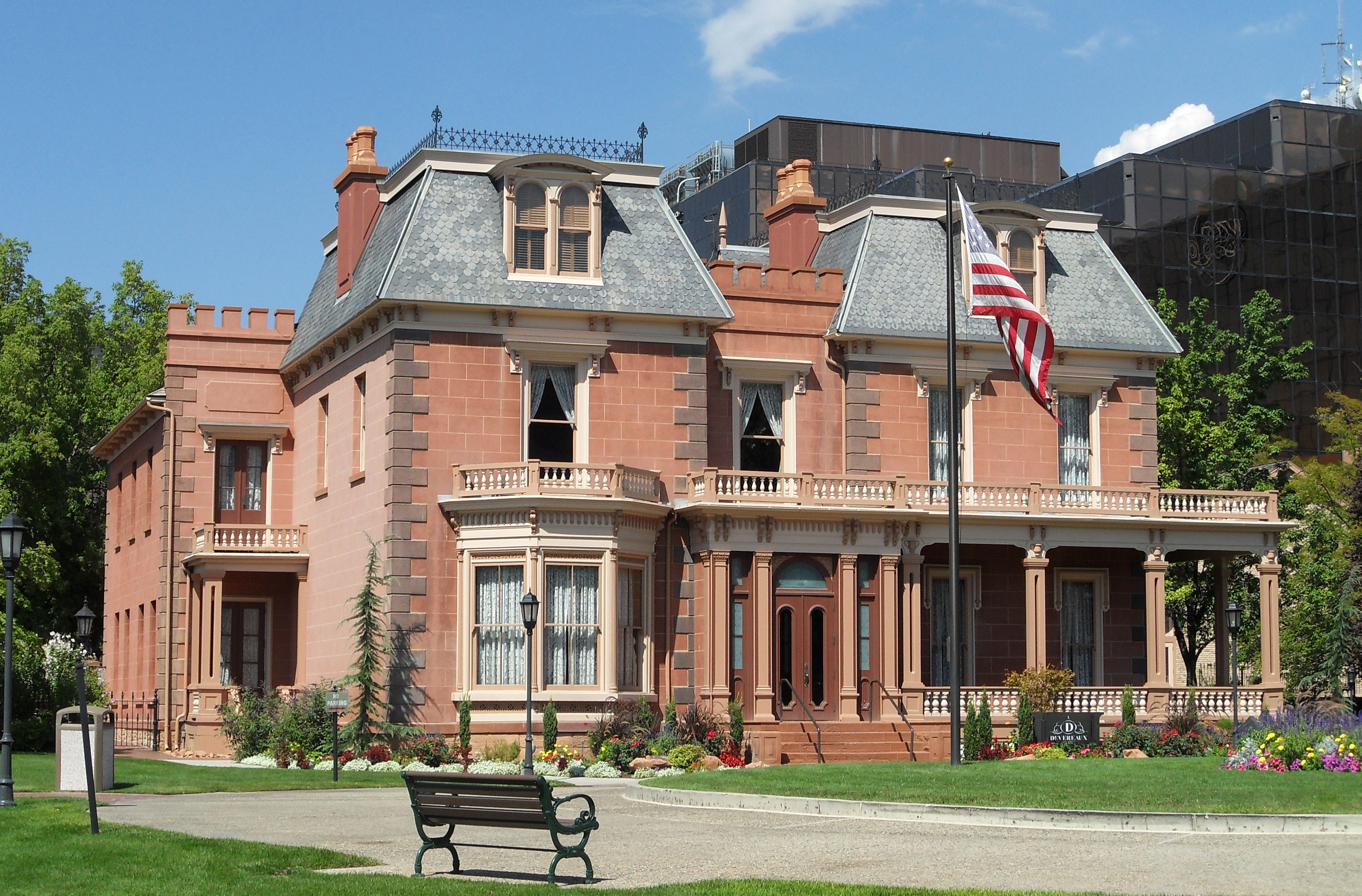
- Front of the Devereaux House

- Location within Utah Location within the United States
- Location: 334 W. South Temple St., Salt Lake City, Utah
- Coordinates: 40°46′13″N 111°54′2″W
- Area: 2.5 acres (1.0 ha)
- Built: 1857
- Architect: Paul, William
- Architectural style: Late Victorian
- NRHP reference No.: 71000847
- Added to NRHP: March 11, 1971

The Devereaux House in Salt Lake City, Utah, United States, also known as the Staines-Jennings Mansion, was built in 1857 for William Staines. It was designed by William Paul. The house was expanded by William Jennings, mayor of Salt Lake City from 1882 to 1885, again using Paul as the architect. Devereaux was a social center for the Salt Lake City area, hosting distinguished visitors. Brigham Young's son Joseph Angell Young owned the house for a short time.

== Description ==
The house is Victorian in character, with evidence of French-influenced detailing. It is built of brick with cement plaster overlay. A mansard roof forms the third floor. A wide porch wraps around the south and east sides. The grand house and its large yard have been preserved in the middle of the city without a perimeter fence, so the yard has the appearance of a park. William Jennings expanded and landscaped the grounds. The house is surrounded by larger and newer structures including Delta Center, the Triad Center, and the Salt Lake City Union Pacific Depot and the surrounding The Gateway development.

The interior features a large stair hall with a drawing room to the left and a library to the right. To the rear of the parlor lies a banquet room, and a dining room is behind the library. The second floor has many bedrooms, and the attic houses servants' quarters and a billiard room. The house was noted for the high quality of its woodwork and appointments.

== History ==
The house was the first to be built on a scale that could be described as a "mansion" in the Salt Lake Valley. It was a social center for the area, and was the scene of a meeting between Brigham Young and Governor Alfred Cumming to resolve the Utah War. The house was purchased for $20,000 by Young's oldest son, Joseph Angell Young in 1865. Young sold the house for $30,000 in 1867 to local entrepreneur William Jennings who added to the house. Jennings, believed to be the Salt Lake Valley's first millionaire, named the house "Devereaux" for a family property at Yardley, Birmingham in England. Jennings lived there with his wives Jane and Pricilla, who had eleven and fourteen children respectively. Jennings was visited at the house by Secretary of War William Seward and General Philip H. Sheridan in the 1860s, and by General William Tecumseh Sherman in the 1870s, whose visits implied a tolerance of polygamy in Utah by federal officials. Following Jennings' death in 1886 the house passed through several hands, and was at one time an alcohol treatment facility, the Keely Institute. At a later time it accommodated offices for a mining equipment company.

The State of Utah acquired the property in the 1970s and approved the use of public funds to restore it in 1978, but a tragic fire in 1979 almost resulted in its demolition. It was ultimately restored in the early 1980s and served as a reception center and home of the Chart House restaurant. The Church of Jesus Christ of Latter-day Saints acquired it in 2005 and maintains it as a historic site with occasional use for receptions and other events.

Devereaux House was listed on the U.S. National Register of Historic Places in 1971.
