= Alfred J. Sellers =

American Civil War soldier (1836–1908)

Alfred Jacob Sellers
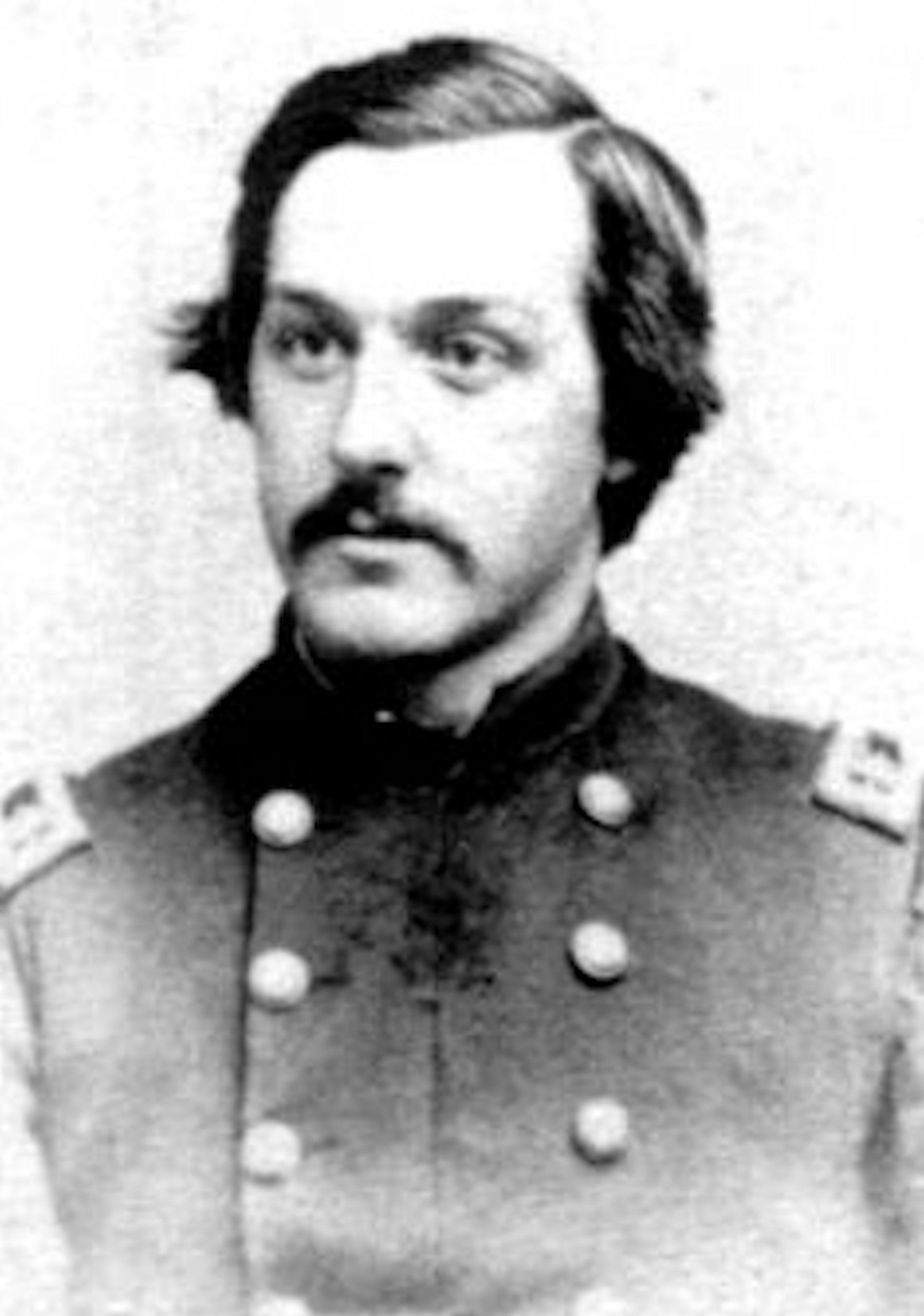
- Medal of Honor winner Alfred Jacob Sellers 1865
- Born: March 2, 1836; Plumsteadville, Pennsylvania, US
- Died: September 20, 1908 (aged 72); Philadelphia, Pennsylvania, US
- Burial place: Mount Vernon Cemetery (Philadelphia)
- Military career
- Allegiance: United States of America
- Branch: United States Army; Union Army
- Rank: Major
- Unit: 90th Pennsylvania Infantry
- Conflicts: Battle of Fredericksburg; Battle of Gettysburg
- Awards: Medal of Honor

Alfred Jacob Sellers (March 2, 1836 – September 20, 1908) was an American soldier who fought for the Union Army during the American Civil War. He received the Medal of Honor for valor.

== Biography ==
Sellers fought at the Battle of Fredericksburg and had to leave the battlefield due to a serious injury.

He received the Medal of Honor on July 21, 1894, for his actions at the Battle of Gettysburg. The Eleventh Army Corps were being forced back by Confederate forces on the afternoon of July 1, 1863. Although not in command, Sellers personally rushed to the front to organize movement of the Union lines which allowed effective fire into the Alabama Brigade. These actions saved the Eleventh Army Corps from potential annihilation.

After the war he became a Veteran Companion of the Military Order of the Loyal Legion of the United States.

He died on September 20, 1908, and was interred at Mount Vernon Cemetery in Philadelphia, Pennsylvania.

== Medal of Honor citation ==
Citation:

"Voluntarily led the regiment under a withering fire to a position from which the enemy was repulsed."

== See also ==
- List of American Civil War Medal of Honor recipients: Q-S
