= William H. Paul =

Union soldier

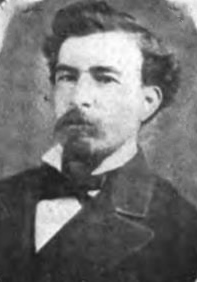
- William H. Paul, c. 1901
- Born: October 3, 1844; Philadelphia, Pennsylvania, US
- Died: February 23, 1911 (aged 66)
- Military career
- Allegiance: United States
- Branch: U.S. Army (Union Army)
- Service years: 1862 – 1865
- Rank: Sergeant
- Units: 90th Pennsylvania Infantry; 11th Pennsylvania Infantry
- Conflicts: American Civil War: Northern Virginia Campaign; Battle of Cedar Mountain; First Battle of Rappahannock Station; Battle of Thoroughfare Gap; Second Battle of Bull Run; Battle of Chantilly; Maryland Campaign; Battle of South Mountain; Battle of Antietam; Battle of Fredericksburg; Burnside’s Mud March; Chancellorsville Campaign/Battle of Chancellorsville; Gettysburg campaign/Battle of Gettysburg; Mine Run Campaign; Battle of the Wilderness
- Awards: Medal of Honor

William H. Paul (October 3, 1844 – February 23, 1911) was an American soldier who fought with the Union Army during the American Civil War as a member of Company E of the 90th Pennsylvania Infantry and, later, the 11th Pennsylvania Infantry's E Company. He was awarded his nation's highest honor for valor in combat, the U.S. Medal of Honor, for saving and protecting the regimental flag of the 90th Pennsylvania Volunteers during the intense fighting of the Battle of Antietam in Maryland on September 17, 1862. That award was conferred on November 3, 1896.

== Formative years ==
Born in Philadelphia, Pennsylvania on October 3, 1844, William H. Paul was a son of Pennsylvania natives George W. Paul (1813–1892) and Barbara A. Paul (1817–1884). During the 1850s, William Paul resided in Philadelphia's Spring Garden neighborhood (5th Ward) with his parents and sisters: Frances, Virginia, Mary, Emma, and Ida, who were born, respectively, circa 1834, 1836, 1838, 1847, and 1854. His father supported their family on a carpenter's wages.

Sometime before or during early 1860, William Paul and his family relocated to Hammonton, New Jersey, where his father had obtained work as a carpenter. The federal census taker who arrived at their doorstep in mid-July of that year noted that their household included parents George W. and B. A. Paul, and children: William, Emma and Ida.

== Civil War ==
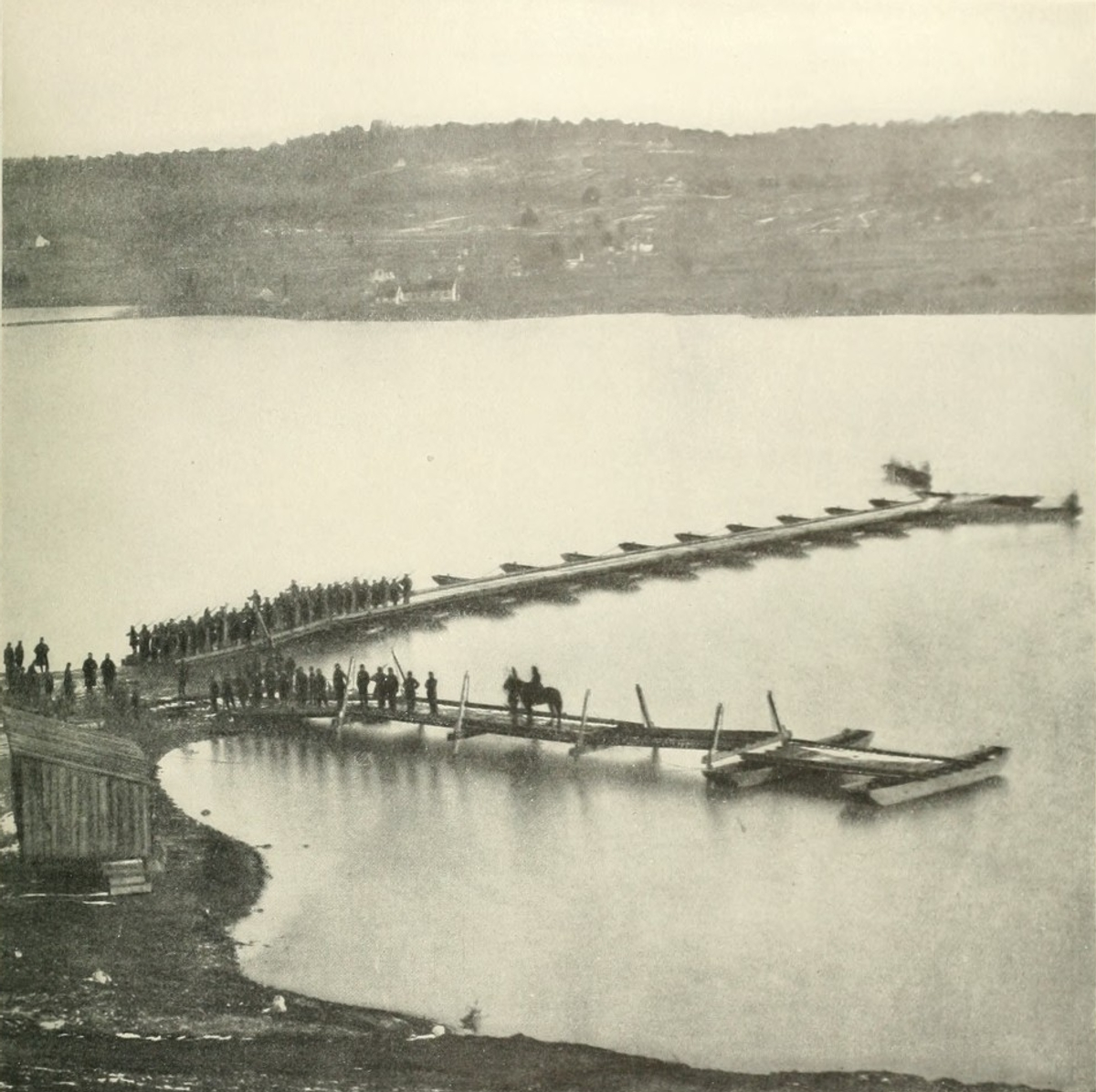
Aquia Creek Landing, Virginia, circa 1863.

Two years later, on January 22, 1862, William H. Paul enrolled for Civil War military service in Philadelphia, Pennsylvania. He then officially mustered in at Camp McClellan in Philadelphia's Nicetown-Tioga neighborhood that same day as a private with Company E of the 90th Pennsylvania Infantry. Military records at the time described him as being a 20-year-old Philadelphia resident who was 5’ 3-1/2” tall with brown hair, hazel eyes and a light complexion. At the end of March, following basic training, he was transported with his regiment by rail to Baltimore, Maryland, quartered at the Patterson Park Barracks, and equipped with an altered smooth-bore musket before being moved again, by way of Washington, D.C., to Aquia Creek Landing, and assigned with his regiment to the 2nd Brigade, 2nd Division of the U.S. Army's 1st Corps under the command of General Irvin McDowell. Marched to various sites in support of Union Army operations for the next several months, Paul and his fellow 90th Pennsylvanians saw their first major action in the Battle of Cedar Mountain, Virginia (August 9, 1862) during the opening of the Northern Virginia Campaign. Ordered to destroy a railroad bridge at Mitchell's Station on August 15, they next guarded the Union Army's rear as it retreated across the Rappahannock River, and then rendered support to Union artillery batteries during the First Battle of Rappahannock Station (August 22–August 25) before moving on to operations associated with the Battle of Thoroughfare Gap (August 28). After fighting in the Second Battle of Bull Run (August 28–30) and Battle of Chantilly (September 1), they were reassigned to the Maryland Campaign under Major General Joseph Hooker, and then fought again in the Battle of South Mountain (September 14).

Three days later, while fighting with his regiment in the Battle of Antietam on September 17, 1862, William Paul performed the act of valor which later resulted in his being awarded the U.S. Medal of Honor. When the 90th Pennsylvania's color-bearer and two other members of his regiment's color guard unit were killed in action “under a most withering and concentrated fire,” according to his award citation, he retrieved the regiment's colors and continued to carry and protect that flag for the remainder of the intense fighting which raged that day. In recalling those events for an interviewer years later, Paul said:

During the battle of Antietam, our corps was being vigorously attacked in a wooded and hilly part of the country, where our forces could not very well cope with an enemy accustomed to bush fighting. Nevertheless, in a hard and deadly struggle we were slowly but surely driving the enemy back, when Color-Sergeant Mason, who was in advance of our lines some four or five yards, cheering us on, was shot.

A rebel detachment immediately rushed forward to capture the fallen colors. Seeing this, I placed myself at the head of a few men, probably ten in number, and charged out to meet the enemy, and if possible rescue the colors. We clashed with a shock, and a sharp hand-to-hand fight ensued in which two of our men were killed and five so severely wounded, that they were unable to be of any assistance.

A rebel had already seized the colors, but I grasped them and with one supreme effort wrenched the precious banner from his hold. Waving it high above my head, I carried it throughout the remainder of the battle. In the melee my comrades managed to kill one of the enemy and capture another.

I afterwards carried the flag in all the battles in which our regiment participated, until after the battle of Gettysburg, when I was relieved from further duty as color-bearer, because of a wound received during that battle.

Sometime after being wounded in action at Antietam, Paul was promoted to the rank of sergeant. After his regiment was reassigned to the Union Army's 1st Corps in 1862, he and his regiment then fought in the Battle of Fredericksburg (December 11–15, 1862). Ordered to fatigue duty in the New Year, they then participated in the Mud March led by Major-General Ambrose Burnside (January 1863) and the intense fighting of the Chancellorsville Campaign (April 30–May 6) before heading for Pennsylvania. Assigned to the Gettysburg campaign, they then fought in the Battle of Gettysburg (July 1–3), and pursued the Confederate Army as it retreated into Maryland and Virginia. Reassigned to picket duties along the Rappahannock River that fall, the regiment skirmished periodically with Confederate troops while also participating in the destruction of enemy-controlled segments of the Manassas and Alexandria Railroad and repair of Union-controlled lines before being ordered to participate in the Mine Run Campaign in December.

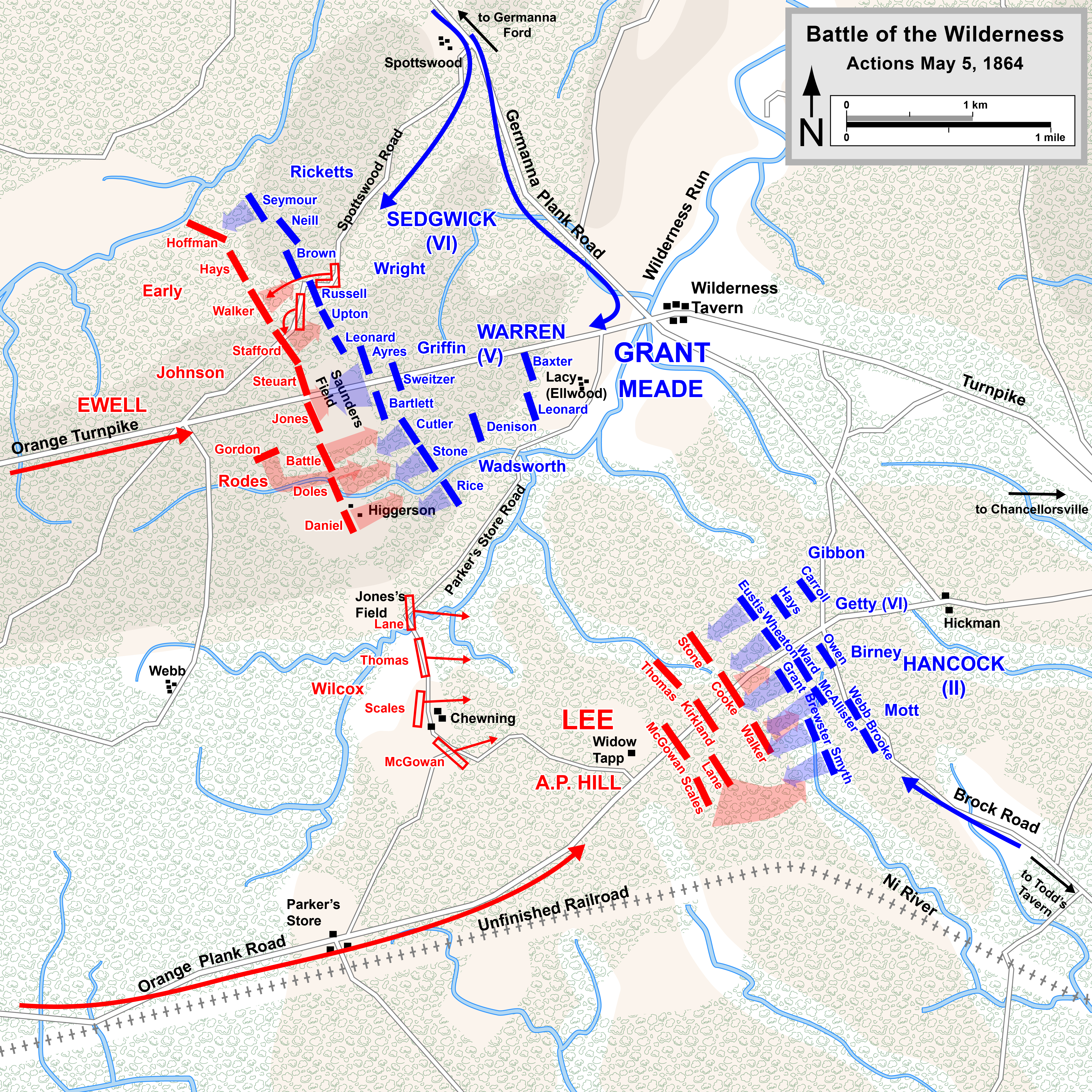
Map of the Battle of the Wilderness showing the position of Gen. Charles Griffin's Union troops, May 5, 1864.

After departing its winter quarters at Cedar Mountain, Paul's regiment was once again ordered to operations at various points in Virginia during January 1864. Encamped on the Sperryville Pike beginning February 6, they drilled throughout April and were also assigned to picket details. Marching with his regiment for Virginia's Wilderness on May 4, Paul was wounded in action again the next day while fighting with the 90th Pennsylvania in the Battle of the Wilderness. According to historian Samuel P. Bates:

On the morning of the 5th [the 90th Pennsylvania] resumed the march, but had not gone far before it came upon the enemy’s skirmishers. The command was formed in line of battle, and advanced until it reached the open ground, beyond which the enemy was entrenched. The line was established behind a slight rise of ground, with small trees and bushes in front, the right of the Ninetieth being separated from the rest of the brigade by a road which it was impossible to occupy, being raked by the enemy’s artillery. ‘We lay,’ [said] a report of the battle, ‘in this position some time, when General Griffin, in command of the First Division, rode up and ordered a charge. Colonel Lyle promptly led his regiment forward, and as soon as it had cleared the shrubbery in front, and emerged upon the open field, rebel batteries opened upon it with grape and canister. The order was given to ‘double quick,’ and with a shout it advanced within close range of the rebel lines. From some misunderstanding, or not having received the same peremptory order from General Griffin that he gave to the Ninetieth, the rest of the brigade did not advance any distance, leaving the regiment entirely alone in the charge. When Colonel Lyle discovered that he was unsupported, he gave the order to ‘about face,’ and what was left rallied around the colors, and under a fierce fire of infantry and artillery returned to its original position…. [O]f two hundred and fifty-one men, one hundred and twenty-four were either killed, wounded, or captured. A ditch run across the field with rebel sharp-shooters, who prevented any of the wounded from being taken off, and they fell into the hands of the enemy.’ The regiment was soon after relieved and moved to the rear.

Reassigned to the 3rd Division of the 5th Corps, the division under General Samuel W. Crawford, Paul's regiment became one of those which fought in the Battle of Cold Harbor (June 1–12) and several other engagements during the Siege of Petersburg (June 9, 1864 – March 25, 1865). Still convalescing from battle wounds sustained in the Wilderness when his regiment was transferred to Company E of the 11th Pennsylvania Infantry (as part of a reorganization ordered by the U.S. War Department which merged the 90th Pennsylvania into the 11th Pennsylvania), Paul was honorably discharged from the army at the Union's South Street Hospital in Philadelphia on February 11, 1865.

== Post-war life ==
Following his honorable discharge from the military, William Paul returned north, and resumed life at home with his parents and younger sister, Ida. In 1870, they resided in Havre de Grace, Maryland, where family patriarch George was employed as a carpenter. During this decade, William began raising chickens and became active in farming.

Residing alone with his parents in Harford County and still employed as a farmer while his father worked as a carpenter during the opening months of 1880, Paul then married Annie Mitchell (1851–1938) in Harford County on June 5 of that same year. Daughters Mary B. and Barbara E. Mitchell were born, respectively, in April 1881 and October 1883.

A resident again of Havre de Grace by the time of the special veterans' census of 1890. Paul made his home Bel Air later that same decade. He was also an active member of his local chapter of the Grand Army of the Republic (Rodgers Post) during this phase of his life.

Once again a resident of Bel Air during the early 1900s, he supported his wife, Annie, and daughters, Mary and Barbara, through business employment as an agent. In 1902, he underwent further surgery to repair the damage which had been done to his body during the Battle of the Wilderness in 1864. According to several reports by The Aegis & Intelligencer newspaper:

”August 15, 1902.... Mr. William H. Paul, of Earlton, who was wounded three times in the battle of the Wilderness in 1864, expects to go to Philadelphia to undergo an operation, which will be performed by his former surgeon Dr. Meers. On Sunday a bone was taken from his arm, which was about one half inch in length. This is the fifteenth piece that has been extracted.

September 5, 1902.... Mr. William H. Paul, of Earlton, recently underwent a painful operation in Philadelphia. He has had a number of dead pieces of bone removed, which were the result of a wound received during the battle of the Wilderness.

Paul's military pension records also confirmed that he had sustained battle injuries while serving with the 90th Pennsylvania Infantry with his U.S. Veterans Administration Pension Payment Card noting specifically that he had been wounded in his right arm and chest. As a result, on May 12, 1890, he was awarded a U.S. Civil War Pension of $24 per month. By 1910, his daughters had moved out of the family home to begin their own lives, leaving Paul and his wife to reside in Harford County as empty nesters. By this time, he had also become a writer for his local newspaper.

== Death ==
William H. Paul died on February 23, 1911. Military records confirmed that he and his wife, Annie, were residents of Havre de Grace Maryland at the time of his death.

== Medal of Honor citation ==
Rank and Organization: Private, Company E, 90th Pennsylvania Infantry. Place and Date: At Antietam, Md., September 17, 1862. Entered Service at: ------. Place of Birth: Philadelphia. Date of Issue: November 3, 1896. Citation:

The President of the United States of America, in the name of Congress, takes pleasure in presenting the Medal of Honor to Private William H. Paul, United States Army, for extraordinary heroism on September 17, 1862, while serving with Company E, 90th Pennsylvania Infantry, in action at Antietam, Maryland. Under a most withering and concentrated fire, Private Paul voluntarily picked up the colors of his regiment, when the bearer and two of the color guards had been killed, and bore them aloft throughout the entire battle.

== See also ==
- List of American Civil War Medal of Honor recipients: M–P
- Maryland in the American Civil War
- Pennsylvania in the American Civil War
- Reconstruction era
