= Nonviolent self-defense =

Self-defence system

Nonviolent self-defense (NSD) is a system of self-protection and humane control developed in the 1970s by Harvard-trained educational psychologist Dr. William Paul (1939–1989).

NSD was devised for use by mental health professionals who dealt with potentially violent psychiatric patients on a daily basis. NSD is a system of integrated self-defense and control skills based on whole-body movement and pliancy. The system features evasion, deflection, dodging, disengagement, and restraint. NSD does not allow any offensive movements (kicking, striking, etc.) other than the use of humane restraint. NSD is now used by mental health, social service, law enforcement, and education professionals throughout the United States for nonviolent crisis intervention.

== See also ==
- Hard and soft (martial arts)
- Nonviolence
- William Wayne Paul
