= Martin E. Scheibner =

American Civil War soldier (1842–1908)

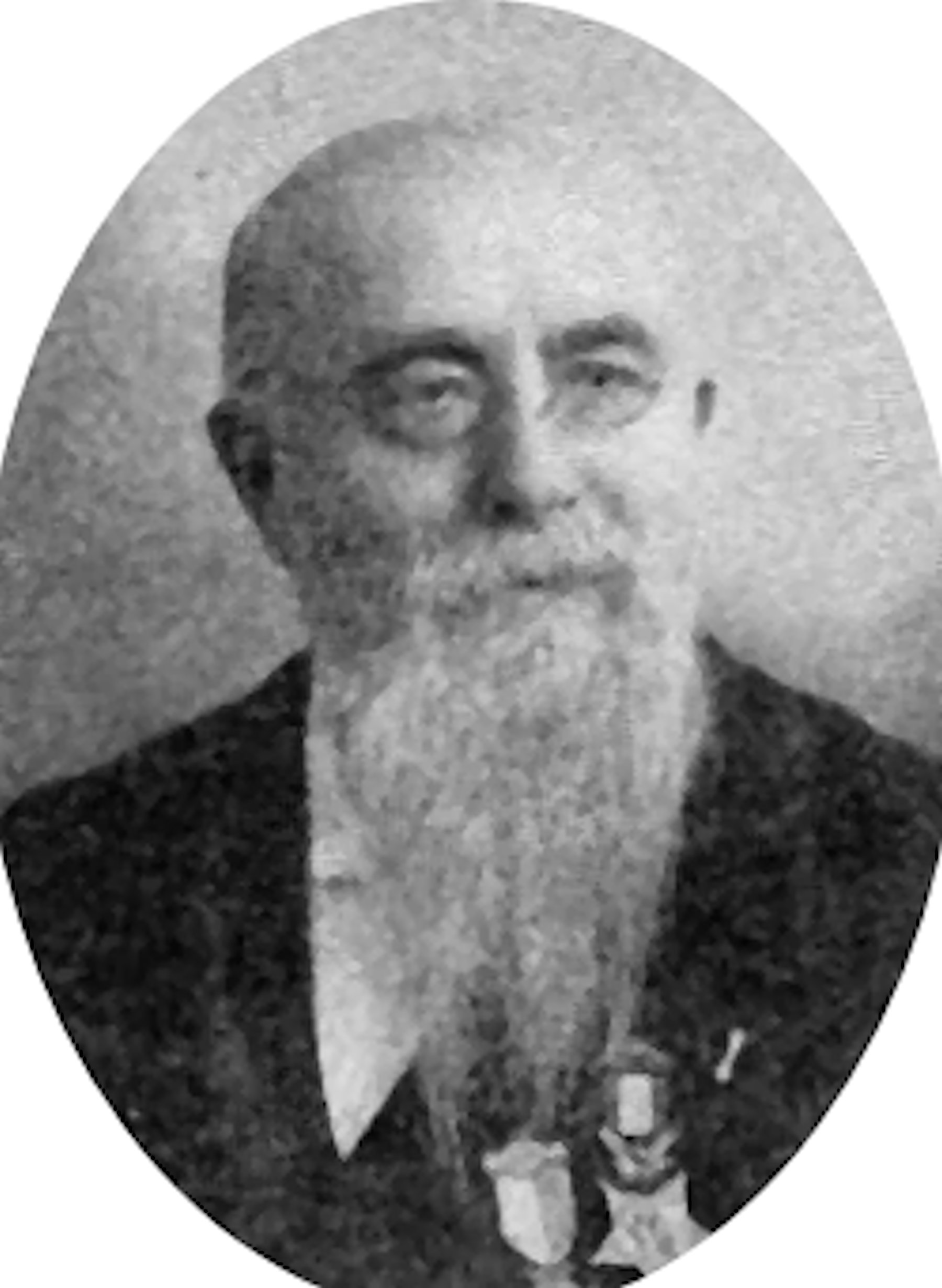
- Born: October 13, 1842; Valday, Novgorod Oblast, Russia
- Died: November 29, 1908 (aged 66); Camden, New Jersey, U.S.
- Burial place: Charles Evans Cemetery; Reading, Pennsylvania, U.S.
- Military career
- Allegiance: United States
- Branch: United States Army; Union Army
- Rank: Private
- Units: Company G, 90th Pennsylvania Infantry
- Conflicts: Battle of Mine Run, Virginia
- Awards: Medal of Honor

Martin E. Scheibner (October 13, 1842 – November 29, 1908) was a Russian-born soldier who fought for the Union Army during the American Civil War. He received the Medal of Honor for valor.

== Biography ==
Scheibner received the Medal of Honor on June 23, 1896, for his actions at the Battle of Mine Run, Virginia, on November 27, 1863, while with Company G of the 90th Pennsylvania Infantry.

== Medal of Honor citation ==
Citation:

The President of the United States of America, in the name of Congress, takes pleasure in presenting the Medal of Honor to Private Martin E. Scheibner, United States Army, for extraordinary heroism on 27 November 1863, while serving with Company G, 90th Pennsylvania Infantry, in action at Mine Run, Virginia. Private Scheibner voluntarily extinguished the burning fuse of a shell which had been thrown into the lines of the regiment by the enemy.

== See also ==
- List of American Civil War Medal of Honor recipients: Q–S
