= Horatio Stockton Howell =

Union Army chaplain in the American Civil War

- Born: August 14, 1820 near Trenton, New Jersey, U.S.
- Died: July 1, 1863 (aged 42); Gettysburg, Pennsylvania, U.S.
- Occupation(s): Presbyterian minister, U.S. Army chaplain
- Spouse: Isabella Grant Howell

Horatio Stockton Howell (August 14, 1820 – July 1, 1863) was a Union Army chaplain killed in downtown Gettysburg on the first day of the Battle of Gettysburg in the American Civil War.

== Career as minister and teacher ==
In 1853 he was called on to serve the Presbyterian Church in the small hamlet of Delaware Water Gap in northeastern Pennsylvania. There he also ran a private school for boys.

== Military career ==
Christ Church served as a Field Hospital

=== Battle of Gettysburg ===
On the first day of the Battle of Gettysburg, July 1, 1863, Confederate forces engaged Union troops to the west of town, near the Lutheran Theological Seminary. Medical personnel of the I Corps selected the College Lutheran Church at #44 Chambersburg Street as a divisional field hospital. (The building is now called Christ Lutheran Church.) A civilian resident of Gettysburg recalled that 140 men were laid in the sanctuary around midday, beds being improvised by laying boards on top of the pews. Limbs were being amputated and thrown out of the church windows, piling up on the ground below.

Late in the afternoon, the Confederates began to push the Union troops back through town. Shortly after 4 o'clock, the overwhelmed First Corps soldiers fell back through the streets of Gettysburg to the heights on Cemetery Ridge and Cemetery Hill south of town. A chaotic scene ensued as jubilant Confederates followed closely on their heels. As the Union retreat swept toward the College Lutheran Church, Chaplain Howell was assisting members of the medical staff inside the building. After hearing shots outside, Howell turned to a nearby surgeon and said, "I will step outside for a moment and see what the trouble is."

Sgt. Archibald Snow followed Howell out of the church door. Later, Snow wrote the most detailed account of what happened:

"I had just had my wound dressed and was leaving through the front door just behind Chaplain Howell, at the same time when the advance skirmishers of the Confederates were coming up the street on a run. Howell, in addition to his shoulder straps & uniform, wore the straight dress sword prescribed in Army Regulations for chaplains... The first skirmisher arrived at the foot of the church steps just as the chaplain and I came out. Placing one foot on the first step the soldier called on the chaplain to surrender; but Howell, instead of throwing up his hands promptly and uttering the usual 'I surrender,' attempted some dignified explanation to the effect that he was a noncombatant and as such was exempt from capture, when a shot from the skirmisher's rifle ended the controversy... The man who fired the shot stood on the exact spot where the memorial tablet has since been erected, and Chaplain Howell, fell upon the landing at the top of the steps."

Howell died at age 42. Following the battle, his remains were shipped to Brooklyn, New York and laid to rest in Green-Wood Cemetery.

== Legacy ==
A monument at the foot of the College Lutheran church steps was dedicated in 1889 to mark the spot where the chaplain was killed. The inscription reads

Monument to Howell on the site of his death

In Memoriam.
Rev. Horatio S. Howell
Chaplain.
90th Penn'a Vols,
was cruelly shot
dead on these
church steps on
the afternoon of

July 1st 1863

Howell was the only chaplain killed at Gettysburg. Bruce Davis, president of the Civil War Roundtable of Gettysburg, notes that he had always thought Howell "something of a fool" for refusing to surrender, but now thinks he may have been "pushed beyond his emotional limits."
