= William Wayne Paul =

American martial artist and activist

William Wayne Paul (December 29,1939– May 29,1989) was an American martial artist, educator, psychologist and social/political activist.

Born in Nevada County, California, Bill Paul lived in three group homes and attended four high schools during adolescence. He began his study of judo with Richard Takemoto in Oakland, continuing with Mits Kimura at the San Francisco Judo Institute from 1957 and competing successfully in numerous judo tournaments during the later 1950s and early 1960s. Between 1962 and 1964 he worked as a bouncer at Pierre's Bar in San Francisco's North Beach area. Having spent time training in Japan, in late 1964 he was an alternate on the US Olympic judo team, and he captained the US team at the Pan American Games in Winnipeg during 1967. Thereafter he largely switched to the study of the Chinese martial arts, especially tai chi.

It was also during the late 1960s that Paul became politically active. A keen photographer, he documented clashes between police and student protesters during the unrest at the San Francisco State University and was later reported to have defended Vietnam War protesters from assaults by angry onlookers during peace marches in San Francisco. Although a self-avowed pacifist with regards to violence as an instrument of state policy, he was notably drawn to interpersonal conflicts and he continued to work as a bouncer at several gay bars in San Francisco.

Paul received a Master's Degree from San Francisco State University in 1974 and then a Doctorate of Education degree from Harvard University. His thesis was on the use of humane, nonviolent self defense, especially for workers in psychiatric institutions; a development of the self defense methods that he had taught to university students, gay activists and women's rights groups. He continued to refine this system, which combined elements of Chinese and Japanese martial arts with conflict de-escalation and resolution techniques, for the remainder of his life, eventually producing a VHS video guide for instructors in the system.

During the 1980s Paul became increasingly politically active as an advocate of gay rights. He was a member of the Stonewall Democrats and took part in numerous protests, including being instrumental in the November 27, 1985 protest that inspired the NAMES Project AIDS Memorial Quilt. He was also a vocal supporter of the Gay Games.

He died in San Francisco, California in 1989 due to a brain tumor associated with HIV.
