= William Paul (Utah architect) =

American architect

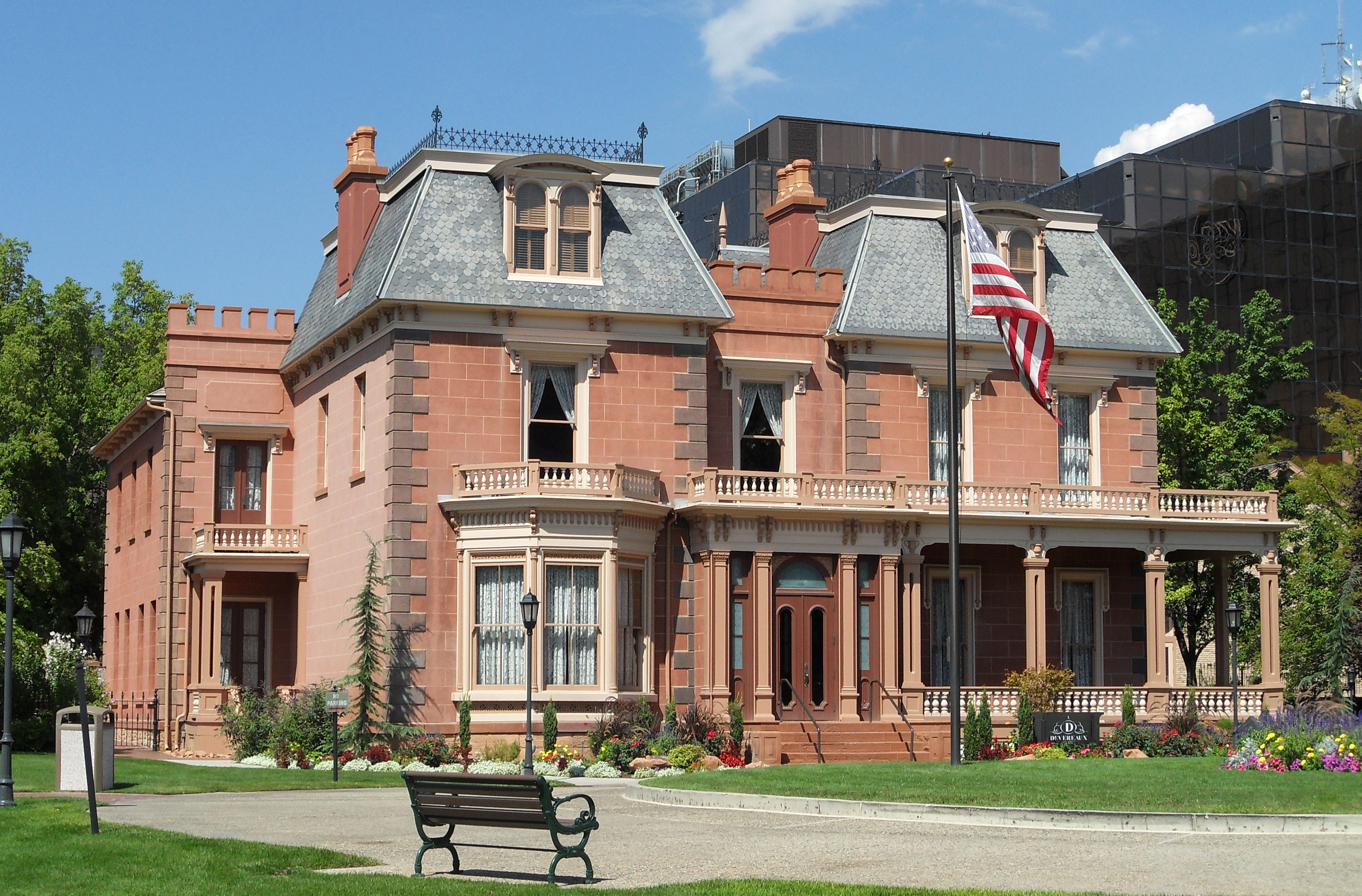
Devereaux House (Salt Lake City, Utah)

William Paul (May 2, 1803, in St. Agnes, Cornwall, England – February 3, 1889 in Salt Lake City, Utah) was an architect in Utah.

His Devereaux House, at 334 W. South Temple St. Salt Lake City, UT, is listed on the U.S. National Register of Historic Places.
