= First Battle of Rappahannock Station =

Battle of the American Civil War

Coordinates: 38.5272°N 77.8302°W

- Part of the American Civil War
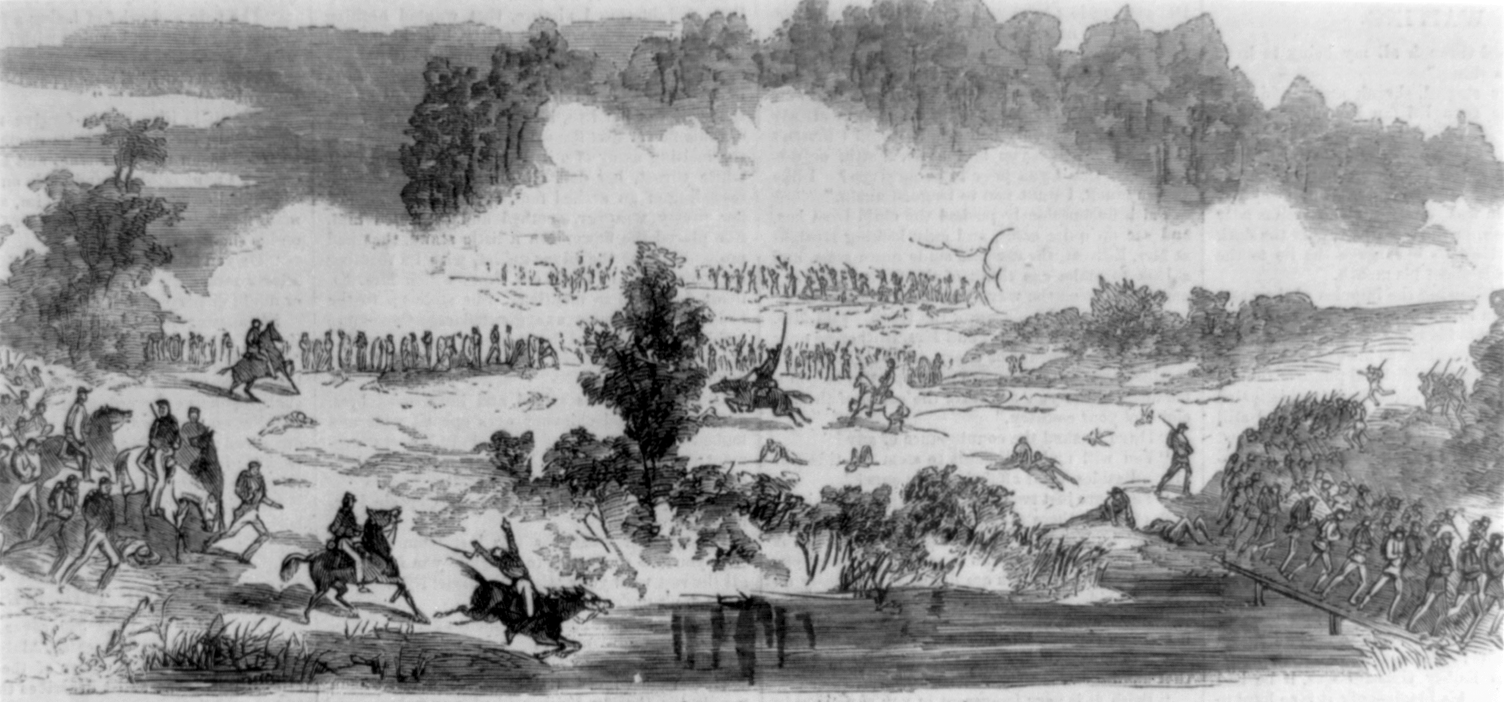
- Skirmish at Freeman's Ford, by Davenport.
Date	August 22, 1862 – August 25, 1862
Location	Culpeper County and Fauquier County, Virginia
Result	Confederate Victory

Belligerents
United States (Union)	(Confederate States of America) CSA (Confederacy)

Commanders and leaders
John Pope	James Longstreet

Strength
Brigades	Brigades

Casualties and losses
- 225

The First Battle of Rappahannock Station, (also known as Waterloo Bridge, White Sulphur Springs, Lee Springs, and Freeman's Ford) as took place on August 23, 1862, at present-day Remington, Virginia, as part of the Northern Virginia Campaign of the American Civil War.

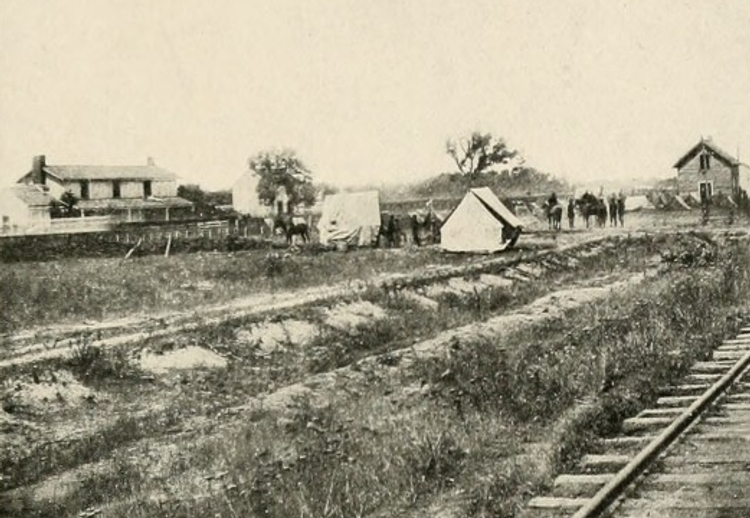
Union pickets at Rappahannock Station, Virginia photographed here in August 1862 will be driven away by Confederates under James Longstreet

== Background ==
In early August, Confederate Gen. Robert E. Lee determined that Union Maj. Gen. George B. McClellan's army was being withdrawn from the Virginia Peninsula to reinforce Maj. Gen. John Pope. He sent Maj. Gen. James Longstreet's wing from Richmond to join Thomas J. "Stonewall" Jackson's wing of the army near Gordonsville and arrived to take command himself on August 15. On August 20 and 21, Pope withdrew to the line of the Rappahannock River.

== Skirmishes ==
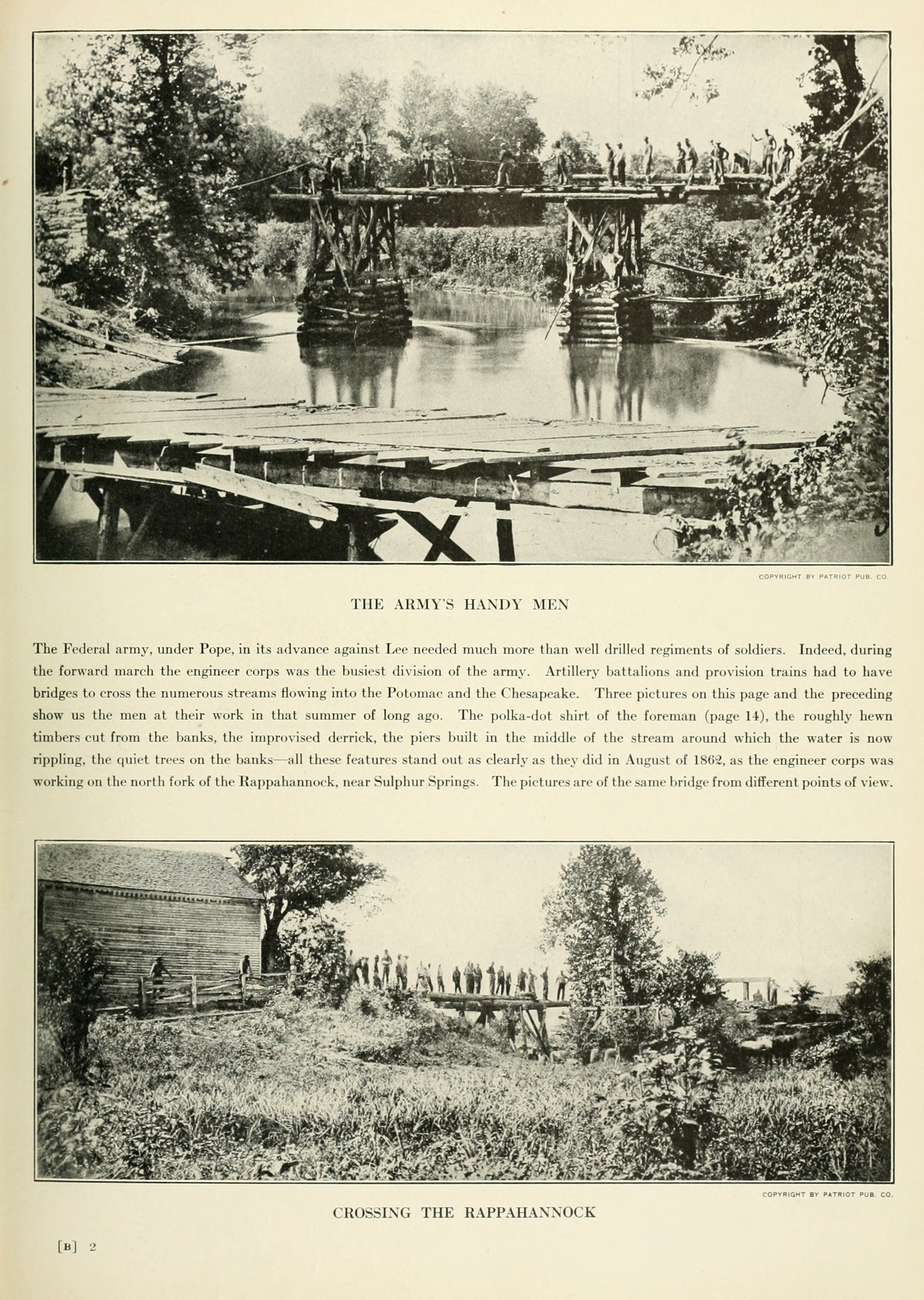
Union troops crossing the Rappahannock near Sulphur Springs

Throughout the day on August 20, Pope spread his army along the northern bank of the Rappahannock from Kelly's Ford northward to just above the railroad bridge at Rappahannock Station (present day Remington, Virginia) and prepared to defend the river crossings. On that day the head of Longstreet's right wing of Lee's army reached Kelly's Ford. Lee had intended to cross the river above Pope's army to flank it but Pope was expanding northward too quickly. On August 21 and 22 the northern ends of the two armies "waltzed", first Pope and then Longstreet expanding northward along the river. Each army kept its southern end anchored at Kelly's Ford. Lee then changed his strategy and ordered Jackson's left wing to move much further upriver in order to cross above Pope. On August 23, Maj. Gen. J.E.B. Stuart's cavalry crossed the Rappahannock at the northern end of Jackson's line and made a daring raid on Pope's headquarters at Catlett Station, thus showing that the Union right flank was vulnerable to a turning movement.

== Rappahannock Station ==
Lee now needed to protect his own right flank from a possible enemy attack. Upriver storms on August 22 had caused the river to rise enough to make most of the fords useless, but Lee needed to take the railroad bridge at Rappahannock Station, where Union artillery on the high northern bank plus a small troop and gun emplacement on the south bank controlled the crossing. On the afternoon of August 22, two Confederate artillery units arrived around Rappahannock Station. They were under orders from Maj. Gen. James Longstreet to drive the enemy from his positions on both sides of the river. Nathan G. Evans' South Carolina Brigade and George T. Anderson's Georgia Brigade were ordered to support the artillery. At daylight on the 23rd, the 19 guns of the Washington Artillery of New Orleans began the duel. One historian characterized this three-hour action involving nearly fifty cannon as "one of the fiercest small artillery duels of the war". The first Confederate artillery target was the small Union battery on the knoll just south of the river. This position was an easy target for the artillery of both armies. It was quickly abandoned by Union forces, who blew up the railroad bridge as they retreated. Evans then sent his small Macbeth Artillery battery and the Holcombe Legion infantry to occupy the knoll, but they were quickly dislodged by Union artillery fire from across the river. About noon some of the Union artillery units on the north bank moved slightly upriver to be able to fire on the bottomland where the Confederate infantry brigades were concealed. The Confederate infantry retreated under fire as best they could, but they suffered substantial casualties. At mid-afternoon additional Confederate artillery units arrived to shell the Union forces, which then set fire to the buildings in the small town and retreated. On August 25 Jackson's wing rose at 3 am to begin marching further upriver to cross the Rappahannock at Hinson's Mill Ford, flanking Pope on his right. On the 26th he marched via Thoroughfare Gap to capture Bristoe Station and destroy Federal supplies at Manassas Junction, far in the rear of Pope's army. A few days later Longstreet's wing of the Army of Northern Virginia followed the same route to join Jackson's wing, setting the stage for the Second Battle of Manassas.

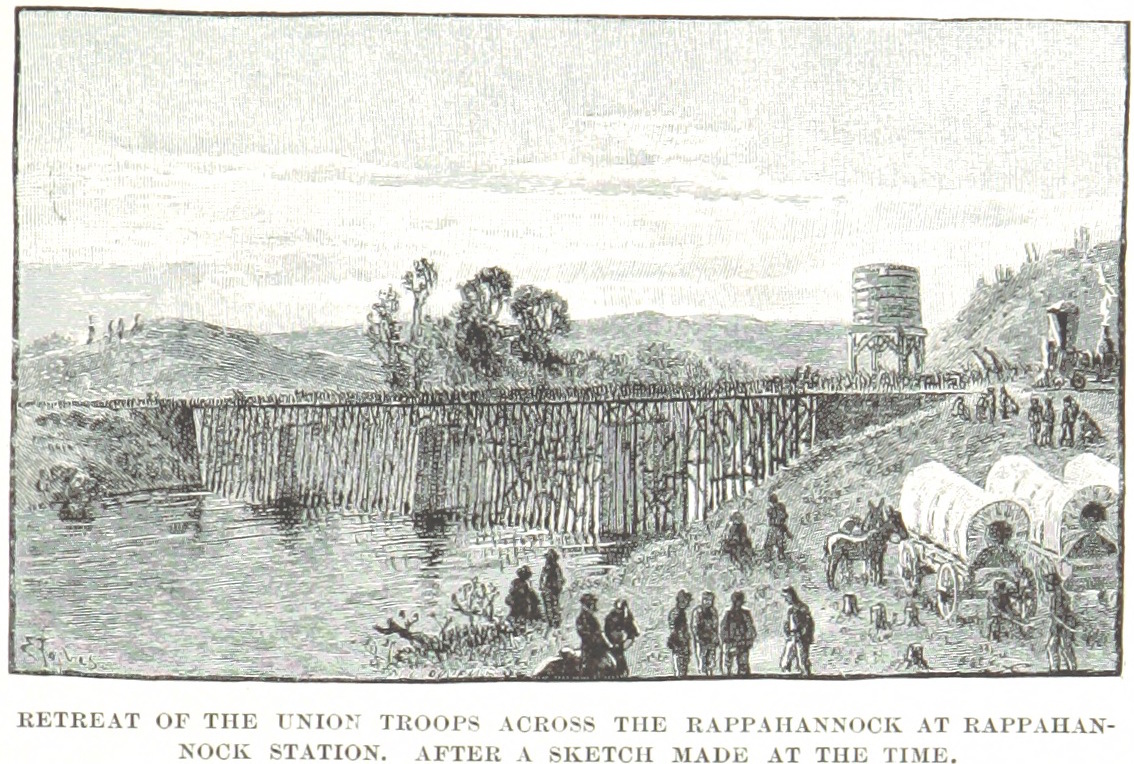
Union forces retreat from Rappahannock Station

== Reinterment of a soldier ==
A Smithsonian Institution archaeological team uncovered the remains of a Confederate soldier in 1989 while excavating the ruins of St. James Episcopal Church to assess the site's eligibility for the National Register of Historic Places. The team identified the soldier as a native of New Orleans and member of the Washington Artillery killed during the Battle of Rappahannock Station on August 23, 1862. The reinterment of the soldier was conducted at the St. James Cemetery, Brandy Station, Virginia.

== Battlefield preservation ==
The American Battlefield Trust and its partners have acquired and preserved 869 acres (3.52 km^{2}) of the battlefield through November 2021. It is located along the Rappahannock River at Remington, Va., and features visible earthworks as well as bridge and mill ruins.

== See also ==
- Second Battle of Rappahannock Station
