= List of American Civil War Medal of Honor recipients: G–L =

This is a complete alphabetical list (G to L) of Medal of Honor recipients during the Civil War. Many of the awards during the Civil War were for capturing or saving regimental flags. During the Civil War, regimental flags served as the rallying point for the unit, and guided the unit's movements. Loss of the flag could greatly disrupt a unit, and could have a greater effect than the death of the commanding officer.

== Medal of Honor ==
The Medal of Honor is the highest military decoration awarded by the United States government and is bestowed on a member of the United States armed forces who distinguishes himself "...conspicuously by gallantry and intrepidity at the risk of his life above and beyond the call of duty while engaged in an action against an enemy of the United States..." Due to the nature of this medal, it is commonly presented posthumously.

== G ==
This along with the *, indicates that the Medal of Honor was awarded posthumously

Image	Name	Service	Rank	Unit/Command	Place of action	Date of action	Notes
—	Richard J. Gage	Army	Private	Company D, 104th Illinois Volunteer Infantry Regiment	Elk River, Tennessee	July 2, 1863	For extraordinary heroism on 2 July 1863, in action at Elk River, Tennessee. Private Gage voluntarily joined a small party that, under a heavy fire, captured a stockade and saved the bridge.
—	George N. Galloway	Army	Private	Company G, 95th Pennsylvania Volunteer Infantry Regiment	Alsops Farm, Virginia	May 8, 1864	For extraordinary heroism on 8 May 1864, in action at Alsops Farm, Virginia. Private Galloway voluntarily held an important position under heavy fire.
—	John Galloway	Army	Commissary Sergeant	8th Pennsylvania Cavalry Regiment	Farmville, Virginia	Apr 7, 1865	For extraordinary heroism on 7 April 1865, in action at Farmville, Virginia. His regiment being surprised and nearly overwhelmed, Commissary Sergeant Galloway dashed forward under a heavy fire, reached the right of the regiment, where the danger was greatest, rallied the men and prevented a disaster that was imminent.
An older, balding black man with mustache, wearing a double-breasted suit and striped bow tie. He is sitting in a chair holding an open book in his left hand.	James D. Gardiner	Army	Private	36th Regiment United States Colored Troops	Battle of Chaffin's Farm, Virginia	Sep 29, 1864	Last name sometimes spelled "Gardner." For extraordinary heroism on 29 September 1864, in action at Chapin's Farm, Virginia. Private Gardiner rushed in advance of his brigade, shot a rebel officer who was on the parapet rallying his men, and then ran him through with his bayonet.
—	Charles N. Gardner	Army	Private	Company E, 32nd Massachusetts Volunteer Infantry Regiment	Battle of Five Forks, Virginia	Apr 1, 1865	For extraordinary heroism on 1 April 1865, in action at Five Forks, Virginia, for capture of flag.
—	Robert J. Gardner	Army	Sergeant	Company K, 34th Massachusetts Volunteer Infantry Regiment	Third Battle of Petersburg, Virginia	Apr 2, 1865	Was among the first to enter Fort Gregg, clearing his way by using his musket on the heads of the enemy.
Medal of Honor winner William Gardner	William Gardner	Navy	Seaman	(United States Navy) USS Galena	Aboard USS Galena, Battle of Mobile Bay	August 5, 1864	For extraordinary heroism in action, serving as Seaman on board the USS Galena in the engagement at Mobile Bay, 5 August 1864. Serving gallantly during this fierce battle which resulted in the capture of the rebel ram Tennessee and the damaging of Fort Morga, Seaman Gardner behaved with conspicuous coolness under the fire of the enemy.
—	William Garrett	Army	Sergeant	Company G, 41st Ohio Volunteer Infantry Regiment	Battle of Nashville, Tennessee	Dec 16, 1864	For extraordinary heroism on 16 December 1864, in action at Nashville, Tennessee. With several companions Sergeant Garrett dashed forward, the first to enter the enemy's works, taking possession of four pieces of artillery and captured the flag of the 13th Mississippi Infantry (Confederate States of America).
—	James R. Garrison	Navy	Coal Heaver	(United States Navy) USS Hartford	Aboard USS Hartford, Battle of Mobile Bay	August 5, 1864	for extraordinary heroism in action while serving on board the flagship, USS Hartford, during successful engagements against Fort Morgan, rebel gunboats and the ram Tennessee in Mobile Bay, Alabama, on 5 August 1864. When a shell struck his foot and severed one of his toes, Coal Heaver Garrison remained at his station at the shell whip and, after crudely bandaging the wound, continued to perform his duties until severely wounded by another shellburst.
Medal of Honor winner William Garvin	William Garvin	Navy	Captain of the Forecastle	(United States Navy) USS Agawam	Aboard USS Agawam, First Battle of Fort Fisher	December 23, 1864	For extraordinary heroism in action while serving on board the USS Agawam, as one of a volunteer crew of a powder boat which was exploded near Fort Fisher, North Carolina, 23 December 1864. The powder boat, towed in by the USS Wilderness to prevent detection by the enemy, cast off and slowly steamed to within 300 yards of the beach. After fuses and fires had been lit and a second anchor with short scope let go to assure the boat's tailing inshore, the crew again boarded the Wilderness and proceeded a distance of 12 miles from shore. Less than two hours later the explosion took place, and the following day fires were observed still burning at the fort.
—	Richard Gasson*	Army	Sergeant	(New York (state)) Company K, 47th New York Infantry	Battle of Chaffin's Farm, Virginia	Sep 29, 1864	For extraordinary heroism on 29 September 1864, in action at Chapin's Farm, Virginia. Sergeant Gasson fell dead while planting the colors of his regiment on the enemy's works.
Medal of Honor winner John C Gaunt	John C. Gaunt	Army	Private	Company H, 104th Ohio Volunteer Infantry Regiment	Battle of Franklin, Tennessee	Nov 30, 1864	For extraordinary heroism on 30 November 1864, in action at Franklin, Tennessee, for capture of flag.
	Isaac Gause	Army	Corporal	Company E, 2nd Ohio Volunteer Cavalry Regiment	near Berryville, Virginia	Sep 13, 1864	For extraordinary heroism on 13 September 1864, in action at Berryville, Virginia, for capture of the colors of the 8th South Carolina Infantry while engaged in a reconnaissance along the Berryville and Winchester Pike.
—	Levi B. Gaylord	Army	Sergeant	Company A, 29th Massachusetts Volunteer Infantry Regiment	Battle of Fort Stedman, Virginia	Mar 25, 1865	For extraordinary heroism on 25 March 1865, in action at Fort Stedman, Virginia. Sergeant Gaylord voluntarily assisted in working an abandoned gun, while exposed to heavy fire, until the enemy's advancing line was routed by a charge on its left flank.
Medal of Honor winner Daniel G. George alias William Smith	Daniel G. George	Navy	Ordinary Seaman	(United States Navy) Picket Boat No. 1	Aboard U.S. Picket Boat No. 1	October 27, 1864	For extraordinary heroism in action while serving on board U.S. Picket Boat No. 1, in action near Plymouth, North Carolina, 27 October 1864, against the Confederate ram, Albemarle, which had resisted repeated attacks by our steamers and had kept a large force of vessels employed in watching her. The picket boat, equipped with a spar torpedo, succeeded in passing the enemy pickets within 20 yards without being discovered and then made for the Albemarle under a full head of steam. Immediately taken under fire by the ram, the small boat plunged on, jumped the log boom which encircled the target and exploded its torpedo under the port bow of the ram. The picket boat was destroyed by enemy fire and almost the entire crew taken prisoner or lost. (Daniel George's TRUE name was William Smith)
Medal of Honor winner Thomas Parke Gere	Thomas P. Gere	Army	First Lieutenant and Adjutant	5th Minnesota Volunteer Infantry Regiment	Battle of Nashville, Tennessee	Dec 16, 1864	For extraordinary heroism on 16 December 1864, in action at Nashville, Tennessee, for capture of flag of 4th Mississippi (Confederate States of America).
—	Nicholas Geschwind	Army	Captain	116th Illinois Volunteer Infantry Regiment	Battle of Vicksburg, Mississippi	May 22, 1863	For gallantry in the charge of the volunteer storming party on 22 May 1863, in action at Vicksburg, Mississippi.
Medal of Honor winner Wesley Gibbs	Wesley Gibbs	Army	Sergeant	2nd Connecticut Heavy Artillery Regiment	Third Battle of Petersburg, Virginia	Apr 2, 1865	For extraordinary heroism on 2 April 1865, in action at Petersburg, Virginia, for capture of flag.
—	Benjamin Gifford	Army	Private	(New York (state)) Company H, 121st New York Volunteer Infantry	Battle of Sayler's Creek, Virginia	Apr 6, 1865	For extraordinary heroism on 6 April 1865, in action at Deatonsville (Sailor's Creek), Virginia, for capture of flag.
Medal of Honor winner David Lewis Gifford	David L. Gifford	Army	Private	Company B, 4th Massachusetts Volunteer Cavalry	Ashepoo River, South Carolina	May 24, 1864	Volunteered as a member of a boat crew which went to the rescue of a large number of Union soldiers on board the stranded steamer Boston and with great gallantry assisted in conveying them to shore, being exposed during the entire time to a heavy fire from a Confederate battery.
—	Frank S. Gile	Navy	Landsman	(United States Navy) USS Lehigh	Aboard USS Lehigh, Charleston Harbor	November 16, 1863	Ffor extraordinary heroism in action while serving on board the USS Lehigh, Charleston Harbor, South Carolina, 16 November 1863, during the hazardous task of freeing the Lehigh, which had been grounded, and was under heavy enemy fire from Fort Moultrie. After several previous attempts had been made, Landsman Gile succeeded in passing in a small boat from the Lehigh to the USS Nahant with a line bent on a hawser. This courageous action while under severe enemy fire enabled the Lehigh to be freed from her helpless position.
An older white man with Van Dyke mustache and beard wearing an ornate military jacket with fringe at the shoulders, a wide sash across the chest, and a medal hanging from his neck.	George L. Gillespie	Army	First Lieutenant	(United States) U.S. Army Corps of Engineers	near Bethesda Church, Virginia	May 31, 1864	For extraordinary heroism on 31 May 1864, while serving with the Engineer Corps, in action at Bethesda Church, Virginia, in exposed himself to great danger by voluntarily making his way through the enemy's lines to communicate with General Sheridan. While rendering this service First Lieutenant Gillespie was captured, but escaped; again came in contact with the enemy, was again ordered to surrender, but escaped by dashing away under fire.
Medal of Honor winner Edward Lyons Gilligan	Edward L. Gilligan	Army	First Sergeant	Company E, 88th Pennsylvania Volunteer Infantry Regiment	Battle of Gettysburg, Pennsylvania	Jul 1, 1863	For extraordinary heroism on 1 July 1863, in action at Gettysburg, Pennsylvania. First Sergeant Gilligan assisted in the capture of a Confederate flag by knocking down the color sergeant.
Medal of Honor winner John Curtis Gilmore	John C. Gilmore	Army	Major	(New York (state)) 16th New York Volunteer Infantry Regiment	Salem Heights, Virginia	May 3, 1863	For extraordinary heroism on 3 May 1863, while serving with 16th New York Infantry, in action at Salem Heights, Fredericksburg, Virginia. Major Gilmore seized the colors of his regiment and gallantly rallied his men under a very severe fire.
—	Patrick Ginley	Army	Private	(New York (state)) Battery G, 1st Battalion, New York Volunteer Light Artillery ("Brickel's German Light Artillery")	Reams Station, Virginia	Aug 25, 1864	For extraordinary heroism on 25 August 1864, in action at Reams' Station, Virginia. The command having been driven from the works, Private Ginley, having been left alone between the opposing lines, crept back into the works, put three charges of canister in one of the guns, and fired the piece directly into a body of the enemy about to seize the works; he then rejoined his command, took the colors, and ran toward the enemy, followed by the command, which recaptured the works and guns.
—	Joseph Gion	Army	Private	(New York (state)) 74th New York Volunteer Infantry Regiment	Battle of Chancellorsville, Virginia	May 2, 1863	For extraordinary heroism on 2 May 1863, in action at Chancellorsville, Virginia. Voluntarily and under heavy fire, Private Gion advanced toward the enemy's lines and secured valuable information.
—	Leonidas M. Godley	Army	First Sergeant	Company E, 22nd Iowa Volunteer Infantry Regiment	Battle of Vicksburg, Mississippi	May 22, 1863	For extraordinary heroism on 22 May 1863, in action at Vicksburg, Mississippi. First Sergeant Godley led his company in the assault on the enemy's works and gained the parapet, there receiving three very severe wounds. He lay all day in the sun, was taken prisoner, and had his leg amputated without anesthetics.
Medal of Honor winner Philip Goettel	Philip Goettel	Army	Private	(New York (state)) Company B, 149th New York Volunteer Infantry Regiment	Ringgold, Georgia	Nov 27, 1863	For extraordinary heroism on 24 November 1863, in action at Lookout Mountain, Tennessee, for capture of flag and battery guidon.
—	Charles A. Goheen	Army	Sergeant	(New York (state)) Company G, 8th New York Volunteer Cavalry Regiment	Battle of Waynesboro, Virginia	Mar 2, 1865	For extraordinary heroism of First Sergeant Goheen, on 2 March 1865, in action at Waynesboro, Virginia, for capture of flag.
Medal of Honor winner Andrew E Goldsbery	Andrew E. Goldsbery	Army	Private	Company E, 127th Illinois Volunteer Infantry Regiment	Battle of Vicksburg, Mississippi	May 22, 1863	For gallantry in the charge of the volunteer storming party on 22 May 1863, in action at Vicksburg, Mississippi.
Medal of Honor winner Francis Henry Goodall	Francis H. Goodall	Army	Sergeant	Company G, 11th New Hampshire Volunteer Infantry	Battle of Fredericksburg, Virginia	Dec 13, 1862	for extraordinary heroism on 13 December 1862, in action at Fredericksburg, Virginia. With the assistance of another soldier First Sergeant Goodall brought a wounded comrade into the lines, under heavy fire.
—	William E. Goodman	Army	First Lieutenant	Company D, 147th Pennsylvania Infantry	Battle of Chancellorsville, Virginia	May 3, 1863	For extraordinary heroism on 3 May 1863, in action at Chancellorsville, Virginia. First Lieutenant Goodman rescued the colors of the 107th Ohio Volunteers from the enemy.
Medal of Honor winner Edwin Goodrich	Edwin Goodrich	Army	First Lieutenant	(New York (state)) Company D, 9th New York Volunteer Cavalry Regiment	near Cedar Creek, Virginia	Nov 1864	For extraordinary heroism in November 1864, in action at Cedar Creek, Virginia. While the command was falling back, First Lieutenant Goodrich returned, and in the face of the enemy rescued a sergeant from under his fallen horse
Medal of Honor winner Charles Gilbert Gould	Charles G. Gould	Army	Captain	Company H, 5th Vermont Volunteer Infantry Regiment	Third Battle of Petersburg, Virginia	Apr 2, 1865	For extraordinary heroism on 2 April 1865, in action at Petersburg, Virginia. Among the first to mount the enemy's works in the assault, Captain Gould received a serious bayonet wound in the face, was struck several times with clubbed muskets, but bravely stood his ground, and with his sword killed the man who bayoneted him.
Medal of Honor winner Newton Thomas Gould	Newton T. Gould	Army	Private	Company G, 113th Illinois Volunteer Infantry Regiment	Battle of Vicksburg, Mississippi	May 22, 1863	For gallantry in the charge of the volunteer storming party on 22 May 1863, in action at Vicksburg, Mississippi.
	George E. Gouraud	Army	Captain and aide-de-camp	(United States) U.S. Volunteers Division	Honey Hill, South Carolina	Nov 30, 1864	For extraordinary heroism on 30 November 1864, in action at Honey Hill, South Carolina. While under severe fire of the enemy, which drove back the command, Captain Gouraud rendered valuable assistance in rallying the men.
Medal of Honor winner Peter Grace	Peter Grace	Army	Sergeant	Company G, 83rd Pennsylvania Volunteer Infantry Regiment	Battle of the Wilderness, Virginia	May 5, 1864	for extraordinary heroism on 5 May 1864, in action during the Wilderness Campaign, Virginia. Single-handed, Sergeant Grace rescued a comrade from two Confederate guards, knocking down one and compelling surrender of the other.
—	Robert Graham	Navy	Landsman	(United States Navy) USS Tacony	Aboard USS Tacony	October 31, 1864	For extraordinary heroism in action while serving on board USS USS Tacony during the taking of Plymouth, North Carolina, 31 October 1864. Carrying out his duties faithfully during the capture of Plymouth, Graham distinguished himself by a display of coolness when he participated in landing and spiking a 9-inch gun while under a devastating fire from enemy musketry.
Medal of Honor winner Thomas N Graham	Thomas N. Graham	Army	Second Lieutenant	Company G, 15th Regiment Indiana Volunteer Infantry	Battle of Missionary Ridge, Tennessee	Nov 25, 1863	For extraordinary heroism on 25 November 1863, in action at Missionary Ridge, Tennessee. Second Lieutenant Graham seized the colors from the Color Bearer, who had been wounded, and, exposed to a terrible fire, carried them forward, planting them on the enemy's breastworks.
	Gabriel Grant	Army	Surgeon	(United States) 3rd Brigade, 1st Division, II Corps	Battle of Seven Pines, Virginia	Jun 1, 1862	for extraordinary heroism on 1 June 1862, while serving with U.S. Volunteers, in action at Fair Oaks, Virginia. Surgeon Grant removed severely wounded officers and soldiers from the field while under a heavy fire from the enemy, exposing himself beyond the call of duty, thus furnishing an example of most distinguished gallantry.
Head and torso of a white man with bushy sideburns connecting to his mustache, wearing a plain double-breasted military jacket.	Lewis A. Grant	Army	Colonel	5th Vermont Infantry, 1st Vermont Brigade	Battle of Salem Church, Virginia	May 3, 1863	For extraordinary heroism on 3 May 1863, in action at Salem Heights, Virginia. Colonel Grant displayed personal gallantry and intrepidity in the management of his brigade and in leading it in the assault in which he was wounded.
Medal of Honor winner William L Graul	William Graul	Army	Corporal	Company I, 188th Pennsylvania Volunteer Infantry Regiment	Fort Harrison, Battle of Chaffin's Farm, Virginia	Sep 29, 1864	For extraordinary heroism on 29 September 1864, in action at Fort Harrison, Virginia. Corporal Graul was first to plant the colors of his State on the fortifications.
—	John Gray	Army	Private	Company B, 5th Ohio Volunteer Infantry Regiment	Port Republic, Virginia	Jun 9, 1862	For extraordinary heroism on 9 June 1862, in action at Port Republic, Virginia. Private Gray mounted an artillery horse of the enemy and captured a brass 6-pound piece in the face of the enemy's fire and brought it to the rear.
Medal of Honor winner Robert A Gray	Robert A. Gray	Army	Sergeant	Company C, 21st Connecticut Volunteer Infantry Regiment	Battle of Drewry's Bluff, Virginia	May 16, 1864	for extraordinary heroism on 16 May 1864, in action at Drewry's Bluff, Virginia. While retreating with his regiment, which had been repulsed, Sergeant Gray voluntarily returned, in face of the enemy's fire, to a former position and rescued a wounded officer of his company who was unable to walk.
Medal of Honor winner M. R. William Grebe	M. R. William Grebe	Army	Captain	Company F, 4th Missouri Volunteer Cavalry Regiment	Battle of Jonesborough, Georgia	Aug 31, 1864	For extraordinary heroism on 31 August 1864, in action at Jonesboro, Georgia. While acting as aide and carrying orders across a most dangerous part of the battlefield, being hindered by a Confederate advance, Captain Grebe seized a rifle, took a place in the ranks and was conspicuous in repulsing the enemy.
Medal of Honor winner George Green	George Green	Army	Corporal	Company H, 11th Ohio Volunteer Infantry Regiment	Battle of Missionary Ridge, Tennessee	Nov 25, 1863	For extraordinary heroism on 25 November 1863, in action at Missionary Ridge, Tennessee. Corporal Green scaled the enemy's works and in a hand-to-hand fight helped capture the flag of the 18th Alabama Infantry (Confederate States of America).
Abraham Greenawalt	Abraham Greenawalt	Army	Private	Company G, 104th Ohio Volunteer Infantry Regiment	Battle of Franklin, Tennessee	Nov 30, 1864	For extraordinary heroism on 30 November 1864, in action at Franklin, Tennessee, for capture of Corps Headquarters flag (Confederate States of America).
—	John Greene	Navy	Captain of the Forecastle	(United States Navy) USS Varuna	Aboard USS Varuna, Battle of Forts Jackson and St. Philip	April 24, 1862	For extraordinary heroism in action, serving as Captain of a gun on board the USS Varuna during the attacks on Forts Jackson and St. Philip, Louisiana, and while under fire and ramming by the rebel ship Morgan, 24 April 1862. During this action at extremely close range while his ship was under furious fire and twice rammed by the rebel ship Morgan, Captain of the Forecastle Greene remained steadfast at his gun throughout the thickest of the fight and was instrumental in inflicting damage on the enemy until the Varuna, badly damaged and forced to beach, was finally sunk.
Head of a white man with brown hair, mustache, and beard, wearing a blue military jacket with two columns of gold buttons down the chest. The portrait is in a golden oval-shaped frame.	Oliver D. Greene	Army	Major and Assistant Adjutant General	(United States) VI Corps	Battle of Antietam, Maryland	Sep 17, 1862	For extraordinary heroism on 17 September 1862, in action at Antietam, Maryland. Major Greene formed the columns under heavy fire and put them into position.
Medal of Honor winner Joseph Olds Gregg	Joseph O. Gregg	Army	Private	Company F, 133rd Ohio Infantry	near the Richmond & Petersburg Ry., Virginia	Jun 16, 1864	For extraordinary heroism on 16 June 1864, in action at Richmond & Petersburg Railway, Virginia. Private Gregg voluntarily returned to the breastworks which his regiment had been forced to abandon to notify three missing companies that the regiment was falling back; found the enemy already in the works, refused a demand to surrender, returning to his command under a concentrated fire, several bullets passing through his hat and clothing.
—	Theodore W. Greig	Army	Second Lieutenant	(New York (state)) Company C, 61st New York Volunteer Infantry Regiment	Battle of Antietam, Maryland	Sep 17, 1862	For extraordinary heroism on 17 September 1862, in action at Antietam, Maryland. A Confederate regiment, the 4th Alabama Infantry (Confederate States of America), having planted its battle flag slightly in advance of the regiment, Second Lieutenant Greig rushed forward and seized it, and, although shot through the neck, retained the flag and brought it within the Union lines.
	Ignatz Gresser	Army	Corporal	Company D, 128th Pennsylvania Volunteer Infantry Regiment	Battle of Antietam, Maryland	Sep 17, 1862	For extraordinary heroism on 17 September 1862, in action at Antietam, Maryland. While exposed to the fire of the enemy, Corporal Gresser carried from the field a wounded comrade, William Henry Sowden.
—	James H. Gribben	Army	First Lieutenant	(New York (state)) Company C, 2nd New York Volunteer Cavalry Regiment	Battle of Sayler's Creek, Virginia	Apr 6, 1865	For extraordinary heroism on 6 April 1865, in action at Deatonsville (Sailor's Creek), Virginia, for capture of flag of 12th Virginia Infantry (C.S.A.).
—	John Griffiths	Navy	Captain of the Forecastle	(United States Navy) USS Santiago de Cuba	USS Santiago de Cuba Landing Party, Second Battle of Fort Fisher	January 15, 1865	For extraordinary heroism in action while serving on board the USS Santiago de Cuba during the assault on Fort Fisher, North Carolina, on 15 January 1865. As one of a boat crew detailed to one of the generals on shore, Captain of the Forecastle Griffiths bravely entered the fort in the assault and accompanied his party in carrying dispatches at the height of the battle. He was one of six men who entered the fort in the assault from the fleet.
—	Samuel Grimshaw	Army	Private	Company B, 52nd Ohio Volunteer Infantry Regiment	Atlanta. Georgia	Aug 6, 1864	For extraordinary heroism on 6 August 1864, in action at Atlanta, Georgia. Private Grimshaw saved the lives of some of his comrades, and greatly imperiled his own by picking up and throwing away a lighted shell which had fallen in the midst of the company.
Head of a white man with wavy hair and a beard but no mustache, wearing a stiff-collard jacket.	James G. Grindlay	Army	Colonel	(New York (state)) 146th New York Volunteer Infantry Regiment	Battle of Five Forks, Virginia	Apr 1, 1865	For extraordinary heroism on 1 April 1865, in action at Five Forks, Virginia. Colonel Grindlay was the first to enter the enemy's works, where he captured two flags.
—	Luke M. Griswold	Navy	Ordinary Seaman	(United States Navy) USS Rhode Island	Aboard USS Rhode Island, loss of USS Monitor	December 30, 1862	For extraordinary heroism in action while serving on board the USS Rhode Island which was engaged in saving the lives of the officers and crew of the USS Monitor, 30 December 1862 near Cape Hatteras, North Carolina. Participating in the hazardous rescue of the officers and crew of the sinking Monitor, Ordinary Seaman Griswold, after rescuing several of the men, became separated in a heavy gale with other members of the cutter that had set out from the Rhode Island, and spent many hours in the small boat at the mercy of the weather and high seas until finally picked up by a schooner 50 miles east of Cape Hatteras.
—	George Grueb	Army	Private	(New York (state)) Company E, 158th New York Volunteer Infantry Regiment	Battle of Chaffin's Farm, Virginia	Sep 29, 1864	For extraordinary heroism on 29 September 1864, in action at Chapin's Farm, Virginia, for gallantry in advancing to the ditch of the enemy's works.
	Fitz W. Guerin	Army	Private	Battery A, 1st Missouri Light Artillery	Battle of Grand Gulf, Mississippi	Apr 28, 1863 – Apr 29, 1863	For extraordinary heroism on April 28 & 29, 1863, in action at Grand Gulf, Mississippi. With two comrades Private Guerin voluntarily took position on board the steamer Cheeseman, in charge of all the guns and ammunition of the battery, and remained in charge of the same for a considerable time while the steamer was unmanageable and subjected to a heavy fire from the enemy.
—	Thomas Guinn	Army	Private	Company D, 47th Ohio Volunteer Infantry Regiment	Battle of Vicksburg, Mississippi	May 22, 1863	For gallantry in the charge of the volunteer storming party on 22 May 1863, in action at Vicksburg, Mississippi.
Nathaniel McClean Gwynne	Nathaniel Gwynne	Army	Private	Company H, 13th Ohio Volunteer Cavalry Regiment	Battle of the Crater, Petersburg, Virginia	Jul 30, 1864	For extraordinary heroism on 30 July 1864, in action at Petersburg, Virginia. When about entering upon the charge, Private Gwynne, then but 15 years old, was cautioned not to go in, as he had not been mustered. He indignantly protected and participated in the charge, his left arm being crushed by a shell and amputated soon afterward.

== H ==
Recipients are listed alphabetically by last name. Posthumous receipt is denoted by an asterisk.

This along with the *, indicates that the Medal of Honor was awarded posthumously

Image	Name	Service	Rank	Unit/Command	Place of action	Date of action	Notes
John Hack Civil War MoH winner	John Hack	Army	Private	Company B, 47th Ohio Volunteer Infantry Regiment	Vicksburg, Mississippi	May 3, 1863	For extraordinary heroism on 3 May 1863, in action at Vicksburg, Mississippi. Private Hack was one of a party which volunteered and attempted to run the enemy's batteries with a steam tug and two barges loaded with subsistence stores.
Lester Goodel Hack, awarded MoH for taking colors of 23rd Tenn Infantry CSA	Lester G. Hack	Army	Sergeant	Company F, 5th Vermont Volunteer Infantry Regiment	Third Battle of Petersburg, Virginia	Apr 2, 1865	For extraordinary heroism on 2 April 1865, in action at Petersburg, Virginia, for capture of flag of 23rd Tennessee Infantry (Confederate States of America) with several of the enemy.
Cornelius M Hadley MoH winner	Cornelius M. Hadley	Army	Sergeant	Company F, 9th Michigan Volunteer Cavalry Regiment	Siege of Knoxville, Tennessee	Nov 20, 1863	For extraordinary heroism on 20 November 1863, in action at Fort Sanders, Knoxville, Tennessee. With one companion, Sergeant Hadley voluntarily carried through the enemy's lines important dispatches from General Grant to General Burnside, then besieged within Knoxville, and brought back replies, his comrade's horse being killed and the man taken prisoner.
Osgood T. Hadley 1865 MoH winner 6th NHVI	Osgood T. Hadley	Army	Corporal	Company E, 6th New Hampshire Volunteer Infantry	near Pegram House, Virginia	Sep 30, 1864	For extraordinary heroism on 30 September 1864, in action at Pegram House, Virginia. As Color Bearer of his regiment Corporal Hadley defended his colors with great personal gallantry and brought them safely out of the action.
—	Edmund Haffee	Navy	Quarter Gunner	(United States Navy) USS New Ironsides (1862)	Aboard USS New Ironsides (1862), First and Second Battles of Fort Fisher	Dec 1864 – Jan 1865	For extraordinary heroism in action while serving on board the USS New Ironsides (1862) during action in several attacks on Fort Fisher, North Carolina, 24 and 25 December 1864; and 13, 14, and 15 January 1865. The ship steamed in and took the lead in the ironclad division close inshore, and immediately opened its starboard battery in a barrage of well-directed fire to cause several fires and explosions and dismount several guns during the first two days of fighting. Taken under fire, as she steamed into position on 13 January, the New Ironsides fought all day and took on ammunition at night despite severe weather conditions. When the enemy came out of his bombproof to defend the fort against the storming party, the ship's battery disabled nearly every gun on the fort facing the shore before the cease-fire orders were given by the flagship.
—	Asel Hagerty	Army	Private	(New York (state)) Company A, 61st New York Volunteer Infantry Regiment	Battle of Sayler's Creek, Virginia	Apr 6, 1865	For extraordinary heroism on 6 April 1865, in action at Deatonsville (Sailor's Creek), Virginia, for capture of flag.
	John H. Haight	Army	Sergeant	(New York (state)) Company G, 72nd New York Volunteer Infantry Regiment	Battle of Williamsburg, Virginia, Bristol Station, Virginia, and Manassas, Virginia	May 5, 1862 and Aug 1862	For extraordinary heroism on 5 May 1862, in action at Williamsburg, Virginia. Sergeant Haight voluntarily carried a severely wounded comrade off the field in the face of a large force of the enemy; in doing so was himself severely wounded and taken prisoner. He went into the fight at Bristol Station, Virginia, 27 29 August and 30, 1862, although severely disabled. At Manassas, he volunteered to search the woods for the wounded.
MoH winner Sidney Haight 1st Michigan Sharpshooters	Sidney Haight	Army	Corporal	Company E, 1st Michigan Volunteer Sharpshooters Regiment	Petersburg, Virginia	July 30, 1864	For extraordinary heroism on 30 July 1864, in action at Petersburg, Virginia. Instead of retreating, Corporal Haight remained in the captured works, regardless of his personal safety and exposed to the firing, which he boldly and deliberately returned until the enemy was close upon him.
—	James Haley	Navy	Captain of the Forecastle	(United States Navy) USS Kearsarge	Aboard USS Kearsarge off Cherbourg, France	June 19, 1864	For extraordinary heroism in action, serving as Captain of the Forecastle on board the USS Kearsarge when she destroyed the Alabama off Cherbourg, France, 19 June 1864. Acting as Captain of a gun during the bitter engagement, Haley exhibited marked coolness and good conduct and was highly commended by his division officer for his gallantry and meritorious achievement under enemy fire.
Chaplain Francis B Hall MoH winner	Francis B. Hall	Army	Chaplain	(New York (state)) 16th New York Volunteer Infantry Regiment	Battle of Salem Church, Virginia	May 3, 1863	For extraordinary heroism on 3 May 1863, in action at Salem Heights, Fredericksburg, Virginia. Chaplain Hall voluntarily exposed himself to a heavy fire during the thickest of the fight and carried wounded men to the rear for treatment and attendance.
Hiram "Henry" Seymour Hall, MoH winner	Henry S. Hall	Army	Second Lieutenant	(New York (state)) Company G, 121st New York Volunteer Infantry	Battle of Gaines' Mill, Virginia	June 27, 1862	For extraordinary heroism on 27 June 1862, in action at Gaines Mill, Virginia. Although wounded Second Lieutenant Hall remained on duty and participated in the battle with his company. At Rappahannock Station, Virginia, 7 November 1863, while acting as aide, Captain Hall rendered gallant and prompt assistance in reforming the regiments inside the enemy's works.
—	Newton H. Hall	Army	Corporal	Company I, 104th Ohio Volunteer Infantry Regiment	Battle of Franklin, Tennessee	Nov 30, 1864	For extraordinary heroism on 30 November 1864, in action at Franklin, Tennessee, for capture of flag, believed to have belonged to Steward's Corps (Confederate States of America).
—	Nathan M. Hallock	Army	Private	(New York (state)) Company K, 124th New York Volunteer Infantry Regiment	Bristol Station, Virginia	Jun 15, 1863	For extraordinary heroism on 15 June 1863, in action at Bristoe Station, Virginia. At imminent peril Private Hallock saved from death or capture a disabled officer of his company by carrying him under a hot musketry fire, to a place of safety.
—	William Halstead	Navy	Coxswain	(United States Navy) USS Brooklyn	Aboard USS Brooklyn, Battle of Mobile Bay	August 5, 1864	For extraordinary heroism in action while serving on board the USS Brooklyn during action against rebel forts and gunboats and with the ram Tennessee, in Mobile Bay, Alabama, 5 August 1864. Despite severe damage to his ship and the loss of several men on board as enemy fire raked her decks from stem to stern, Coxswain Halstead fought his gun with skill and courage throughout the furious battle which resulted in the surrender of the prize rebel ram Tennessee and in the damaging and destruction of batteries at Fort Morgan.
—	Mark G. Ham	Navy	Carpenter's Mate	(United States Navy) USS Kearsarge	Aboard USS Kearsarge off Cherbourg, France	June 19, 1864	For extraordinary heroism in action while serving on board the USS Kearsarge when she destroyed the Alabama off Cherbourg, France, 19 June 1864. Performing his duties intelligently and faithfully, Carpenter's Mate Ham distinguished himself in the face of the bitter enemy fire and was highly commended by his divisional officer.
—	Hugh Hamilton	Navy	Coxswain	(United States Navy) USS Richmond	Aboard USS Richmond, Battle of Mobile Bay	August 5, 1864	For extraordinary heroism in action while serving on board the USS Richmond during action against rebel forts and gunboats and with the ram Tennessee, in Mobile Bay, Alabama, 5 August 1864. Despite severe damage to his ship and the loss of several men on board as enemy fire raked her decks from stem to stern, Coxswain Hamilton fought his gun with skill and courage throughout the furious battle which resulted in the surrender of the prize rebel ram Tennessee and in the damaging and destruction of batteries at Fort Morgan.
—	Richard Hamilton	Navy	Coal Heaver	(United States Navy) U.S. Picket Boat No. 1	Aboard	October 27, 1864	For extraordinary heroism in action while serving on board the U.S. Picket Boat No. 1, in action near Plymouth, North Carolina, 27 October 1864, against the Confederate ram Albemarle which had resisted repeated attacks by our steamers and had kept a large force of vessels employed in watching her. The picket boat, equipped with a spar torpedo, succeeded in passing the enemy pickets within 20 yards without being discovered and then made for the Albemarle under a full head of steam. Immediately taken under fire by the ram, the small boat plunged on, jumped the log boom which encircled the target and exploded its torpedo under the port bow of the ram. The picket boat was destroyed by enemy fire and almost the entire crew taken prisoner or lost.
—	Thomas W. Hamilton	Navy	Quartermaster	(United States Navy) USS Cincinnati	Aboard USS Cincinnati, Operations against Vicksburg	May 27, 1863	For extraordinary heroism in action while serving as Quartermaster on board the USS Cincinnati during the attack on the Vicksburg (Mississippi) batteries and at the time of her sinking, 27 May 1863. Engaging the enemy in a fierce battle, the Cincinnati, amidst an incessant fire of shot and shell, continued to fire her guns to the last although so penetrated by enemy shell fire that her fate was sealed. Conspicuously gallant during this action, Quartermaster Hamilton, severely wounded at the wheel, returned to his post and had to be sent below, to hear the incessant roar of guns as the gallant ship went down, "her colors nailed to the mast."
—	Henry A. Hammel	Army	Sergeant	Battery A, 1st Missouri Light Artillery	Grand Gulf, Mississippi	Apr 28, 1863 – Apr 29, 1863	For extraordinary heroism on April 28 & 29, 1863, in action at Grand Gulf, Mississippi. With two comrades Sergeant Hammel voluntarily took position on board the steamer Cheeseman, in charge of all the guns and ammunition of the battery, and remained in charge of the same for considerable time while the steamer was unmanageable and subjected to a heavy fire from the enemy.
—	Allexander Hand	Navy	Quartermaster	(United States Navy) USS Ceres	Aboard USS Ceres	July 9, 1862	For extraordinary heroism in action while serving on board the USS Ceres in the fight near Hamilton, Roanoke River, North Carolina, 9 July 1862. Fired on by the enemy with small arms, Quartermaster Hand courageously returned the raking enemy fire and was spoken of for good conduct and cool bravery under enemy fire, by the commanding officer.
Head and shoulders of an older white man with a long beard and white hair, wearing a dark suit coat.	Milton L. Haney	Army	Chaplain	55th Illinois Volunteer Infantry	Battle of Atlanta, Georgia	Jul 22, 1864	For extraordinary heroism on 22 July 1864, in action at Atlanta, Georgia. Chaplain Haney voluntarily carried a musket in the ranks of his regiment and rendered heroic service in retaking the Federal works which had been captured by the enemy.
—	Edward R. Hanford	Army	Private	(United States) 2nd U.S. Cavalry Regiment	Woodstock, Virginia	Oct 9, 1864	For extraordinary heroism on 9 October 1864, in action at Woodstock, Virginia, for capture of flag of 32nd Battalion Virginia Cavalry (Confederate States of America)..
—	Joseph Hanks	Army	Private	37th Ohio Infantry	Vicksburg Mississippi	May 22, 1863	For extraordinary heroism on 22 May 1863, in action at Vicksburg, Mississippi. Private Hanks voluntarily and under fire went to the rescue of a wounded comrade lying between the lines, gave him water, and brought him off the field.
Head and shoulders of a white man with a mustache and long, bushy sideburns, wearing a suit coat with an oval emblem on each lapel.	Marcus A. Hanna	Army	Sergeant	Company B, 50th Massachusetts Volunteer Infantry	Siege of Port Hudson, Louisiana	Jul 4, 1863	For extraordinary heroism on 4 July 1863, in action at Port Hudson, Louisiana. Sergeant Hanna voluntarily exposed himself to a heavy fire to get water for comrades in rifle pits.
	Milton Hanna	Army	Corporal	Company B, 2nd Minnesota Volunteer Infantry Regiment	Nolensville, Tennessee	Feb 15, 1863	For extraordinary heroism on 15 February 1863, in action at Nolensville, Tennessee. Corporal Hanna was one of a detachment of 16 men who heroically defended a wagon train against the attack of 125 cavalry, repulsed the attack and saved the train.
—	Moses C. Hanscom	Army	Corporal	Company F, 19th Maine Volunteer Infantry Regiment	Bristoe Station, Virginia	Oct 14, 1863	For extraordinary heroism on 14 October 1863, in action at Bristoe Station, Virginia, for capture of the flag of 26th North Carolina (Confederate States of America).
	Douglas Hapeman	Army	Lieutenant Colonel	104th Illinois Infantry	Battle of Peachtree Creek, Georgia	Jul 20, 1864	For extraordinary heroism on 20 July 1864, in action at Peach Tree Creek, Georgia. With conspicuous coolness and bravery Lieutenant Colonel Hapeman rallied his men under a severe attack, re-formed the broken ranks, and repulsed the attack.
Medal of Honor winner	John H. Harbourne	Army	Private	Company K, 29th Massachusetts Infantry	Second Battle of Petersburg, Virginia	Jun 17, 1864	For extraordinary heroism on 17 June 1864, in action at Petersburg, Virginia, for capture of flag along with three enemy men.
—	Thomas Harcourt	Navy	Ordinary Seaman	(United States Navy) USS Minnesota	Aboard USS Minnesota, Second Battle of Fort Fisher	January 15, 1865	For extraordinary heroism in action while serving on board the USS Minnesota in action during the assault on Fort Fisher, North Carolina, 15 January 1865. Landing on the beach with the assaulting party from his ship, Ordinary Seaman Harcourt advanced to the top of the sand hill and partly through the breach in the palisades despite enemy fire which killed and wounded many officers and men. When more than two-thirds of the men become seized with panic and retreated on the run, he remained with the party until dark when it came safely away, bringing its wounded, its arms and its colors.
—	Henry M. Hardenbergh*	Army	Private	39th Illinois Veteran Volunteer Infantry	Deep Run, Virginia	Aug 16, 1864	for extraordinary heroism on 16 August 1864, in action at Deep Run, Virginia, for capture of flag. Private Hardenbergh was wounded in the shoulder during this action. He was killed in action at Petersburg, Virginia, on 28 August 1864.
—	Thomas Harding	Navy	Captain of the Forecastle	(United States Navy) USS Dacotah	Aboard USS Dacotah	June 9, 1864	For extraordinary heroism in action, serving as Captain of the Forecastle on board the USS Dacotah on the occasion of the destruction of the blockade runner Pevensey, near Beaufort, North Carolina, 9 June 1864. Learning that one of the officers in the boat, which was in danger of being, and subsequently was, swamped, could not swim, Captain of the Forecastle Harding remarked to him: "If we are swamped, sir, I shall carry you to the beach or I will never go there myself.'" He did not succeed in carrying out his promise, but made desperate efforts to do so, while others thought only of themselves. Such conduct is worthy of appreciation and admiration—a sailor risking his own life to save that of an officer.
Medal of Honor winner	Abram P. Haring	Army	First Lieutenant	(New York (state)) Company G, 132nd New York Volunteer Infantry Regiment	Bachelors Creek, North Carolina	Feb 1, 1864	For extraordinary heroism on 1 February 1864, in action at Bachelor's Creek, North Carolina. With a command of 11 men, on picket, First Lieutenant Haring resisted the attack of an overwhelming force of the enemy.
—	Bernard Harley	Navy	Ordinary Seaman	(United States Navy) U.S. Picket Boat No. 1	Aboard U.S. Picket Boat No. 1	October 27, 1864	For extraordinary heroism in action while serving on board the U.S. Picket Boat No. 1, in action near Plymouth, North Carolina, 27 October 1864, against the Confederate ram Albemarle which had resisted repeated attacks by our steamers and had kept a large force of vessels employed in watching her. The picket boat, equipped with a spar torpedo, succeeded in passing the enemy pickets within 20 yards without being discovered and then made for the Albemarle under a full head of steam. Immediately taken under fire by the ram, the small boat plunged on, jumped the log boom which encircled the target and exploded its torpedo under the port bow of the ram. The picket boat was destroyed by enemy fire and almost the entire crew taken prisoner or lost.
—	Amzi D. Harmon	Army	Corporal	Company K, 211th Pennsylvania Infantry	Third Battle of Petersburg, Virginia	Apr 2, 1865	For extraordinary heroism on 2 April 1865, in action at Petersburg, Virginia, for capture of flag.
—	Daniel Harrington	Navy	Landsman	(United States Navy) USS Pocahontas	USS Pocahontas landing party	March 11, 1862	Harrington participated in a shore mission to procure meat for the ship's crew. While returning to the beach, the party was fired on from ambush and several men killed or wounded. Cool and courageous throughout his action, Harrington rendered gallant service against the enemy and in administering to the casualties.
	Ephraim W. Harrington	Army	Sergeant	Company G, 2nd Vermont Infantry	Second Battle of Fredericksburg, Virginia	May 3, 1863	Carried the colors to the top of the heights and almost to the muzzle of the enemy's guns.
—	George W. Harris	Army	Private	Company B, 148th Pennsylvania Infantry	Battle of Spotsylvania Court House, Virginia	May 12, 1864	Capture of flag, wresting it from the color bearer and shooting an officer who attempted to regain it.
A black man sitting in a chair, wearing a forage cap and a suit coat over a vest and holding a revolver in his left hand. On the vest is a watch fob chain and a circular medal hanging from a ribbon.	James H. Harris	Army	Sergeant	Company B, 38th Regiment United States Colored Troops	Battle of Chaffin's Farm, Virginia	Sep 29, 1864	Gallantry in the assault.
—	John Harris	Navy	Captain of the Forecastle	(United States Navy) USS Metacomet	Aboard USS Metacomet, Battle of Mobile Bay	August 5, 1864	As captain of the forecastle on board USS Metacomet, Harris was a member of the boat's crew which went to the rescue of the officers and crew of the U.S. monitor Tecumseh, when that vessel was struck by a torpedo in passing the enemy forts in Mobile Bay, 5 August 1864.
	Moses Harris	Army	First Lieutenant	(United States) 1st U.S. Cavalry	Smithfield, Virginia	Aug 28, 1864	In an attack upon a largely superior force, his personal gallantry was so conspicuous as to inspire the men to extraordinary efforts, resulting in complete rout of the enemy.
	Sampson Harris	Army	Private	Company K, 37th Ohio Volunteer Infantry Regiment	Battle of Vicksburg, Mississippi	May 22, 1863	For gallantry in the charge of the volunteer storming party on 22 May 1863, in action at Vicksburg, Mississippi.
—	George H. Harrison	Navy	Seaman	(United States Navy) USS Kearsarge	Aboard USS Kearsarge off Cherbourg, France	June 19, 1864	Served on board USS Kearsarge when she destroyed the Confederate raider Alabama off Cherbourg, France, 19 June 1864. Acting as sponger and loader of the 11-inch pivot gun during the bitter engagement, Harrison exhibited marked coolness and good conduct and was highly recommended for his gallantry under fire by the divisional officer.
—	John W. Hart	Army	Sergeant	Company D, 6th Pennsylvania Reserve Regiment	Battle of Gettysburg, Pennsylvania	Jul 2, 1863	Was one of six volunteers who charged upon a log house near the Devil's Den, where a squad of the enemy's sharpshooters were sheltered, and compelled their surrender.
—	William E. Hart	Army	Private	(New York (state)) Company B, 8th New York Volunteer Cavalry Regiment	Shenandoah Valley, Virginia	1864 and 1865	Gallant conduct and services as scout in connection with capture of the guerrilla Harry Gilmor, and other daring acts.
Head and torso of a white man with a mustache and wavy hair wearing an ornate military jacket. The jacket has fringed shoulder boards, a wide sash across the chest, and four medals pinned to the center and left half of the chest.	John F. Hartranft	Army	Colonel	4th Pennsylvania Volunteer Infantry	First Battle of Bull Run, Virginia	Jul 21, 1861	Remained in battle despite his term of service having ended.
—	Harry Harvey	Army	Corporal	(New York (state)) Company A, 22nd New York Volunteer Cavalry Regiment	Battle of Waynesboro, Virginia	Mar 2, 1865	Capture of flag and bearer, with two other prisoners.
—	Frank W. Haskell	Army	Sergeant Major	3rd Maine Volunteer Infantry Regiment	Battle of Seven Pines, Virginia	Jun 1, 1862	Assumed command of a portion of the left wing of his regiment, all the company officers present having been killed or disabled, led it gallantly across a stream and contributed most effectively to the success of the action.
—	Marcus M. Haskell	Army	Sergeant	Company C, 35th Regiment Massachusetts Volunteer Infantry	Battle of Antietam, Maryland	Sep 17, 1862	Although wounded and exposed to a heavy fire from the enemy, at the risk of his own life he rescued a badly wounded comrade and succeeded in conveying him to a place of safety.
Medal of Honor winner	Smith H. Hastings	Army	Captain	Company M, 5th Michigan Volunteer Cavalry Regiment	Newbys Crossroads, Virginia	Jul 24, 1863	While in command of a squadron in rear guard of a cavalry division, then retiring before the advance of a corps of infantry, was attacked by the enemy and, orders having been given to abandon the guns of a section of field artillery with the rear guard that were in imminent danger of capture, he disregarded the orders received and aided in repelling the attack and saving the guns.
Head and shoulders of a white man with a Van Dyke mustache and beard, wearing a double-breasted military jacket with a rectangular patch over the shoulder.	John P. Hatch	Army	Brigadier General	(United States) 1st Division, III Corps	Battle of South Mountain, Maryland	Sep 14, 1862	Was severely wounded while leading one of his brigades in the attack under a heavy fire from the enemy.
—	Edward W. Hathaway	Navy	Seaman	(United States Navy) USS Sciota	Aboard USS Sciota, Vicksburg, Mississippi	June 28, 1862	Struck by a bullet which severed his left arm above the elbow, Hathaway displayed exceptional courage as his ship sustained numerous damaging hits from stem to stern while proceeding down the river to fight the battle of Vicksburg.
—	John H. Havron	Army	Sergeant	Battery G, 1st Rhode Island Light Artillery	Third Battle of Petersburg, Virginia	Apr 2, 1865	Was one of a detachment of 20 picket artillerymen who voluntarily accompanied an infantry assaulting party and who turned upon the enemy the guns captured in the assault.
—	Charles Hawkins	Navy	Seaman	(United States Navy) USS Agawam	Aboard USS Agawam, First Battle of Fort Fisher	December 23, 1864	Hawkins served on board USS Agawam, as one of a volunteer crew of a powderboat which was exploded near Fort Fisher, 23 December 1864.
	Gardner C. Hawkins	Army	First Lieutenant	Company D, 3rd Vermont Volunteer Infantry Regiment	Third Battle of Petersburg, Virginia	Apr 2, 1865	When the lines were wavering from the well-directed fire of the enemy, this officer, acting adjutant of the regiment, sprang forward, and with encouraging words cheered the soldiers on and, although dangerously wounded, refused to leave the field until the enemy's works were taken.
Sketch of a white man with a wide mustache and dark wavy hair, wearing a suit and bowtie.	Martin J. Hawkins	Army	Corporal	Company A, 33rd Ohio Infantry	Great Locomotive Chase, Georgia	Apr 1862	One of the 19 of 22 men (including 2 civilians) who, by direction of Gen. Mitchell (or Buell), penetrated nearly 200 miles south into enemy territory and captured a railroad train at Big Shanty, Georgia, in an attempt to destroy the bridges and track between Chattanooga and Atlanta.
Head of a young black man with close-cropped hair wearing a dark suit coat over a shirt and tie.	Thomas R. Hawkins	Army	Sergeant Major	6th United States Colored Infantry Regiment	Battle of Chaffin's Farm, Virginia	Sep 29, 1864	Rescue of regimental colors.
Medal of Honor winner	Harris S. Hawthorne	Army	Corporal	(New York (state)) Company F, 121st New York Volunteer Infantry	Battle of Sayler's Creek, Virginia	Apr 6, 1865	Captured the Confederate Gen. G. W. Custis Lee.
—	Joseph B. Hayden	Navy	Quartermaster	(United States Navy) USS Ticonderoga	Aboard USS Ticonderoga, Second Battle of Fort Fisher	January 13, 1865 – January 15, 1865	On board USS Ticonderoga, as quartermaster in charge of steering the ship into action, during attacks on Fort Fisher, 13 to 15 January 1865.
Medal of Honor winner	John Hayes	Navy	Coxswain	(United States Navy) USS Kearsarge	Aboard USS Kearsarge off Cherbourg, France	June 19, 1864	Served on board USS Kearsarge when she destroyed the Confederate raider Alabama off Cherbourg, France, 19 June 1864. Acting as second captain of the No. 2 gun during this bitter engagement, Hayes exhibited marked coolness and good conduct and was highly recommended for his gallantry under fire by the divisional officer.
—	Thomas Hayes	Navy	Coxswain	(United States Navy) USS Richmond	Aboard USS Richmond, Battle of Mobile Bay	August 5, 1864	As Captain of No. 1 gun on board USS Richmond during action against rebel forts and gunboats and with the ram Tennessee in Mobile Bay, 5 August 1864. Cool and courageous at his station throughout the prolonged action, Hayes maintained fire from his gun on Fort Morgan and on ships of the Confederacy despite extremely heavy return fire.
—	Asbury F. Haynes	Army	Corporal	Company F, 17th Maine Volunteer Infantry	Battle of Sayler's Creek, Virginia	Apr 6, 1865	Capture of flag
	John H. Hays	Army	Private	Company F, 4th Iowa Volunteer Cavalry Regiment	Columbus, Georgia	Apr 16, 1865	Capture of flag and bearer Austin's Battery (C.S.A.).
Medal of Honor winner	George W. Healey	Army	Private	5th Iowa Volunteer Cavalry Regiment	Newnan, Georgia	Jul 29, 1864	When nearly surrounded by the enemy, captured a Confederate soldier, and with the aid of a comrade who joined him later, captured 4 other Confederate soldiers, disarmed the 5 prisoners, and brought them all into the Union lines.
—	Joseph S. Hedges	Army	First Lieutenant	(United States) 4th U.S. Cavalry	near Harpeth River, Tennessee	Dec 17, 1864	At the head of his regiment charged a field battery with strong infantry supports, broke the enemy's line and, with other mounted troops, captured 3 guns and many prisoners.
MoH Winner William Laing Heermance	William L. Heermance	Army	Captain	(New York (state)) Company C, 6th New York Cavalry	Battle of Chancellorsville, Virginia	Apr 30, 1863	Took command of the regiment as its senior officer when surrounded by Stuart's Cavalry. The regiment cut its way through the enemy's line and escaped but Capt. Heermance was desperately wounded, left for dead on the field and was taken prisoner.
—	Henry Heller	Army	Sergeant	Company A, 66th Ohio Infantry	Battle of Chancellorsville, Virginia	May 2, 1863	One of a party of four who, under heavy fire, voluntarily brought into the Union lines a wounded Confederate officer from whom was obtained valuable information concerning the position of the enemy.
—	David H. Helms	Army	Private	Company B, 83rd Indiana Volunteer Infantry Regiment	Battle of Vicksburg, Mississippi	May 22, 1863	For gallantry in the charge of the volunteer storming party on 22 May 1863, in action at Vicksburg, Mississippi.
	Guy V. Henry	Army	Colonel	40th Massachusetts Volunteer Infantry Regiment	Battle of Cold Harbor, Virginia	Jun 1, 1864	Led the assaults of his brigade upon the enemy's works.
—	James Henry	Army	Sergeant	Company B, 113th Illinois Volunteer Infantry	Battle of Vicksburg, Mississippi	May 22, 1863	For gallantry in the charge of the volunteer storming party on 22 May 1863, in action at Vicksburg, Mississippi.
	William W. Henry	Army	Colonel	10th Vermont Infantry	Battle of Cedar Creek, Virginia	Oct 19, 1864	Though suffering from severe wounds, rejoined his regiment and let it in a brilliant charge, recapturing the guns of an abandoned battery.
—	Pitt B. Herington	Army	Private	Company E, 11th Iowa Volunteer Infantry Regiment	near Kenesaw Mountain, Georgia	Jun 15, 1864	With one companion and under a fierce fire of the enemy at close range, went to the rescue of a wounded comrade who had fallen between the lines and carried him to a place of safety.
A white man with wavy hair and extremely bushy sideburns connected to a mustache, sitting in a chair. He is wearing a long double-breasted military coat with a rectangular patch over each shoulder.	Francis J. Herron	Army	Lieutenant Colonel	9th Iowa Volunteer Infantry Regiment	Pea Ridge, Ark.	May 7, 1862	Was foremost in leading his men, rallying them to repeated acts of daring, until himself disabled and taken prisoner.
A white man moustache.	Francis S. Hesseltine	Army	Lieutenant Colonel	13th Maine Volunteer Infantry Regiment	Matagorda Bay, Tex.	Dec 29, 1863 – Dec 30, 1863	In command of a detachment of 100 men, conducted a reconnaissance for 2 days, baffling and beating back an attacking force of more than a thousand Confederate cavalry, and regained his transport without loss.
A white man moustache.	Joseph C. Hibson	Army	Private	(New York (state)) Company C, 48th New York Infantry	near Fort Wagner, South Carolina	Jul 1863	While voluntarily performing picket duty under fire on 13 July 1863, was attacked and his surrender demanded, but he killed his assailant. The day following responded to a call for a volunteer to reconnoiter the enemy's position, and went within the enemy's lines under fire and was exposed to great danger. On 18 July voluntarily exposed himself with great gallantry during an assault, and received 3 wounds that permanently disabled him for active service.
—	Dennis W. Hickey	Army	Sergeant	(New York (state)) Company E, 2nd New York Volunteer Cavalry Regiment	Stony Creek Bridge, Virginia	Jun 29, 1864	With a detachment of three men, tore up the bridge at Stony Creek being the last man on the bridge and covering the retreat until he was shot down.
—	John Hickman	Navy	Second Class Fireman	(United States Navy) USS Richmond	Aboard USS Richmond, Siege of Port Hudson	March 14, 1863	Served on board USS Richmond in the attack on Port Hudson, 14 March 1863.
—	Nathan E. Hickok	Army	Corporal	Company A, 8th Connecticut Volunteer Infantry Regiment	Battle of Chaffin's Farm, Virginia	Sep 29, 1864	Capture of flag
—	Charles Higby	Army	Private	Company F, 1st Pennsylvania Cavalry Regiment	Appomattox Campaign, Virginia	Mar 29, 1865 – Apr 9, 1865	Capture of flag
Head and shoulders of a white man with hair combed to one side and a full beard, wearing a suit with a bow tie and a star-shaped medal on the left breast.	Thomas J. Higgins	Army	Sergeant	Company D, 99th Illinois Volunteer Infantry Regiment	Battle of Vicksburg, Mississippi	May 22, 1863	Received the Medal of Honor at the request of the Confederates who captured him.
—	Patrick Highland	Army	Corporal	Company D, 23rd Illinois Volunteer Infantry Regiment	Third Battle of Petersburg, Virginia	Apr 2, 1865	Conspicuous gallantry as color bearer in the assault on Fort Gregg.
	Edward Hill	Army	Captain	Company K, 16th Michigan Infantry	Battle of Cold Harbor, Virginia	Jun 1, 1864	Led the brigade skirmish line in a desperate charge on the enemy's masked batteries to the muzzles of the guns, where he was severely wounded.
—	Henry Hill	Army	Corporal	Company C, 50th Pennsylvania Volunteer Infantry	Battle of the Wilderness, Virginia	May 6, 1864	This soldier, with one companion, would not retire when his regiment fell back in confusion after an unsuccessful charge, but instead advanced and continued firing upon the enemy until the regiment re-formed and regained its position.
	James Hill	Army	First Lieutenant	Company C, 21st Iowa Volunteer Infantry	Battle of Champion Hill, Mississippi	May 16, 1863	By skillful and brave management captured three of the enemy's pickets.
—	James Hill	Army	Sergeant	(New York (state)) Company C, 14th New York Heavy Artillery	Battle of the Crater, Petersburg, Virginia	Jul 30, 1864	Capture of flag, shooting a Confederate officer who was rallying his men with the colors in his hand.
	Benjamin F. Hilliker	Army	Musician	Company A, 8th Wisconsin Volunteer Infantry Regiment	Mechanicsburg, Mississippi	June 4, 1863	When men were needed to oppose a superior Confederate force he laid down his drum for a rifle and proceeded to the front of the skirmish line which was about 120 ft (37 m) from the enemy. While on this volunteer mission and firing at the enemy he was hit in the head with a minie ball which passed through him. An order was given to "lay him in the shade; he won't last long." He recovered from this wound being left with an ugly scar.
	William G. Hills	Army	Private	(New York (state)) Company E, 9th New York Volunteer Cavalry Regiment	North Fork, Virginia	September 26, 1864	Voluntarily carried a severely wounded comrade out of a heavy fire of the enemy.
—	Alfred B. Hilton*	Army	Sergeant	Company H, 4th Regiment United States Colored Infantry	Battle of Chaffin's Farm, Virginia	September 29, 1864	When the regimental color bearer fell, this soldier seized the color and carried it forward, together with the national standard, until disabled at the enemy's inner line.
	William B. Hincks	Army	Sergeant Major	Company A, 14th Connecticut Infantry Regiment	Battle of Gettysburg, Pennsylvania	Jul 3, 1863	During the high-water mark of Pickett's charge on 3 July 1863 the colors of the 14th Tenn. Inf. C.S.A. were planted 50 yards in front of the center of Sgt. Maj. Hincks' regiment.
—	William Hinnegan	Navy	Second Class Fireman	(United States Navy) USS Agawam	Aboard USS Agawam, First Battle of Fort Fisher	December 23, 1864	Hinnegan served on board USS Agawam, as one of a volunteer crew of powder boat which was exploded near Fort Fisher, 23 December 1864.
—	Addison J. Hodges	Army	Private	Company B, 47th Ohio Volunteer Infantry Regiment	Vicksburg, Mississippi	May 3, 1863	Was one of a party that volunteered and attempted to run the enemy's batteries with a steam tug and 2 barges loaded with subsistence stores.
	Heinrich Hoffman	Army	Corporal	Company M, 2nd Ohio Cavalry	Battle of Sayler's Creek, Virginia	Apr 6, 1865	Capture of flag.
	Thomas W. Hoffman	Army	Captain	Company A, 208th Pennsylvania Volunteer Infantry Regiment	Third Battle of Petersburg, Virginia	Apr 2, 1865	Prevented a retreat of his regiment during the battle.
—	Franklin Hogan	Army	Corporal	Company A, 45th Pennsylvania Volunteer Infantry Regiment	Battle of the Crater, Petersburg, Virginia	Jul 30, 1864	Capture of flag of 6th Virginia Infantry (C.S.A.).
Medal of Honor winner	William P. Hogarty	Army	Private	(New York (state)) Company D, 2nd New York Volunteer Infantry Regiment	Battle of Antietam, Maryland and Battle of Fredericksburg, Virginia	Sep 17, 1862 and Dec 13, 1862	Distinguished gallantry in actions while attached to Battery B, 4th U.S. Artillery; lost his left arm at Fredericksburg.
—	Daniel Holcomb	Army	Private	Company A, 41st Ohio Volunteer Infantry Regiment	Brentwood Hills, Tennessee	Dec 16, 1864	Capture of Confederate guidon.
Medal of Honor winner	James Holehouse	Army	Private	Company B, 7th Massachusetts Volunteer Infantry	Marye's Heights, Virginia	May 3, 1863	First name sometimes given as John. With one companion voluntarily and with conspicuous daring advanced beyond his regiment, which had been broken In the assault, and halted beneath the crest. Following the example of these two men, the colors were brought to the summit, the regiment was advanced and the position held.
—	Lemuel F. Holland	Army	Corporal	Company D, 104th Illinois Volunteer Infantry Regiment	Elk River, Tennessee	Jul 2, 1863	Voluntarily joined a small party that, under a heavy fire, captured a stockade and saved the bridge.
Medal of Honor winner	Milton M. Holland	Army	Sergeant Major	5th United States Colored Infantry	Battle of Chaffin's Farm, Virginia	Sep 29, 1864	Took command of Company C, after all the officers had been killed or wounded, and gallantly led it.
—	George Hollat	Navy	Third Class Boy	(United States Navy) USS Varuna	Aboard USS Varuna, Battle of Forts Jackson and St. Philip	April 24, 1862	Hollat served as third class boy on board USS Varuna during an attack on Forts Jackson and St. Philip, 24 April 1862.
Medal of Honor winner	Lovilo N. Holmes	Army	First Sergeant	Company H, 2nd Minnesota Volunteer Infantry Regiment	Nolensville, Tennessee	Feb 15, 1863	Was one of a detachment of 16 men who heroically defended a wagon train against the attack of 125 cavalry, repulsed the attack and saved the train.
Medal of Honor winner	William T. Holmes	Army	Private	Company A, 3rd Indiana Volunteer Cavalry Regiment	Battle of Sayler's Creek, Virginia	Apr 6, 1865	Capture of flag of 27th Virginia Infantry (C.S.A.).
Medal of Honor winner	Charles M. Holton	Army	First Sergeant	Company A, 7th Michigan Volunteer Cavalry Regiment	Falling Waters, Virginia	Jul 14, 1863	Capture of flag of 55th Virginia Infantry (C.S.A.). In the midst of the battle with foot soldiers he dismounted to capture the flag.
—	Edward A. Holton	Army	First Sergeant	Company I, 6th Vermont Volunteer Infantry Regiment	Lees Mills, Virginia	Apr 16, 1862	Rescued the colors of his regiment under heavy fire, the color bearer having been shot down while the troops were in retreat.
—	Conrad Homan	Army	Color Sergeant	Company A, 29th Massachusetts Volunteer Infantry Regiment	Battle of the Crater, Petersburg, Virginia	Jul 30, 1864	Fought his way through the enemy's lines with the regimental colors, the rest of the color guard being killed or captured.
Medal of Honor winner	George W. Hooker	Army	First Lieutenant	Company E, 4th Vermont Volunteer Infantry Regiment	Battle of South Mountain, Maryland	Sep 14, 1862	Rode alone, in advance of his regiment, into the enemy's lines, and before his own men came up received the surrender of the major of a Confederate regiment, together with the colors and 116 men.
—	William B. Hooper	Army	Corporal	Company L, 1st New Jersey Volunteer Cavalry	Chamberlains Creek, Virginia	Mar 31, 1865	With the assistance of a comrade, headed off the advance of the enemy, shooting two of his color bearers; also posted himself between the enemy and the led horses of his own command, thus saving the herd from capture.
Medal of Honor winner	Charles F. Hopkins	Army	Corporal	Company I, 1st New Jersey Volunteer Infantry	Gaines Mill, Virginia	Jun 27, 1862	Voluntarily carried a wounded comrade, under heavy fire, to a place of safety; though twice wounded in the act, he continued in action until again severely wounded.
Medal of Honor winner	Thomas Horan	Army	Sergeant	(New York (state)) Company E, 72nd New York Volunteer Infantry Regiment	Battle of Gettysburg, Pennsylvania	Jul 2, 1863	In a charge of his regiment this soldier captured the regimental flag of the 8th Florlda Infantry (C.S.A.).
Head of a white man with a bushy mustache wearing a dark suit and bow tie. The portrait is surrounded by an oval-shaped frame decorated with stars and stripes.	Michael C. Horgan	Navy	Landsman	(United States Navy) USS Tacony	Aboard USS Tacony	October 31, 1864	Served under the name "Martin Howard", medal issued in this name. Served on board the U.S.S. Tacony during the taking of Plymouth, N.C., 31 October 1864. Carrying out his duties faithfully during the capture of Plymouth, Howard distinguished himself by a display of coolness when he participated in landing and spiking a 9-inch gun while under a devastating fire from enemy musketry.
Medal of Honor winner	Samuel B. Horne	Army	Captain	Company H, 11th Connecticut Volunteer Infantry Regiment	Fort Harrison, Battle of Chaffin's Farm, Virginia	Sep 29, 1864	While acting as an aide and carrying an important message, was severely wounded and his horse killed but delivered the order and rejoined his general.
Head and shoulders of a young white man with unkempt hair sticking out from under a tilted forage cap. He is wearing an open jacket over a white shirt.	William H. Horsfall	Army	Drummer	Company G, 1st Kentucky Infantry Regiment	Siege of Corinth, Mississippi	May 21, 1862	Fifteen years old at time of Medal of Honor action.
—	James Horton (Medal of Honor, 1864)	Navy	Gunner's Mate	(United States Navy) USS Montauk	Aboard USS Montauk	September 21, 1864	During the night of 21 September, when fire was discovered in the magazine lightroom of the vessel, causing a panic and demoralizing the crew, Horton rushed into the cabin, obtained the magazine keys, sprang into the lightroom and began passing out combustibles, Including the box of signals in which the fire originated.
Lewis A Horton Walking	Lewis A. Horton	Navy	Seaman	(United States Navy) USS Rhode Island	Aboard USS Rhode Island, loss of USS Monitor	December 30, 1862	Served on board USS Rhode Island, which was engaged in saving the lives of the officers and crew of USS Monitor, 30 December 1862.
—	Solomon J. Hottenstine	Army	Private	Company C, 107th Pennsylvania Volunteer Infantry Regiment	Petersburg and Norfolk Railroad, Virginia	Aug 19, 1864	Captured flag belonging to a North Carolina regiment, and through a ruse led them into the arms of Federal troops.
Medal of Honor winner	Ira Hough	Army	Private	Company E, 8th Indiana Volunteer Infantry Regiment	Battle of Cedar Creek, Virginia	Oct 19, 1864	Capture of flag.
Medal of Honor winner	Charles H. Houghton	Army	Captain	(New York (state)) Company L, 14th New York Heavy Artillery	Battle of the Crater and Battle of Fort Stedman, Petersburg, Virginia	Jul 30, 1864 and Mar 25, 1865	In the Union assault at the Crater (30 July 1864), and in the Confederate assault repelled at Fort Haskell, displayed most conspicuous gallantry and repeatedly exposed himself voluntarily to great danger, was three times wounded, and suffered loss of a leg.
Medal of Honor winner	Edward J. Houghton	Navy	Ordinary Seaman	(United States Navy) U.S. Picket Boat No. 1	Aboard U.S. Picket Boat No. 1	October 27, 1864	Houghton served on board the U.S. Picket Boat No. 1 in action, 27 October 1864, against the Confederate ram Albemarle, which had resisted repeated attacks by our steamers and had kept a large force of vessels employed in watching her.
—	George L. Houghton	Army	Private	Company D, 104th Illinois Volunteer Infantry Regiment	Elk River, Tennessee	Jul 2, 1863	Voluntarily joined a small party that, under a heavy fire, captured a stockade and saved the bridge.
	William Houlton	Army	Commissary Sergeant	1st West Virginia Cavalry	Battle of Sayler's Creek, Virginia	Apr 6, 1865	Capture of flag.
—	Henderson C. Howard	Army	Corporal	Company B, 11th Pennsylvania Reserve Regiment	Glendale, Virginia	Jun 30, 1862	While pursuing one of the enemy's sharpshooters, encountered 2 others, whom he bayoneted in hand-to-hand encounters; was 3 times wounded in action.
	Hiram R. Howard	Army	Private	Company H, 11th Ohio Volunteer Infantry Regiment	Missionary Ridge, Tennessee	November 25, 1863	Scaled the enemy's works and in a hand-to-hand fight helped capture the flag of the 18th Alabama Infantry (C.S.A.).
Medal of Honor winner	James Howard	Army	Sergeant	(New York (state)) Company K, 158th New York Volunteer Infantry Regiment	Fort Gregg, Third Battle of Petersburg, Virginia	Apr 2, 1865	Carried the colors in advance of the line of battle, the flagstaff being shot off while he was planting it on the parapet of the fort.
Head and shoulders of a white man with a full bushy beard and thick hair, wearing a double-breasted military jacket with a patch with two stars on the top of each shoulder.	Oliver O. Howard	Army	Brigadier General	(New York (state)) 61st New York Volunteer Infantry Regiment	Battle of Seven Pines, Virginia	Jun 1, 1862	Led the 61st New York Infantry in a charge in which he was twice severely wounded in the right arm, necessitating amputation.
—	Peter Howard	Navy	Boatswain's Mate	(United States Navy) USS Mississippi	Aboard USS Mississippi, Siege of Port Hudson	March 14, 1863	Served on board USS Mississippi during the action against Port Hudson, 14 March 1863.
Medal of Honor winner	Squire E. Howard	Army	First Sergeant	Company H, 8th Vermont Volunteer Infantry Regiment	Bayou Teche, Louisiana	Jan 14, 1863	Voluntarily carried an important message through the heavy fire of the enemy to bring aid and save the gunboat Calhoun.
Medal of Honor winner	Orion P. Howe	Army	Musician	Company C, 55th Illinois Volunteer Infantry Regiment	Battle of Vicksburg, Mississippi	May 19, 1863	A drummer boy, 14 years of age, and severely wounded and exposed to a heavy fire from the enemy, he persistently remained upon the field of battle until he had reported to Gen. W. T. Sherman the necessity of supplying cartridges for the use of troops under command of Colonel Malmborg.
Medal of Honor winner	William H. Howe	Army	Sergeant	Company K, 29th Massachusetts Volunteer Infantry Regiment	Battle of Fort Stedman, Virginia	Mar 25, 1865	Served an abandoned gun under heavy fire.
Medal of Honor winner	William S. Hubbell	Army	Captain	Company A, 21st Connecticut Infantry Regiment	Fort Harrison, Battle of Chaffin's Farm, Virginia	Sep 30, 1864	Bravery in leading flanking movement, capturing large number of prisoners.
—	Aaron R. Hudson	Army	Private	Company C, 17th Indiana Volunteer Mounted Infantry Regiment	Culloden, Georgia	Apr 1865	Capture of flag of Worrill Grays (C.S.A.).
—	Michael Hudson	Marine Corps	Sergeant	(United States Marine Corps) USS Brooklyn	Aboard USS Brooklyn, Battle of Mobile Bay	August 5, 1864	On board USS Brooklyn during action against rebel forts and gunboats and with the ram Tennessee in Mobile Bay, 5 August 1864
Medal of Honor winner	Oliver Hughes	Army	Corporal	Company C, 12th Kentucky Volunteer Infantry Regiment	Battle of Jerusalem Plank Road, Virginia	Jun 24, 1864	Capture of flag of 11th South Carolina (C.S.A.).
—	John Hughey	Army	Corporal	Company L, 2nd Ohio Volunteer Cavalry Regiment	Battle of Sayler's Creek, Virginia	Apr 6, 1865	Capture of flag of 38th Virginia Infantry (C.S.A.).
Drawing of a white man with hair parted in the center and a mustache, wearing a suit coat over a shirt and tie.	Henry S. Huidekoper	Army	Lieutenant Colonel	150th Pennsylvania Infantry Regiment	Battle of Gettysburg, Pennsylvania	Jul 1, 1863	While engaged in repelling an attack of the enemy, received a severe wound of the right arm, but instead of retiring remained at the front in command of the regiment.
—	Louis T. Hunt	Army	Private	Company H, 6th Missouri Volunteer Infantry	Battle of Vicksburg, Mississippi	May 22, 1863	For gallantry in the charge of the volunteer storming party on 22 May 1863, in action at Vicksburg, Mississippi.
Medal of Honor winner	Charles A. Hunter	Army	Sergeant	Company E, 34th Massachusetts Volunteer Infantry Regiment	Third Battle of Petersburg, Virginia	Apr 2, 1865	In the assault on Fort Gregg, bore the regimental flag bravely and was among the foremost to enter the work.
Medal of Honor winner	John C. Hunterson	Army	Private	Company B, 3rd Pennsylvania Volunteer Cavalry	On the Peninsula, Virginia	Jun 5, 1862	While under fire, between the lines of the 2 armies, voluntarily gave up his own horse to an engineer officer whom he was accompanying on a reconnaissance and whose horse had been killed, thus enabling the officer to escape with valuable papers in his possession.
—	Michael Huskey	Navy	Fireman	(United States Navy) USS Carondelet	Aboard USS Carondelet	Mar 1863	Fireman on board USS Carondelet, Deer Creek Expedition, March 1863. Carrying out his duties gallantly, Huskey volunteered to aid in the rescue of the tug Ivy under the fire of the enemy, and set forth general meritorious conduct during this hazardous mission.
Medal of Honor winner	Theodore Hyatt	Army	First Sergeant	Company D, 127th Illinois Volunteer Infantry Regiment	Battle of Vicksburg, Mississippi	May 22, 1863	For gallantry in the charge of the volunteer storming party on 22 May 1863, in action at Vicksburg, Mississippi.
Medal of Honor winner	Thomas W. Hyde	Army	Major	7th Maine Volunteer Infantry	Battle of Antietam, Maryland	Sep 17, 1862	Led his regiment in an assault on a strong body of the enemy's infantry and kept up the fight until the greater part of his men had been killed or wounded, bringing the remainder safely out of the fight.
—	John Hyland	Navy	Seaman	(United States Navy) USS Signal	Aboard USS Signal, Red River Campaign	May 5, 1864	Served as seaman on board USS Signal which was attacked by field batteries and sharpshooters and destroyed in Red River, 5 May 1864.
Medal of Honor winner	Samuel Hymer	Army	Captain	Company D, 115th Illinois Volunteer Infantry Regiment	Buzzard's Roost Gap, Georgia	Oct 13, 1864	With only 41 men under his command (Company D, 115th Illinois Infantry), defended and held a blockhouse against the attack of Hood's Division for nearly 10 hours, thus checking the advance of the enemy and insuring the safety of the balance of the regiment, as well as that of the 8th Kentucky Infantry, then stationed at Ringgold, Georgia

== I ==
Recipients are listed alphabetically by last name. Posthumous receipt is denoted by an asterisk.

This along with the *, indicates that the Medal of Honor was awarded posthumously

Image	Name	Service	Rank	Unit/Command	Place of action	Date of action	Notes
Medal of Honor winner	Charles H. Ilgenfritz	Army	Sergeant	Company E, 207th Pennsylvania Infantry Regiment	Fort Sedgwick, Virginia	Apr 2, 1865	The color bearer falling, pierced by 7 balls, he immediately sprang forward and grasped the colors, planting them upon the enemy's forts amid a murderous fire of grape, canister, and musketry from the enemy.
	Lorenzo D. Immell	Army	Corporal	(United States) Company F, 2nd U.S. Artillery	Battle of Wilson's Creek, Missouri	Aug 10, 1861	Bravery in action
—	Lewis J. Ingalls	Army	Private	K, 8th Vermont Volunteer Infantry Regiment	Boutte Station, Louisiana	Sep 4, 1862	A railroad train guarded by about 60 men on flat cars having been sidetracked by a misplaced switch into an ambuscade of guerrillas who were rapidly shooting down the unprotected guards, this soldier, under a severe fire in which he was wounded, ran to another switch and, opening it, enabled the train and the surviving guards to escape.
	Leonidas H. Inscho	Army	Corporal	K, 12th Ohio Volunteer Infantry Regiment	Battle of South Mountain, Maryland	Sep 14, 1862	Alone and unaided and with his left hand disabled, captured a Confederate captain and four men.
—	Joseph Irlam	Navy	Seaman	(United States Navy) USS Brooklyn	Aboard USS Brooklyn, Battle of Mobile Bay	August 5, 1864	Stationed at the wheel on board USS Brooklyn during action against rebel forts and gunboats and with the ram Tennessee in Mobile Bay on 5 August 1864. When heavy enemy fire struck down several men at their guns and replacements were not available, Irlam voluntarily released two men who were stationed with him and carried on at the wheel with the assistance of only one of the crew throughout the battle.
Captain Francis Irsch of the 45th New York Infantry	Francis Irsch	Army	Captain	(New York (state)) Company D, 45th New York Volunteer Infantry	Battle of Gettysburg, Pennsylvania	Jul 1, 1863	Gallantry in flanking the enemy and capturing a number of prisoners and in holding a part of the town against heavy odds while the Army was rallying on Cemetery Hill.
—	John Irving	Navy	Coxswain	(United States Navy) USS Brooklyn	Aboard USS Brooklyn, Battle of Mobile Bay	August 5, 1864	On board USS Brooklyn during action against rebel forts and gunboats and with the ram Tennessee, in Mobile Bay, 5 August 1864.
—	Thomas Irving	Navy	Coxswain	(United States Navy) USS Lehigh	Aboard USS Lehigh, Charleston Harbor	November 16, 1863	Served on board USS Lehigh, Charleston Harbor, 16 November 1863, during the hazardous task of freeing Lehigh, which had grounded, and was under heavy enemy fire from Fort Moultrie. Rowing the small boat which was used in the hazardous task of transferring hawsers from Lehigh to Nahant. Irving twice succeeded in making the trip, while under severe fire from the enemy, only to find that each had been in vain when the hawsers were cut by hostile fire and chafing.
—	Nicholas Irwin	Navy	Seaman	(United States Navy) USS Brooklyn	Aboard USS Brooklyn, Battle of Mobile Bay	August 5, 1864	On board USS Brooklyn during action against rebel forts and gunboats and with the ram Tennessee, in Mobile Bay, 5 August 1864. Despite severe damage to his ship and the loss of several men on board as enemy fire raked her decks from stem to stern, Irwin fought his gun with skill and courage throughout the furious battle which resulted in the surrender of the prize rebel ram Tennessee and in the damaging and destruction of batteries at Fort Morgan.
	Patrick Irwin	Army	First Sergeant	Company H, 14th Michigan Volunteer Infantry Regiment	Jonesboro, Georgia	Sep 1, 1864	In a charge by the 14th Michigan Infantry against the entrenched enemy was the first man over the line of works of the enemy, and demanded and received the surrender of Confederate Gen. Daniel Govan and his command.

== J ==
Recipients are listed alphabetically by last name. Posthumous receipt is denoted by an asterisk.

This along with the *, indicates that the Medal of Honor was awarded posthumously

Image	Name	Service	Rank	Unit/Command	Place of action	Date of action	Notes
Frederick R. Jackson	Frederick R. Jackson	Army	First Sergeant	Company F, 7th Regiment Connecticut Volunteer Infantry	Battle of James Island, South Carolina	Jun 16, 1862	For extraordinary heroism on 16 June 1862, in action at James Island, South Carolina. Having his left arm shot away in a charge on the enemy, First Sergeant Jackson continued on duty, taking part in a second and a third charge until he fell exhausted from the loss of blood.
—	Eugene P. Jacobson	Army	Sergeant Major	(New York (state)) 74th New York Volunteer Infantry Regiment	Battle of Chancellorsville, Virginia	May 2, 1863	For extraordinary heroism on 2 May 1863, in action at Chancellorsville, Virginia, for bravery in conducting a scouting party in front of the enemy.
—	Isaac James	Army	Private	Company H, 110th Ohio Volunteer Infantry	Third Battle of Petersburg, Virginia	Apr 2, 1865	For extraordinary heroism on 2 April 1865, in action at Petersburg, Virginia, for capture of flag.
—	John H. James	Navy	Captain of the Top	(United States Navy) USS Richmond	Aboard USS Richmond, Battle of Mobile Bay	August 5, 1864	For extraordinary heroism in action, serving as Captain of a gun on board the USS Richmond during action against rebel forts and gunboats and with the ram Tennessee in Mobile Bay, 5 August 1864. Despite damage to his ship and the loss of several men on board as enemy fire raked her decks, Captain of the Top James fought his gun with skill and courage throughout a furious two-hour battle which resulted in the surrender of the rebel ram Tennessee and in the damaging and destruction of batteries at Fort Morgan.
—	Miles James	Army	Corporal	Company B, 36th United States Colored Infantry Regiment	Battle of Chaffin's Farm, Virginia	Sep 30, 1864	For extraordinary heroism on 30 September 1864, in action at Chapin's Farm, Virginia. Having had his arm mutilated, making immediate amputation necessary, Corporal James loaded and discharged his piece with one hand and urged his men forward; this within 30 yards of the enemy's works.
Head and shoulders of a white man with parted hair and a large mustache, wearing a star-shaped medal from a ribbon around his neck.	Walter Jamieson	Army	First Sergeant	(New York (state)) Company B, 139th New York Volunteer Infantry Regiment	Battle of the Crater, Petersburg, Virginia and Fort Harrison, Battle of Chaffin's Farm, Virginia	Jul 30, 1864 and Sep 29, 1864	For extraordinary heroism on 30 July 1864. First Sergeant Jamieson voluntarily went between the lines under a heavy fire at Petersburg, Virginia, to the assistance of a wounded and helpless officer, whom he carried within the Union lines. At Fort Harrison, Virginia, 29 September 1864, he seized the regimental color, the Color Bearer and guard having been shot down, and, rushing forward, planted it upon the fort in full view of the entire brigade.
	James Jardine	Army	Sergeant	Company F, 54th Ohio Volunteer Infantry Regiment	Battle of Vicksburg, Mississippi	May 22, 1863	For gallantry in the charge of the volunteer storming party on 22 May 1863, in action at Vicksburg, Mississippi.
Medal of Honor winner	Benjamin H. Jellison	Army	Sergeant	Company C, 19th Massachusetts Volunteer Infantry Regiment	Battle of Gettysburg, Pennsylvania	Jul 3, 1863	For extraordinary heroism on 3 July 1863, in action at Gettysburg, Pennsylvania, for capture of flag of 57th Virginia Infantry (C.S.A.). He also assisted in taking prisoners.
—	Thomas Jenkins	Navy	Seaman	(United States Navy) USS Cincinnati	Aboard USS Cincinnati, Operations against Vicksburg	May 27, 1863	For extraordinary heroism in action while serving on board the USS Cincinnati during the attack on the Vicksburg (Mississippi) batteries and at the time of her sinking, 27 May 1863. Engaging the enemy in a fierce battle, the Cincinnati, amidst an incessant fire of shot and shell, continued to fire her guns to the last, though so penetrated by shell fire that her fate was sealed. Serving bravely during this action, Seaman Jenkins was conspicuously cool under the fire of the enemy, never ceasing to fight until this proud ship went down, "her colors nailed to the mast."
—	James T. Jennings	Army	Private	Company K, 56th Pennsylvania Infantry Regiment	Battle of Globe Tavern, Virginia	Aug 20, 1864	For extraordinary heroism on 20 August 1864, in action at Weldon Railroad, Virginia, for capture of flag of 55th North Carolina Infantry (Confederate States of America).
Medal of Honor winner	Erastus W. Jewett	Army	First Lieutenant	Company A, 9th Vermont Volunteer Infantry Regiment	Newport Barracks, North Carolina	Feb 2, 1864	For extraordinary heroism on 2 February 1864, in action at Newport Barracks, North Carolina. By long and persistent resistance and burning the bridges, First Lieutenant Jewett kept a superior force of the enemy at a distance and thus covered the retreat of the garrison.
—	William John	Army	Private	Company E, 37th Ohio Volunteer Infantry Regiment	Battle of Vicksburg, Mississippi	May 22, 1863	For gallantry in the charge of the volunteer storming party on 22 May 1863, in action at Vicksburg, Mississippi.
	Franklin Johndro	Army	Private	(New York (state)) Company A, 118th New York Volunteer Infantry	Battle of Chaffin's Farm, Virginia	Sep 30, 1864	For extraordinary heroism on 30 September 1864, in action at Chapin's Farm, Virginia, in the capture of 40 prisoners.
	Elisha Johns	Army	Corporal	Company B, 113th Illinois Volunteer Infantry	Battle of Vicksburg, Mississippi	May 22, 1863	For gallantry in the charge of the volunteer storming party on 22 May 1863, in action at Vicksburg, Mississippi.
Medal of Honor winner	Henry T. Johns	Army	Private	Company C, 49th Massachusetts Infantry Regiment	Siege of Port Hudson, Louisiana	May 27, 1863	For extraordinary heroism on 27 May 1863, in action at Port Hudson, Louisiana. Private Johns volunteered in response to a call and took part in the movement that was made upon the enemy's works under a heavy fire there from in advance of the general assault.
Medal of Honor winner	Andrew Johnson	Army	Private	Company G, 116th Illinois Volunteer Infantry Regiment	Battle of Vicksburg, Mississippi	May 22, 1863	For gallantry in the charge of the volunteer storming party on 22 May 1863, in action at Vicksburg, Mississippi.
—	Follett Johnson	Army	Corporal	(New York (state)) Company H, 60th New York Volunteer Infantry	Battle of New Hope Church, Georgia	May 27, 1864	For extraordinary heroism on 27 May 1864, in action at New Hope Church, Georgia. Corporal Johnson voluntarily exposed himself to the fire of a Confederate sharpshooter, thus drawing fire upon himself and enabling his comrade to shoot the sharpshooter.
—	Henry Johnson	Navy	Seaman	(United States Navy) USS Metacomet	Aboard USS Metacomet, Battle of Mobile Bay	August 5, 1864	For extraordinary heroism in action, serving as Seaman on board the USS Metacomet, Johnson served as a member of the boat's crew which went to the rescue of the U.S. Monitor Tecumseh when that vessel was struck by a torpedo in passing the enemy forts in Mobile Bay, Alabama, 5 August 1864. He braved the enemy fire which was said by the admiral to be "one of the most galling" he had ever seen, and aided in rescuing from death ten of the crew of the Tecumseh, thereby eliciting the admiration of both friend and foe.
Head and shoulders of a white man with a mustache and receding hairline, wearing a dark suit and tie with three medals hanging from ribbons on the left breast. The portrait is surrounded by a decorative oval frame.	John Johnson	Army	Private	Company D, 2nd Wisconsin Volunteer Infantry Regiment	Battle of Fredericksburg, Virginia	Sep 17, 1862 and Dec 13, 1862	For conspicuous gallantry on 13 December 1862, in battle in which he was severely wounded in action at Fredericksburg, Virginia. While serving as cannoneer Private Johnson manned the positions of fallen gunners.
Medal of Honor winner	Joseph E. Johnson	Army	First Lieutenant	Company A, 58th Pennsylvania Infantry	Fort Harrison, Battle of Chaffin's Farm, Virginia	Sep 29, 1864	For extraordinary heroism on 29 September 1864, in action at Fort Harrison, Virginia. Though twice severely wounded while advancing in the assault, First Lieutenant Johnson disregarded his injuries and was among the first to enter the fort, where he was wounded for the third time.
Medal of Honor winner	Ruel M. Johnson	Army	Major	100th Indiana Infantry Regiment	Chattanooga, Tennessee	Nov 25, 1863	For extraordinary heroism on 25 November 1863, in action at Chattanooga, Tennessee. While in command of the regiment Major Johnson bravely exposed himself to the fire of the enemy, encouraging and cheering his men.
—	Samuel Johnson	Army	Private	Company C, 9th Pennsylvania Reserve Regiment	Battle of Antietam, Maryland	Sep 17, 1862	For extraordinary heroism on 17 September 1862, in action at Antietam, Maryland, for individual bravery and daring in capturing from the enemy two colors of the 1st Texas Rangers (Confederate States of America), receiving in the act a severe wound..
Medal of Honor winner	Wallace W. Johnson	Army	Sergeant	Company C, 6th Pennsylvania Reserve Regiment	Battle of Gettysburg, Pennsylvania	Jul 2, 1863	For extraordinary heroism on 2 July 1863, in action at Gettysburg, Pennsylvania. With five other volunteers Sergeant Johnson gallantly charged on a number of the enemy's sharpshooters concealed in a log house, captured them, and brought them into the Union lines.
—	David Johnston	Army	Private	Company K, 8th Missouri Volunteer Infantry	Battle of Vicksburg, Mississippi	May 22, 1863	For gallantry in the charge of the volunteer storming party on 22 May 1863, in action at Vicksburg, Mississippi.
—	William P. Johnston	Navy	Landsman	(United States Navy) USS Fort Hindman	Aboard the USS Fort Hindman, near Harrisonburg, Louisiana	Mar 2, 1864	For extraordinary heroism on board the USS Fort Hindman during the engagement near Harrisonburg, La., 2 March 1864. Badly wounded in the hand during the action, Johnston, despite his wound, took the place of another man to sponge and lead one of the guns throughout the entire action in which the Fort Hindman was raked severely with shot and shell from the enemy guns.
Medal of Honor winner	Willie Johnston	Army	Drummer	Company D, 3rd Vermont Volunteer Infantry Regiment	Seven Days Battle, Richmond, Virginia Peninsular Campaign 1862	Between June 25 and July 1, 1862	Twelve years old, the youngest to receive the Medal of Honor. For gallantry from June 26 to 1 July 1862, in action during the Seven Days Battle and the Peninsula Campaign, Virginia.
—	Andrew Jones	Navy	Chief Boatswain's Mate	(United States Navy) USS Chickasaw	Aboard USS Chickasaw, Battle of Mobile Bay	August 5, 1864	for extraordinary heroism in action, serving as Chief Boatswain's Mate on board the U.S. Ironclad, USS Chickasaw, Mobile Bay, Alabama, 5 August 1864. Although his enlistment was up, Chief Boatswain's Mate Jones volunteered for the battle of Mobile Bay, going on board the Chickasaw from the USS Vincennes where he then carried out his duties gallantly throughout the engagement with the enemy which resulted in the capture of the rebel ram Tennessee.
—	David Jones	Army	Private	Company I, 54th Ohio Volunteer Infantry Regiment	Battle of Vicksburg, Mississippi	May 22, 1863	For gallantry in the charge of the volunteer storming party on 22 May 1863, in action at Vicksburg, Mississippi.
Head and shoulders of a white man with a wide bushy mustache, wearing a bow tie and dark suit with a medal pinned to the left breast. The portrait is surrounded by a circular frame and images of flowers.	John Jones	Navy	Landsman	(United States Navy)	Aboard USS Rhode Island, loss of USS Monitor	December 30, 1862	For extraordinary heroism in action while serving on board USS USS Rhode Island, which was engaged in saving the lives of the officers and crew of USS Monitor, 30 December 1862. Participating in the hazardous rescue of the officers and crew of the sinking Monitor, Landsman Jones, after rescuing several of the men, became separated in a heavy gale with other members of the cutter that had set out from the Rhode Island, and spent many hours in the small boat at the mercy of the weather and high seas until finally picked up by a schooner 50 miles east of Cape Hatteras.
—	John E. Jones	Navy	Quartermaster	(United States Navy) USS Oneida	Aboard USS Oneida, Battle of Mobile Bay	August 5, 1864	For extraordinary heroism in action while serving Quartermaster on board the USS Oneida in the engagement at Mobile Bay, Alabama, 5 August 1864. Stationed at the wheel during the fierce action, Quartermaster Jones, though wounded, carried out his duties gallantly by going to the poop to assist at the signals after the wheel ropes were shot away and remained there until ordered to reeve new wheel ropes.
—	Thomas Jones	Navy	Coxswain	(United States Navy) USS Ticonderoga	Aboard USS Ticonderoga, First and Second Battles of Fort Fisher	Dec 1864 – Jan 1865	For extraordinary heroism in action while serving on board the USS Ticonderoga during attacks on Fort Fisher, North Carolina, 24 and 25 December 1864; and 13 to 15 January 1865. Despite heavy return fire by the enemy and the explosion of the 100-pounder Parrott rifle which killed eight men and wounded 12 more, Coxswain Jones, as Captain of a gun, performed his duties with skill and courage during the first two days of battle. As his ship again took position on the line on the 13th, he remained steadfast as the Ticonderoga maintained a well-placed fire upon the batteries on shore, and thereafter, as she materially lessened the power of guns on the mound which had been turned upon our assaulting columns. During this action the flag was planted on one side of the strongest fortifications possessed by the rebels.
—	William Jones	Navy	Captain of the Top	(United States Navy) USS Richmond	Aboard USS Richmond, Battle of Mobile Bay	August 5, 1864	For extraordinary heroism in action while serving as captain of a gun on board USS Richmond during action against rebel forts and gunboats and with the ram Tennessee in Mobile Bay, 5 August 1864.
—	William Jones	Army	First Sergeant	(New York (state)) Company A, 73rd New York Volunteer Infantry Regiment	Battle of Spotsylvania Court House, Virginia	May 12, 1864	For extraordinary heroism on 12 May 1864, in action at Spotsylvania, Virginia, for capture of flag of 65th Virginia Infantry (Confederate States of America).
	Absalom Jordan	Army	Corporal	Company A, 3rd Indiana Volunteer Cavalry Regiment	Battle of Sayler's Creek, Virginia	Apr 6, 1865	For extraordinary heroism on 6 April 1865, in action at (Sailor's Creek), Virginia, for capture of flag.
—	Robert Jordan	Navy	Coxswain	(United States Navy) USS Mount Washington	Aboard USS Mount Washington, Siege of Suffolk	April 14, 1863	For extraordinary heroism in action while attached to the USS Minnesota and temporarily serving on the USS Mount Washington, during action against the enemy in the Nansemond River, Virginia, 14 April 1863. When the Mount Washington drifted against the bank following several successive hits which struck her boilers and stopped her engines, Coxswain Jordan boarded the stricken vessel and, for six hours as fierce artillery and musketry continued to rake her decks, calmly assisted in manning a 12-pound howitzer which had been mounted on the open hurricane deck.
—	Thomas Jordan	Navy	Quartermaster	(United States Navy) USS Galena	Aboard USS Galena, Battle of Mobile Bay	August 5, 1864	For extraordinary heroism in action while serving on board the USS Galena during the attack on enemy forts at Mobile Bay, Alabama, 5 August 1864. Securely lashed to the side of the Oneida which had suffered the loss of her steering apparatus and an explosion of her boiler from enemy fire, the Galena aided the stricken vessel past the enemy forts to safety. Despite heavy damage to his ship from raking enemy fire, Quartermaster Jordan performed his duties with skill and courage throughout the action.
Medal of Honor winner	Simeon T. Josselyn	Army	First Lieutenant	Company C, 13th Illinois Volunteer Infantry Regiment	Battle of Missionary Ridge, Tennessee	Nov 25, 1863	Missionary Ridge, Tennessee. While commanding his company, deployed as skirmishers, First Lieutenant Josselyn came upon a large body of the enemy, taking a number of them prisoner. Lieutenant Josselyn himself shot their Color Bearer, seized the colors and brought them back to his regiment.
—	Francis W. Judge	Army	First Sergeant	(New York (state)) Company K, 79th New York Volunteer Infantry	Battle of Fort Sanders, Knoxville, Tennessee	Nov 29, 1863	The color bearer of the 51st Georgia Infantry. (C.S.A.), having planted his flag upon the side of the work, Sgt. Judge leaped from his position of safety, sprang upon the parapet, and in the face of a concentrated fire seized the flag and returned with it in safety to the fort.

== K ==
Recipients are listed alphabetically by last name. Posthumous receipt is denoted by an asterisk.

This along with the *, indicates that the Medal of Honor was awarded posthumously

Image	Name	Service	Rank	Unit/Command	Place of action	Date of action	Notes
—	John Kaiser	Army	Sergeant	(United States) Company E, 2nd U.S. Artillery Regiment	Richmond, Virginia	Jun 27, 1862	For gallant and meritorious service on 27 June 1862, in action during the Seven Day Battle before Richmond, Virginia.
—	Luther Kaltenbach	Army	Corporal	Company F, 12th Iowa Volunteer Infantry Regiment	Battle of Nashville, Tennessee	Dec 16, 1864	For extraordinary heroism on 16 December 1864, in action at Nashville, Tennessee, for capture of flag of 44th Mississippi Infantry (Confederate States of America).
—	John Kane	Army	Corporal	(New York (state)) Company K, 100th New York Volunteer Infantry	Third Battle of Petersburg, Virginia	Apr 2, 1865	For extraordinary heroism on 2 April 1865, in action at Petersburg, Virginia, for gallantry as Color Bearer in the assault on Fort Gregg.
—	Thomas Kane	Navy	Captain of the Hold	(United States Navy) USS Nereus	Aboard USS Nereus, Second Battle of Fort Fisher	Jan 15, 1865	For extraordinary heroism in action while serving on board the USS Nereus during the attack on Fort Fisher, North Carolina, on 15 January 1865. Thomas Kane, as Captain of the Hold, displayed outstanding skill and courage as his ship maintained its well-directed fire against fortifications on shore despite the enemy's return fire. When a rebel steamer was discovered in the river back of the fort, the Nereus, with forward rifle guns trained, drove the ship off at the third fire. The gallant ship's participation contributed to the planting of the flag on one of the strongest fortifications possessed by the rebels.
Head and shoulders of a white man with dark hair and a neatly trimmed Van Dyke mustache and beard, wearing a plain dark jacket.	Peter Kappesser	Army	Private	(New York (state)) Company B, 149th New York Volunteer Infantry Regiment	Battle of Lookout Mountain, Tennessee	Nov 24, 1863	For extraordinary heroism on 24 November 1863, in action at Lookout Mountain, Tennessee, for capture of Confederate flag (Bragg's army).
Medal of Honor winner	Leopold Karpeles	Army	Sergeant	Company E, 57th Massachusetts Infantry Regiment	Battle of the Wilderness, Virginia	May 6, 1864	For extraordinary heroism on 6 May 1864, in action during the Wilderness Campaign, Virginia. While Color Bearer, Sergeant Karpeles rallied the retreating troops and induced them to check the enemy's advance.
—	August Kauss	Army	Corporal	(New York (state)) Company H, 15th New York Heavy Artillery	Battle of Five Forks, Virginia	Apr 1, 1865	For extraordinary heroism on 1 April 1865, in action at Five Forks, Virginia, for capture of battle flag.. Last name sometimes spelled "Kautz"
Medal of Honor winner	Joseph Keele	Army	Sergeant Major	(New York (state)) 182nd New York Volunteer Infantry	Battle of North Anna, Virginia	May 23, 1864	For extraordinary heroism on 23 May 1864, in action at North Anna River, Virginia. Voluntarily and at the risk of his life carried orders to the brigade commander, which resulted in saving the works his regiment was defending.
Medal of Honor winner	Joseph S. Keen	Army	Sergeant	Company D, 13th Michigan Volunteer Infantry Regiment	near Chattahoochee River, Georgia	Oct 1, 1864	For extraordinary heroism on 1 October 1864, in action at Chattahoochee River, Georgia. While an escaped prisoner of war within the enemy's lines, Sergeant Keen witnessed an important movement of the enemy, and at great personal risk made his way through the enemy's lines and brought news of the movement to Sherman's army.
—	Joseph Keene	Army	Private	(New York (state)) 26th New York Volunteer Infantry Regiment	Battle of Fredericksburg, Virginia	Dec 13, 1862	For extraordinary heroism on 13 December 1862, in action at Fredericksburg, Virginia. Private Keene voluntarily seized the colors after several Color Bearers had been shot down and led the regiment in the charge.
Medal of Honor winner	Andrew J. Kelley	Army	Private	Company E, 17th Michigan Volunteer Infantry Regiment	Siege of Knoxville, Tennessee	Nov 20, 1863	For extraordinary heroism on 20 November 1863, in action at Fort Sanders, Knoxville, Tennessee. Having voluntarily accompanied a small party to destroy buildings within the enemy's lines whence sharpshooters had been firing, disregarded an order to retire, remained and completed the firing of the buildings, thus insuring their total destruction; this at the imminent risk of his life from the fire of the advancing enemy.
	George V. Kelley	Army	Captain	Company A, 104th Ohio Volunteer Infantry Regiment	Battle of Franklin, Tennessee	Nov 30, 1864	For extraordinary heroism on 30 November 1864, in action at Franklin, Tennessee, for capture of flag supposed to be of Cheatham's Corps (C.S.A.).
—	John Kelley	Navy	Second Class Fireman	(United States Navy) USS Ceres	Aboard USS Ceres	July 9, 1862	For extraordinary heroism in action as Second Class Fireman on board the USS Ceres in the fight near Hamilton, Roanoke River, North Carolina, 9 July 1862. When his ship was fired on by the enemy with small arms, Second Class Fireman Kelley returned the raking fire, courageously carrying out his duties through the engagement and was spoken of for good conduct and cool bravery under enemy fires, by the commanding officer.
Medal of Honor winner	Leverett M. Kelley	Army	Sergeant	Company A, 36th Regiment Illinois Volunteer Infantry	Battle of Missionary Ridge, Tennessee	Nov 25, 1863	For extraordinary heroism on 25 November 1863, in action at Missionary Ridge, Tennessee. Sergeant Kelley sprang over the works just captured from the enemy, and calling upon his comrades to follow, rushed forward in the face of a deadly fire and was among the first over the works on the summit, where he compelled the surrender of a Confederate officer and received his sword.
Head and shoulders of an older black man with short hair and extremely long, bushy sideburns connecting to a mustache. He is wearing a suit coat, vest, and tie.	Alexander Kelly	Army	First Sergeant	Company F, 6th United States Colored Infantry Regiment	Battle of Chaffin's Farm, Virginia	Sep 29, 1864	For extraordinary heroism on 29 September 1864, in action at Chapin's Farm, Virginia. First Sergeant Kelly gallantly seized the colors, which had fallen near the enemy's lines of abatis, raised them and rallied the men at a time of confusion and in a place of the greatest danger.
—	Daniel Kelly	Army	Sergeant	(New York (state)) Company G, 8th New York Volunteer Cavalry Regiment	Battle of Waynesboro, Virginia	Mar 2, 1865	For extraordinary heroism on 2 March 1865, in action at Waynesboro, Virginia, for capture of flag.
—	Thomas Kelly	Army	Private	(New York (state)) Company A, 6th New York Volunteer Cavalry	Front Royal, Virginia	Aug 16, 1864	For extraordinary heroism on 16 August 1864, in action at Front Royal, Virginia, for capture of flag.
	Joseph Kemp	Army	First Sergeant	Company D, 5th Michigan Volunteer Infantry Regiment	Battle of the Wilderness, Virginia	May 6, 1864	For extraordinary heroism on 6 May 1864, in action during the Wilderness Campaign, Virginia, for capture of flag of 31st North Carolina (Confederate States of America) in a personal encounter.
Medal of Honor winner	William W. Kendall	Army	First Sergeant	Company A, 49th Indiana Infantry Regiment	Black River Bridge, Mississippi	May 17, 1863	For extraordinary heroism on 17 May 1863, in action at Black River Bridge, Mississippi. First Sergeant Kendall voluntarily led the company in a charge and was the first to enter the enemy's works, taking a number of prisoners.
—	Thomas Kendrick	Navy	Coxswain	(United States Navy) USS Oneida	Aboard USS Oneida, Battle of Mobile Bay	August 5, 1864	For extraordinary heroism in action, serving as Coxswain on board the USS Oneida in the engagement at Mobile Bay, Alabama, 5 August 1864. Volunteering for the Mobile Bay action from Bienville, Coxswain Kendrick displayed courageous devotion to duty, and his excellent conduct throughout the battle which resulted in the capture of the rebel ram Tennessee and in the damaging of Fort Morgan, attracted the attention of the commanding officer and those serving around him.
—	Barnett Kenna	Navy	Quartermaster	(United States Navy) USS Brooklyn	Aboard USS Brooklyn, Battle of Mobile Bay	August 5, 1864	For extraordinary heroism in action, serving as Coxswain on board the USS Brooklyn during action against rebel forts and gunboats and with the ram Tennessee, in Mobile Bay, 5 August 1864.
—	John Kennedy	Army	Private	(United States) Company M, 2nd U.S. Artillery Regiment	Battle of Trevilian Station, Virginia	Jun 11, 1864	Remained at his gun, resisting with its implements the advancing cavalry, and thus secured the retreat of his detachment.
—	Charles Kenyon	Navy	Fireman	(United States Navy) USS Galena	Aboard USS Galena, Drewry's Bluff	May 15, 1862	For extraordinary heroism in action, serving as Fireman on board the USS Galena in the attack upon Drewry's Bluff, 15 May 1862. Severely burned while extricating a priming wire which had become bent and fixed in the bow gun while his ship underwent terrific shelling from the enemy, Kenyon hastily dressed his hands with cotton waste and oil and courageously returned to his gun while enemy sharpshooters in rifle pits along the banks continued to direct their fire at the men at the guns.
medal of honor winner	John Snyders Kenyon	Army	Sergeant	(New York (state)) Company D, 3rd New York Volunteer Cavalry	Trenton, North Carolina	May 15, 1862	For extraordinary heroism on 15 May 1862, in action at Trenton, North Carolina. Sergeant Kenyon voluntarily left a retiring column, returned in face of the enemy's fire, helped a wounded man upon a horse, and so enable him to escape capture or death.
—	Samuel P. Kenyon	Army	Private	(New York (state)) Company B, 24th New York Volunteer Cavalry	Battle of Sayler's Creek, Virginia	Apr 6, 1865	For extraordinary heroism on 6 April 1865, in action at Deatonsville (Sailor's Creek), Virginia, for capture of battle flag.
—	John Keough	Army	Corporal	Company E, 67th Pennsylvania Infantry Regiment	Battle of Sayler's Creek, Virginia	Apr 6, 1865	For extraordinary heroism on 6 April 1865, in action at Deatonsville (Sailor's Creek), Virginia, for capture of battle flag of 50th Georgia Infantry (C.S.A.).
medal of honor winner	James Kephart	Army	Private	(United States) Company C, 13th U.S. Infantry	Battle of Vicksburg, Mississippi	May 19, 1863	For extraordinary heroism on 19 May 1863, in action at Vicksburg, Mississippi. Private Kephart voluntarily and at the risk of his life, under a severe fire of the enemy, aided and assisted to the rear an officer who had been severely wounded and left on the field.
Medal of Honor winner	Thomas R. Kerr	Army	Captain	Company C, 14th Pennsylvania Cavalry	Moorfield, West Virginia	Aug 7, 1864	For extraordinary heroism on 7 August 1864, in action at Moorefield, West Virginia. After being most desperately wounded, Captain Kerr captured the colors of the 8th Virginia Cavalry (C.S.A.).
Medal of Honor winner	John Kiggins	Army	Sergeant	(New York (state)) Company D, 149th New York Infantry	Battle of Lookout Mountain, Tennessee	Nov 24, 1863	For extraordinary heroism on 24 November 1863, in action at Lookout Mountain, Tennessee. Sergeant Kiggins waved the colors to save the lives of the men who were being fired upon by their own batteries, and thereby drew upon himself a concentrated fire from the enemy.
—	Joseph Kimball	Army	Private	Company B, 2nd West Virginia Volunteer Cavalry Regiment	Battle of Sayler's Creek, Virginia	Apr 6, 1865	For extraordinary heroism on 6 April 1865, in action at Deatonsville (Sailor's Creek), Virginia, for capture of flag of 6th North Carolina Infantry (C.S.A.).
—	John M. Kindig	Army	Corporal	Company A, 63rd Pennsylvania Infantry Regiment	Battle of Spotsylvania Court House, Virginia	May 12, 1864	For extraordinary heroism on 12 May 1864, in action at Spotsylvania, Virginia, for capture of flag of 28th North Carolina Infantry. (C.S.A.).
Portrait of a middle-aged to elderly white man with a large mustache in a suit.	Horatio C. King	Army	Major and Quartermaster	(United States) U.S. Volunteers	Battle of Dinwiddie Court House, Virginia	Mar 31, 1865	Dinwiddie Courthouse, Virginia. While serving as a volunteer aide, Major King carried orders to the reserve brigade and participated with it in the charge which repulsed the enemy.
Medal of Honor winner	Robert Henry King	Navy	Landsman	(United States Navy) Picket Boat No. 1	Aboard U.S. Picket Boat No. 1	October 27, 1864	King served on board the U.S. Picket Boat No. 1, in action, 27 October 1864, against the Confederate ram, CSS Albemarle, which had resisted repeated attacks by our steamers and had kept a large force of vessels employed in watching her.
Head and shoulders of a white man with a drooping mustache, wearing a military jacket with shoulder boards, one medal at the neck, and a row of medals across the entire chest.	Rufus King, Jr.	Army	First Lieutenant	(United States) 4th U.S. Artillery Regiment	Battle of White Oak Swamp, Virginia	Jun 30, 1862	This officer, when his captain was wounded, succeeded to the command of two batteries while engaged against a superior force of the enemy and fought his guns most gallantly until compelled to retire.
—	Samuel W. Kinnaird	Navy	Landsman	(United States Navy) USS Lackawanna	Aboard USS Lackawanna, Battle of Mobile Bay	August 5, 1864	Served as a landsman on board USS USS Lackawanna during successful attacks against Fort Morgan, rebel gunboats and the ram Tennessee in Mobile Bay, 5 August 1864.
—	John Kinsey	Army	Corporal	Company B, 45th Pennsylvania Infantry Regiment	Battle of Spotsylvania Court House, Virginia	May 18, 1864	For extraordinary heroism on 18 May 1864, in action at Spotsylvania, Virginia. Corporal Kinsey seized the colors, the Color Bearer having been shot, and with great gallantry succeeded in saving them from capture.
Medal of Honor winner Dennis Thomas Kirby	Dennis T. Kirby	Army	Major	8th Missouri Volunteer Infantry	Battle of Vicksburg, Mississippi	May 22, 1863	For extraordinary heroism on 22 May 1863, in action at Vicksburg, Mississippi. Major Kirby seized the colors when the Color Bearer was killed and bore them himself in the assault.
—	Jonathan C. Kirk	Army	Captain	Company F, 20th Indiana Infantry Regiment	Battle of North Anna, Virginia	May 23, 1864	For extraordinary heroism on 23 May 1864, in action at North Anna River, Virginia. Captain Kirk volunteered for dangerous service and single-handedly captured 13 armed Confederate soldiers and marched them to the rear.
—	Harry Kline	Army	Private	(New York (state)) Company E, 40th New York Volunteer Infantry Regiment	Battle of Sayler's Creek, Virginia	Apr 6, 1865	For extraordinary heroism on 6 April 1865, in action at Deatonsville (Sailor's Creek), Virginia, for capture of battle flag.
—	Charles H. Kloth	Army	Private	, Chicago Mercantile Battery, Illinois Light Artillery	Battle of Vicksburg, Mississippi	May 22, 1863	For extraordinary heroism on 22 May 1863, in action at Vicksburg, Mississippi. Private Kloth carried, with others, by hand, a cannon up to and fired it through an embrasure of the enemy's works.
Medal of Honor winner Charles H. Knight	Charles H. Knight	Army	Corporal	Company I, 9th New Hampshire Volunteer Infantry Regiment	Petersburg, Virginia	July 30, 1864	For extraordinary heroism on 30 July 1864, in action at Petersburg, Virginia. In company with a sergeant, Corporal Knight was the first to enter the exploded mine; was wounded but took several prisoners to the Federal lines.
William J. Knight	William James Knight	Army	Private	Company E, 21st Ohio Volunteer Infantry	Georgia	Apr 1862	For extraordinary heroism on April, 1862, in action during the Andrew's Raid in Georgia. Private Knight was one of the 19 of 22 men (including two civilians) who, by direction of General Mitchell (or Buell), penetrated nearly 200 miles south into enemy territory and captured a railroad train at Big Shanty, Georgia, in an attempt to destroy the bridges and track between Chattanooga and Atlanta.
Medal of Honor winner Abiather J. Knowles	Abiather J. Knowles	Army	Private	Company D, 2nd Maine Volunteer Infantry	First Battle of Bull Run, Virginia	Jul 21, 1861	For extraordinary heroism on 21 July 1861, in action at Bull Run, Virginia. Private Knowles removed dead and wounded under heavy fire.
medal of honor winner Edward Martin Knox	Edward M. Knox	Army	Second Lieutenant	(New York (state)) 15th Independent Battery, New York Volunteer Light Artillery	Battle of Gettysburg, Pennsylvania	Jul 2, 1863	For extraordinary heroism on 2 July 1863, in action at Gettysburg, Pennsylvania. Second Lieutenant Knox held his ground with the battery after the other batteries had fallen back until compelled to draw his piece off by hand; he was severely wounded.
Medal of Honor winner Jacob Koogle	Jacob Koogle	Army	First Lieutenant	Company G, 7th Regiment Maryland Volunteer Infantry	Battle of Five Forks, Virginia	Apr 1, 1865	For extraordinary heroism on 1 April 1865, in action at Five Forks, Virginia, for capture of battle flag.
Medal of Honor winner John S. Kountz	John S. Kountz	Army	Musician	Company G, 37th Ohio Volunteer Infantry Regiment	Battle of Missionary Ridge, Tennessee	Nov 25, 1863	For extraordinary heroism on 25 November 1863, in action at Missionary Ridge, Tennessee. Musician Kountz seized a musket and joined in the charge in which he was severely wounded.
—	Theodore L. Kramer	Army	Private	Company G, 188th Pennsylvania Volunteer Infantry Regiment	Battle of Chaffin's Farm, Virginia	Sep 29, 1864	For extraordinary heroism on 29 September 1864, in action at Chapin's Farm, Virginia. Private Kramer took one of the first prisoners, a captain.
Medal of Honor winner George Kretsinger	George Kretsinger	Army	Private	, Chicago Mercantile Battery, Illinois Light Artillery	Battle of Vicksburg, Mississippi	May 22, 1863	For extraordinary heroism on 22 May 1863, in action at Vicksburg, Mississippi. Private Kretsinger carried, with others, by hand, a cannon up to and fired it through an embrasure of the enemy's works.
Medal of Honor winner Andrew Kuder	Andrew Kuder	Army	Second Lieutenant	(New York (state)) Company E, 8th New York Volunteer Cavalry Regiment	Battle of Waynesboro, Virginia	Mar 2, 1865	For extraordinary heroism on 2 March 1865, in action at Waynesboro, Virginia, for capture of flag.
—	Jeremiah Kuder	Army	Second Lieutenant	Company A, 74th Indiana Infantry Regiment	Jonesboro, Georgia	Sep 1, 1864	For extraordinary heroism on 1 September 1864, in action at Jonesboro, Georgia, for capture of flag of 8th and 19th Arkansas (Confederate States of America).

== L ==
Recipients are listed alphabetically by last name. Posthumous receipt is denoted by an asterisk.

This along with the *, indicates that the Medal of Honor was awarded posthumously

Image	Name	Service	Rank	Unit/Command	Place of action	Date of action	Notes
Medal of Honor	Joseph S. Labill	Army	Private	Company C, 6th Missouri Volunteer Infantry	Battle of Vicksburg, Mississippi	May 22, 1863	For gallantry in the charge of the volunteer storming party on 22 May 1863, in action at Vicksburg, Mississippi.
	George Ladd	Army	Private	(New York (state)) Company H, 22nd New York Volunteer Cavalry Regiment	Battle of Waynesboro, Virginia	Mar 2, 1865	Captured a standard bearer, his flag, horse and equipment.
—	John Lafferty	Navy	Fireman	(United States Navy) USS Wyalusing	Aboard USS Wyalusing	May 25, 1864	For extraordinary heroism in action while serving on board USS Wyalusing and participated in a plan to destroy the rebel ram Albemarle in Roanoke River, 25 May 1864. Volunteering for the hazardous mission, Lafferty participated in the transfer of two torpedoes across an island swamp and then served as sentry to keep guard of clothes and arms left by other members of the party. After being rejoined by others of the party who had been discovered before the plan could be completed, Lafferty succeeded in returning to the mother ship after spending 24 hours of discomfort in the rain and swamp.
—	Bartlett Laffey	Navy	Seaman	(United States Navy) USS Marmora	Yazoo City, Mississippi	Mar 5, 1864	Served on board USS Marmora off Yazoo City, Mississippi, 5 March 1864. Landed ashore with his howitzer gun and crew in the midst of battle and contributed to the turning back of the enemy.
—	William Laing	Army	Sergeant	(New York (state)) Company F, 158th New York Volunteer Infantry Regiment	Battle of Chaffin's Farm, Virginia	Sep 29, 1864	For extraordinary heroism on 29 September 1864, in action at Chapin's Farm, Virginia. Sergeant Laing was among the first to scale the parapet.
—	Daniel Lakin	Navy	Seaman	(United States Navy) USS Commodore Perry	Aboard USS Commodore Perry	October 3, 1862	For extraordinary heroism in action while serving on board USS Commodore Perry in the attack upon Franklin, Virginia, 3 October 1862. With enemy fire raking the deck of his ship and blockades thwarting her progress, Lakin remained at his post and performed his duties with skill and courage as Commodore Perry fought a gallant battle to silence many rebel batteries as she steamed down the Blackwater River.
—	James P. Landis	Army	Chief Bugler	1st Pennsylvania Cavalry Regiment (15th Reserves/44th Pennsylvania Volunteers)	Paines Crossroads, Virginia	Apr 5, 1865	For extraordinary heroism on 5 April 1865, in action at Paines Crossroads, Virginia, for capture of flag.
—	Morgan D. Lane	Army	Private	(United States) Signal Corps	near Jetersville, Virginia	Apr 6, 1865	For extraordinary heroism on 6 April 1865, in action at Jetersville, Virginia, for capture of flag of gunboat CSS Nansemond.
Medal of Honor	Aaron S. Lanfare	Army	First Lieutenant	Company B, 1st Regiment Connecticut Volunteer Cavalry	Battle of Sayler's Creek, Virginia	Apr 6, 1865	For extraordinary heroism on 6 April 1865, in action at Deatonsville (Sailor's Creek), Virginia, for capture of flag of 11th Florida Infantry (Confederate States of America). .
	J. C. Julius Langbein	Army	Musician	(New York (state)) Company B, 9th New York Volunteer Infantry Regiment	Camden, North Carolina	Apr 19, 1862	A drummer boy, 15 years of age, he voluntarily and under a heavy fire went to the aid of a wounded officer, procured medical assistance for him, and aided in carrying him to a place of safety.
—	John S. Lann	Navy	Landsman	(United States Navy) USS Magnolia	USS Magnolia Landing Party, Battle of Natural Bridge	Mar 5, 1865 – Mar 6, 1865	For extraordinary heroism in action while serving on as landsman on board USS Magnolia, St. Marks, Florida, 5 and 6 March, Lann served with the Army in charge of Navy howitzers during the attack on St. Marks and throughout this fierce engagement made remarkable efforts in assisting transport of the gun. His coolness and determination in standing by his gun while under the fire of the enemy were a credit to the service to which he belonged.
—	Smith Larimer	Army	Corporal	Company G 2nd Ohio Cavalry	Battle of Sayler's Creek, Virginia	Apr 6, 1865	For extraordinary heroism on 6 April 1865, in action at Deatonsville (Sailor's Creek), Virginia, for capture of flag of General Kershaw's headquarters.
—	James W. Larrabee	Army	Corporal	Company I, 55th Illinois Volunteer Infantry Regiment	Battle of Vicksburg, Mississippi	May 22, 1863	For gallantry in the charge of the volunteer storming party on 22 May 1863, in action at Vicksburg, Mississippi.
Medal of Honor	Gaines Lawson	Army	First Sergeant	Company D, 4th Tennessee Infantry	Minville, Tennessee	Oct 3, 1863	Went to the aid of a wounded comrade between the lines and carried him to a place of safety.
Head and shoulders of an older black man with short hair and a mustache, wearing a suit coat with three medals hanging from ribbons on the left breast.	John Lawson	Navy	Landsman	(United States Navy) USS Hartford	Aboard USS Hartford, Battle of Mobile Bay	Aug 5, 1864	For extraordinary heroism in action while serving on board the flagship USS Hartford during successful attacks against Fort Morgan, rebel gunboats and the ram Tennessee in Mobile Bay, Alabama, on 5 August 1864. Wounded in the leg and thrown violently against the side of the ship when an enemy shell killed or wounded the six-man crew as the shell whipped on the berth deck, Landsman Lawson, upon regaining his composure, promptly returned to his station and, although urged to go below for treatment, steadfastly continued his duties throughout the remainder of the action.
	Henry W. Lawton	Army	Captain	Company A, 30th Indiana Infantry	Atlanta, Georgia	Aug 3, 1864	For extraordinary heroism on 3 August 1864, in action at Atlanta, Georgia. Captain Lawton led a charge of skirmishers against the enemy's rifle pits and stubbornly and successfully resisted two determined attacks of the enemy to retake the works
—	Nicholas Lear	Navy	Quartermaster	(United States Navy) USS New Ironsides	Aboard USS New Ironsides, First and Second Battles of Fort Fisher	Dec 1864 – Jan 1865	Lear served on board USS New Ironsides during action in several attacks on Fort Fisher, 24 and 25 December 1864; and 13, 14, and 15 January 1865.
—	James H. Lee	Navy	Seaman	(United States Navy) USS Kearsarge	Aboard USS Kearsarge off Cherbourg, France	June 19, 1864	For extraordinary heroism in action as Seaman on board the USS Kearsarge when she destroyed the Confederate raider Alabama off Cherbourg, France, 19 June 1864. Acting as sponger of the No. 1 gun during this engagement, Lee exhibited marked coolness and good conduct and was highly recommended for his gallantry under fire by the divisional officer.
—	George W. Leland	Navy	Gunner's Mate	(United States Navy) USS Lehigh	Aboard USS Lehigh	November 16, 1863	For extraordinary heroism in action while serving on board the USS Lehigh, Charleston Harbor, South Carolina, 16 November 1863, during the hazardous task, of freeing the Lehigh, which had grounded, and was under heavy enemy fire from Fort Moultrie. Rowing the small boat which was used in the hazardous task of transferring hawsers from the Lehigh to the Nahant, Gunner's Mate Leland twice succeeded in making the trip, only to find that each had been in vain when the hawsers were cut by enemy fire and chaffing.
—	Pierre Leon	Navy	Captain of the Forecastle	(United States Navy) USS Baron DeKalb	Aboard USS Baron DeKalb, Yazoo Pass Expedition	December 23, 1862 – December 27, 1862	For extraordinary heroism in action while serving on board USS Baron DeKalb, Yazoo River Expedition, 23 to 27 December 1862. Proceeding under orders up the Yazoo River, Baron De Kalb, with the object of capturing or destroying the enemy's transports, came upon the steamers John Walsh, R. J. Locklan, Golden Age and Scotland sunk on a bar where they were ordered fired. Continuing up the river, she was fired on, but upon returning the fire, caused the enemy's retreat. Returning down the Yazoo, she destroyed and captured larger quantities of enemy equipment and several prisoners. Serving bravely throughout this action, Leon, as captain of the forecastle, "distinguished himself in the various actions."
—	Edwin Leonard	Army	Sergeant	Company I, 37th Massachusetts Volunteer Infantry Regiment	near Petersburg, Virginia	Jun 18, 1864	For extraordinary heroism on 18 June 1864, in action at Petersburg, Virginia. Sergeant Leonard voluntarily exposed himself to the fire of a Union brigade to stop their firing on the Union skirmish line.
—	William E. Leonard	Army	Private	Company F, 85th Pennsylvania Volunteer Infantry Regiment	Deep Bottom, Virginia	Apr 16, 1864	For extraordinary heroism on 16 August 1864, in action at Deep Run, Virginia, for capture of battle flag.
—	Frank Leslie	Army	Private	(New York (state)) Company B, 4th Regiment New York Volunteer Cavalry	Front Royal, Virginia	Aug 15, 1864	For extraordinary heroism on 15 August 1864, in action at Front Royal, Virginia, for capture of colors of 3rd Virginia Infantry (C.S.A.).
	Benjamin Levy	Army	Private	(New York (state)) Company B, 1st New York Infantry	Battle of Glendale, Virginia	Jun 30, 1862	This soldier, a drummer boy, took the gun of a sick comrade, went into the fight, and when the color bearers were shot down, carried the colors and saved them from capture.
Medal of Honor	Dewitt Clinton Lewis	Army	Captain	Company F, 97th Pennsylvania Infantry	Battle of James Island, Secessionville, South Carolina	Jun 16, 1862	While retiring with his men before a heavy fire of canister shot at short range, returned in the face of the enemy's fire and rescued an exhausted private of his company who but for this timely action would have lost his life by drowning in the morass through which the troops were retiring.
—	Henry Lewis	Army	Corporal	Company B, 47th Ohio Infantry	Vicksburg, Mississippi	May 3, 1863	Was one of a party that volunteered and attempted to run the enemy's batteries with a steam tug and two barges loaded with subsistence stores.
—	Samuel E. Lewis	Army	Corporal	Company G, 1st Rhode Island Light Artillery	Third Battle of Petersburg, Virginia	Apr 2, 1865	Was one of a detachment of 20 picked artillerymen who voluntarily accompanied an infantry assaulting party and who turned upon the enemy the guns captured in the assault.
—	Adolphe Libaire	Army	Captain	(New York (state)) Company E, 9th New York Volunteer Infantry Regiment	Battle of Antietam, Maryland	Sep 17, 1862	In the advance on the enemy and after his color bearer and the entire color guard of eight men had been shot down, this officer seized the regimental flag and with conspicuous gallantry carried it to the extreme front, urging the line forward.
	John Lilley	Army	Private	Company F, 205th Pennsylvania Infantry	Third Battle of Petersburg, Virginia	Apr 2, 1865	After his regiment began to waiver he rushed on alone to capture the enemy flag. He reached the works and the Confederate color bearer who, at bayonet point, he caused to surrender with several enemy soldiers. He kept his prisoners in tow when they realized he was alone as his regiment in the meantime withdrew further to the rear.
medal of honor winner.	Henry F. W. Little	Army	Sergeant	Company D, 7th New Hampshire Volunteer Infantry Regiment	near Richmond, Virginia	Sep 1864	For extraordinary heroism in September 1864, in action at Richmond, Virginia, for gallantry on the skirmish line.
—	George H. Littlefield	Army	Corporal	Company G, 1st Maine Veteran Infantry	Fort Fisher, Virginia	Mar 25, 1865	For extraordinary heroism on 25 March 1865, in action at Fort Fisher, North Carolina. The color sergeant having been wounded, Corporal Littlefield picked up the flag and bore it to the front, to the great encouragement of the charging column.
Medal of Honor winner	Josiah O. Livingston	Army	First Lieutenant	9th Vermont Volunteer Infantry Regiment	Newport Barracks, North Carolina	Feb 2, 1864	When, after desperate resistance, the small garrison had been driven back to the river by a vastly superior force, this officer, while a small force held back the enemy, personally fired the railroad bridge, and, although wounded himself, assisted a wounded officer over the burning structure.
—	Benjamin Lloyd	Navy	Coal Heaver	(United States Navy) USS Wyalusing	Aboard USS Wyalusing	May 25, 1864	Serving on board USS Wyalusing and participating in a plan to destroy the rebel ram Albemarle in Roanoke River, 25 May 1864.
—	John W. Lloyd	Navy	Coxswain	(United States Navy) USS Wyalusing	Aboard USS Wyalusing	May 25, 1864	Serving on board USS Wyalusing during an attempt to destroy the rebel ram Albemarle in Roanoke River, 25 May 1864, Lloyd participated in this daring plan by swimming the Roanoke River heavily weighted with a line which was used for hauling torpedoes across. Thwarted by discovery just before the completion of the plan, Lloyd cut the torpedo guiding line to prevent detection of the plan by the enemy and again swam the river, narrowly escaping enemy musket fire and regaining the ship in safety.
Medal of Honor winner	Lewis Locke	Army	Private	Company A, 1st New Jersey Cavalry	Paines Crossroads, Virginia	Apr 5, 1865	For extraordinary heroism on 5 April 1865, in action at Paines Crossroads, Virginia, for capture of a Confederate flag.
—	Hugh Logan	Navy	Captain of the Afterguard	(United States Navy) USS Rhode Island	Aboard USS Rhode Island, loss of USS Monitor	December 30, 1862	On board USS Rhode Island which was engaged in rescuing men from the stricken USS Monitor in Mobile Bay, on 30 December 1862.
	John Lonergan	Army	Captain	Company A, 13th Vermont Infantry	Battle of Gettysburg, Pennsylvania	Jul 2, 1863	For extraordinary heroism on 2 July 1863, in action at Gettysburg, Pennsylvania, for gallantry in the recapture of four guns and the capture of two additional guns from the enemy; also the capture of a number of prisoners.
—	William H. Longshore	Army	Private	Company D, 30th Ohio Infantry	Battle of Vicksburg, Mississippi	May 22, 1863	For gallantry in the charge of the volunteer storming party on 22 May 1863, in action at Vicksburg, Mississippi.
	Joseph Lonsway	Army	Private	(New York (state)) Company D, 20th New York Cavalry	Murfrees Station, Virginia	Oct 16, 1864	For extraordinary heroism on 16 October 1864, in action at Murfrees Station, Virginia. Private Lonsway volunteered to swim Blackwater River to get a large flat used as a ferry on other side; succeeded in getting the boat safely across, making it possible for a detachment to cross the river and take possession of the enemy's breastworks.
Medal of Honor winner	William Lord	Army	Musician	Company C, 40th Massachusetts Volunteer Infantry Regiment	Drurys Bluff, Virginia	May 16, 1864	Went to the assistance of a wounded officer lying helpless between the lines, and under fire from both sides removed him to a place of safety.
medal of honor winner.	Andrew J. Lorish	Army	Commissary Sergeant	(New York (state)) 1st New York Dragoons	Battle of Opequon, Virginia	Sep 19, 1864	For extraordinary heroism on 19 September 1864, in action at Winchester, Virginia. Amid the enemy Commissary Sergeant Lorish grabbed the flag from a Color Bearer who then called for help. When the bearer's comrades were readying their rifles he dashed directly at them securing their disarming. As he rode away, the Confederates picked up their guns firing at the captor of their flag.
Medal of Honor winner	George M. Love	Army	Colonel	(New York (state)) 116th New York Volunteer Infantry	Battle of Cedar Creek, Virginia	Oct 19, 1864	For extraordinary heroism on 19 October 1864, in action at Cedar Creek, Virginia, for capture of battle flag of 2nd South Carolina (Confederate States of America).
Medal of Honor winner	George M. Lovering	Army	First Sergeant	Company I, 4th Massachusetts Infantry	Siege of Port Hudson, Louisiana	Jun 14, 1863	During a momentary confusion in the ranks caused by other troops rushing upon the regiment, this soldier, with coolness and determination, rendered efficient aid in preventing a panic among the troops.
Medal of Honor winner	Cyrus B. Lower	Army	Private	Company K, 13th Pennsylvania Reserve Regiment ("Bucktails")	Battle of the Wilderness, Virginia	May 7, 1864	Gallant services and soldierly qualities in voluntarily rejoining his command after having been wounded.
Medal of Honor winner	Robert A. Lower	Army	Private	Company K, 55th Illinois Volunteer Infantry	Battle of Vicksburg, Mississippi	May 22, 1863	For gallantry in the charge of the volunteer storming party on 22 May 1863, in action at Vicksburg, Mississippi.
—	George A. Loyd	Army	Private	Company A, 122nd Ohio Infantry	At Petersburg, Virginia	April 2, 1865	Capture of division flag of General Heth
—	George W. Lucas	Army	Private	Company C, 3rd Missouri Cavalry Regiment	Benton, Arkansas	Jul 25, 1864	Pursued and killed Confederate Brig. Gen. George M. Holt, Arkansas Militia, capturing his arms and horse.
Head and shoulders of a white man with a full beard and wire-framed glasses, wearing a suit coat, vest, and tie.	Moses A. Luce	Army	Sergeant	Company E, 4th Michigan Volunteer Infantry Regiment	Laurel Hill, Virginia	May 10, 1864	Voluntarily returned in the face of the advancing enemy to the assistance of a wounded and helpless comrade, and carried him, at imminent peril, to a place of safety.
Medal of Honor winner	William Ludgate	Army	Captain	(New York (state)) Company G, 59th New York Veteran Volunteer Infantry Regiment	Farmville, Virginia	Apr 7, 1865	Gallantry and promptness in rallying his men and advancing with a small detachment to save a bridge about to be fired by the enemy.
—	Carl Ludwig	Army	Private	(New York (state)) 34th Independent Battery New York Light Artillery	Second Battle of Petersburg, Virginia	Jun 18, 1864	As gunner of his piece, inflicted singly a great loss upon the enemy and distinguished himself in the removal of the piece while under a heavy fire.
Medal of Honor winner	Alphonso M. Lunt	Army	Sergeant	Company F, 38th Massachusetts Volunteer Infantry Regiment	Battle of Opequon, Virginia	Sep 19, 1864	Carried his flag to the most advanced position where, left almost alone close to the enemy's lines he refused their demand to surrender, withdrew at great personal peril, and saved his flag.
—	Franklin W. Lutes	Army	Corporal	(New York (state)) Company D, 111th New York Volunteer Infantry Regiment	Petersburg, Virginia	Mar 31, 1865	Capture of flag of 41st Alabama Infantry (C.S.A.), together with the color bearer and one of the color guard.
—	James H. Luther	Army	Private	Company D, 7th Regiment Massachusetts Volunteer Infantry	Second Battle of Fredericksburg, Virginia	May 3, 1863	Among the first to jump into the enemy's rifle pits, he himself captured and brought out three prisoners.
Medal of Honor winner	Gotlieb Luty	Army	Corporal	(New York (state)) Company A, 74th New York Volunteer Infantry Regiment	Battle of Chancellorsville, Virginia	May 3, 1863	For extraordinary heroism on 3 May 1863, in action at Chancellorsville, Virginia. Corporal Luty bravely advanced to the enemy's line under heavy fire and brought back valuable information.
	Joel H. Lyman	Army	Quartermaster Sergeant	(New York (state)) 9th New York Cavalry	Battle of Opequon, Virginia	Sep 19, 1864	For extraordinary heroism on 19 September 1864, in action at Winchester, Virginia. In an attempt to capture a Confederate flag, Quartermaster Sergeant Lyman captured one of the enemy's officers and brought him within the lines.
Medal of Honor winner	Frederick A. Lyon	Army	Corporal	Company A, 1st Vermont Volunteer Cavalry Regiment	Battle of Cedar Creek, Virginia	Oct 19, 1864	For extraordinary heroism on 19 October 1864, in action at Cedar Creek, Virginia. With one companion, Corporal Lyon captured the flag of a Confederate regiment, three officers, and an ambulance with its mules and driver.
—	Thomas Lyons	Navy	Seaman	(United States Navy) USS Pensacola	Aboard USS Pensacola, Battle of Forts Jackson and St. Philip	Apr 24, 1862	For extraordinary heroism in action, serving as Seaman on board the USS Pensacola in the attack on Forts Jackson and St. Philip, Louisiana, 24 April 1862. Carrying out his duties throughout the din and roar of the battle, Seaman Lyons never once erred in his brave performance. Lashed outside of that vessel, on the port-sheet chain, with the lead in hand to lead the ship past the forts, Lyons never flinched, although under a heavy fire from the forts and rebel gunboats.
