= Nathan E. Hickok =

- Born: c. 1839; Danbury, Connecticut, US
- Died: Date of death unknown
- Burial place: Danbury, Connecticut, US
- Military career
- Allegiance: United States of America
- Branch: United States Army
- Rank: Corporal
- Units: Company A, 8th Connecticut Volunteer Infantry Regiment
- Conflicts: American Civil War: Battle of Chaffin's Farm
- Awards: Medal of Honor

Nathan E. Hickok (born c. 1839; date of death unknown) was an American soldier who fought in the American Civil War. Hickok received the United States' highest award for bravery during combat, the Medal of Honor. Hickok's medal was won for his actions at the Battle of Chaffin's Farm, on September 29, 1864. He was honored with the award on April 6, 1865.

Hickok was born in Danbury, Connecticut, where he entered service in the war and was buried.

== Medal of Honor citation ==
The President of the United States of America, in the name of Congress, takes pleasure in presenting the Medal of Honor to Corporal Nathan E. Hickok, United States Army, for extraordinary heroism on 29 September 1864, while serving with Company A, 8th Connecticut Infantry, in action at Chapin's Farm, Virginia, for capture of flag.

== See also ==
- List of American Civil War Medal of Honor recipients: G–L
