= Daniel C. Harrington =

- Born: c. 1849; Ireland
- Military career
- Allegiance: United States
- Branch: United States Navy
- Rank: Landsman
- Unit: USS Pocahontas
- Conflicts: American Civil War
- Awards: Medal of Honor

Daniel C. Harrington (born c. 1849; date of death unknown) was a Union Navy sailor in the American Civil War who received the U.S. military's highest decoration, the Medal of Honor.

Harrington was born in Ireland, and emigrated to the United States, registering for the Navy in Massachusetts. Harrington as awarded the Medal of Honor for while serving on the USS Pocahontas in Harrington took part in a mission to find meat for his ship's crew near Brunswick, Georgia, and in returning to the beach was fired upon. Several of his comrades were killed or wounded and Harrington helped the casualties.

His Medal of Honor was issued on April 3, 1863.

It is not known when Harrington died or where he is buried.

== Medal of Honor citation ==
Harrington, a landsman from the U.S.S. Pocahontas, participated in a shore mission to procure meat for the ship's crew. While returning to the beach, the party was fired on from ambush and several men killed or wounded. Cool and courageous throughout his action, Harrington rendered gallant service against the enemy and in administering to the casualties.

== See also ==
- List of American Civil War Medal of Honor recipients: G–L
