= William Hinnegan =

- Born: June 26, 1841; Ireland
- Died: April 18, 1912 (aged 70)
- Military career
- Allegiance: United States; Union
- Branch: United States Navy; Union Navy
- Rank: Second Class Fireman
- Unit: (United States Navy) USS Agawam
- Conflicts: American Civil War
- Awards: Medal of Honor

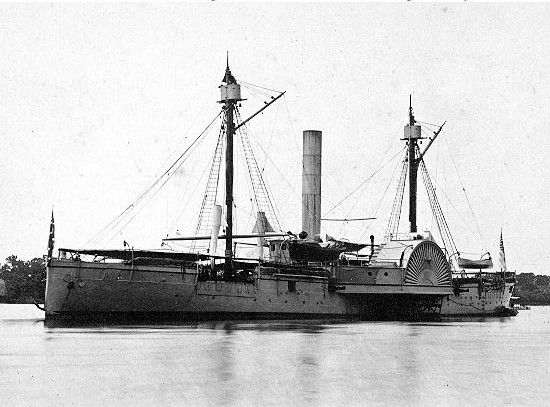
Hinnegan served on the USS Agawam, pictured in the James River, Virginia, July 1864

William Hinnegan (June 26, 1841 – April 18, 1912) was a sailor in the United States Navy during the American Civil War. He received the Medal of Honor.

== Biography ==
Hinnegan was born in 1841 in Ireland. He emigrated to the United States as a boy and joined the US Navy from New York City.

Hinnegan was a Fireman Second Class served on board the U.S.S. Agawam, as one of a volunteer crew of powder boat which was exploded near Fort Fisher, 23 December 1864. This act earned the Medal of Honor during the Civil War.

== Medal of Honor citation ==
Rank and organization: Fireman Second Class, U.S.S. Agawam. Place and date: At Fort Fisher, North Carolina, 23 December 1864

Citation:

The President of the United States of America, in the name of Congress, takes pleasure in presenting the Medal of Honor to Fireman Second Class William Hinnegan, United States Navy, for extraordinary heroism in action while serving on board the U.S.S. Agawam, as one of a volunteer crew of powder boat which was exploded near Fort Fisher, North Carolina, 23 December 1864. The powder boat, towed in by the Wilderness to prevent detection by the enemy, cast off and slowly steamed to within 300 yards of the beach. After fuses and fires had been lit and a second anchor with short scope let go to assure the boat's tailing inshore, the crew again boarded the Wilderness and proceeded a distance of 12 miles from shore. Less than two hours later the explosion took place, and the following day fires were observed still burning at the forts.

== See also ==
- List of Medal of Honor recipients
- List of American Civil War Medal of Honor recipients: G–L
