= Joseph Hedges (Medal of Honor) =

United States Union Army soldier

Joseph Snively Hedges
- Born: June 12, 1836; Mansfield, Ohio
- Died: August 12, 1910 (aged 74)
- Burial place: Mansfield, Ohio
- Military career
- Allegiance: United States of America
- Branch: United States Army
- Rank: First Lieutenant
- Unit: (United States) 4th U.S. Cavalry
- Conflicts: American Civil War
- Awards: Medal of Honor

Joseph Snively Hedges (1836 – 1910) was a Union Army soldier during the American Civil War. He received the Medal of Honor for gallantry as a First Lieutenant in the 4th U.S. Cavalry for action on December 17, 1864 near Harpeth River, Tennessee.

== Medal of Honor citation ==
“At the head of his regiment charged a field battery with strong infantry supports, broke the enemy's line, and, with other mounted troops, captured three guns and many prisoners.”

== See also ==
- 4th U.S. Cavalry
- List of American Civil War Medal of Honor recipients: G-L
