= Edward J. Houghton =

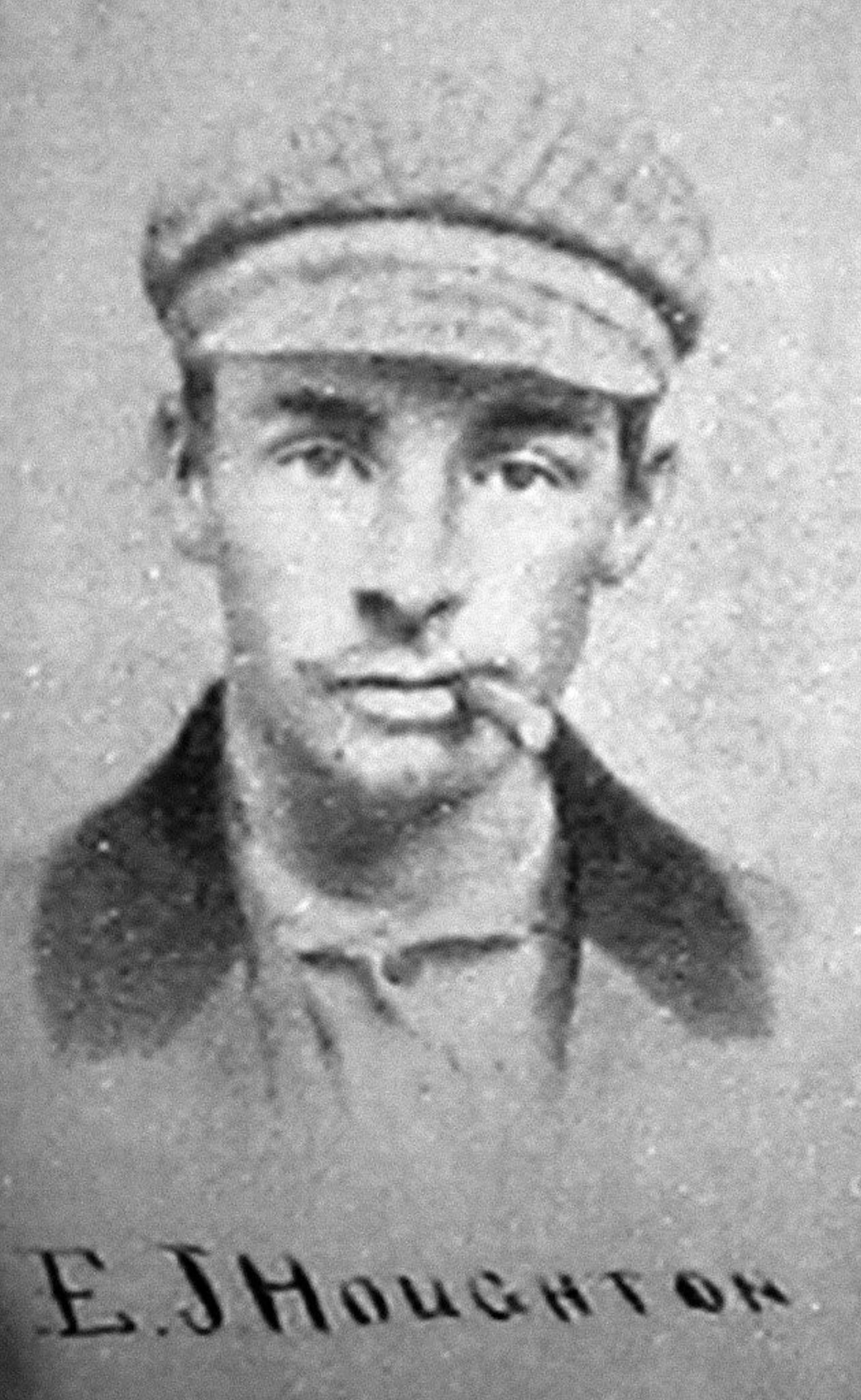
- Born: 1843; Mobile, Alabama, U.S.
- Died: July 16, 1865 (aged 21–22); Norfolk, Virginia, U.S.
- Honours: Medal of Honor

Edward J. Houghton (1843 – July 16, 1865) was an American sailor who received a Medal of Honor for his actions in the American Civil War whilst serving in the U.S. Navy.

== Biography ==
Houghton was born in Mobile, Alabama in 1843. He served as an ordinary seaman in the U.S. Navy during the Civil War. He earned his Medal of Honor on October 27, 1864, whilst serving aboard U.S. Picket Boat No.1. Houghton died in Norfolk, Virginia on July 16, 1865, and is now buried in Holyhood Cemetery, Brookline, Massachusetts.

== Medal of Honor Citation ==
Houghton served on board the U.S. Picket Boat No. 1 in action, 27 October 1864, against the Confederate ram Albemarle, which had resisted repeated attacks by our steamers and had kept a large force of vessels employed in watching her.
