= Solomon J. Hottenstein =

American soldier (1844–1896)

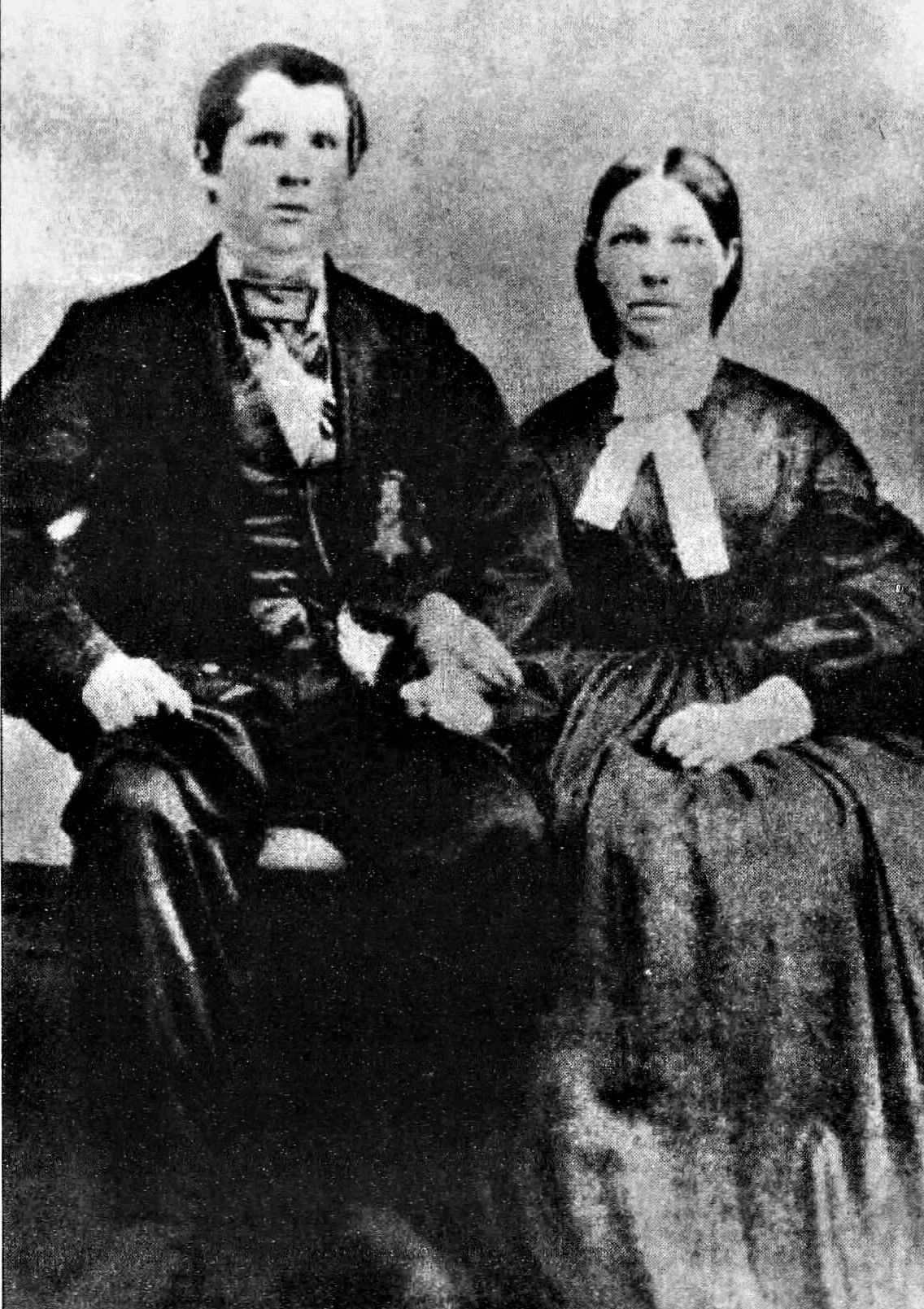
- Born: May 5, 1844; Lehigh County, Pennsylvania
- Died: May 24, 1896 (aged 52); Manassas, Virginia
- Burial place: Manassas Cemetery
- Spouse: Rebecca Clark
- Children: 7
- Military career
- Unit: 107th Pennsylvania Infantry
- Conflicts: American Civil War
- Awards: Medal of Honor

Solomon Joseph Hottenstein (May 5, 1844 – May 24, 1896) was an American soldier and member of the 107th Pennsylvania Infantry who fought in the American Civil War and was awarded the Medal of Honor for seizing the flag that belonged to a group of Confederate Army soldiers. Confederate soldiers subsequently pursued Hottenstein and were captured by Union Army soldiers.

Hottenstein was born in Lehigh County, Pennsylvania and died in Manassas, Virginia, where he was interred in Manassas Cemetery. He had seven children.
