= William P. Johnston =

American sailor and recipient of the Medal of Honor

William P. Johnston (July 5, 1849 – May 8, 1888) was an American sailor and recipient of the Medal of Honor who received the medal for his actions in the American Civil War.

== Biography ==
Johnston was born in Chicago, Illinois on July 5, 1849. Johnston served as a Landsman aboard the USS Fort Hindman during the American Civil War. He earned his medal in action at aboard the USS Fort Hindman, near Harrisonburg, Louisiana on March 2, 1864. He died in La Porte, Indiana on May 8, 1888, and his now buried in Patton Cemetery, La Porte, Indiana.

== Medal of Honor citation ==
For extraordinary heroism on board the USS Fort Hindman during the engagement near Harrisonburg, La., 2 March 1864. Badly wounded in the hand during the action, Johnston, despite his wound, took the place of another man to sponge and lead one of the guns throughout the entire action in which the Fort Hindman was raked severely with shot and shell from the enemy guns.
