= James H. Luther =

American Civil War soldier

- Born: January 24, 1841; Dighton, Massachusetts
- Died: March 3, 1916 (aged 75)
- Burial place: Taunton, Massachusetts
- Military career
- Allegiance: United States of America; Union
- Branch: United States Army; Union Army
- Service years: 1861 - 1864
- Rank: Corporal
- Units: Company D, 7th Regiment Massachusetts Volunteer Infantry
- Conflicts: American Civil War
- Awards: Medal of Honor

James H. Luther (January 24, 1841 – March 3, 1916) was a private in the Union Army and a Medal of Honor recipient for his actions in the American Civil War.

Luther joined the Army in June 1861, and mustered out with his regiment three years later.

== Medal of Honor citation ==
Rank and organization: Private, Company D, 7th Massachusetts Infantry. Place and date: At Fredericksburg, Va., May 3, 1863. Entered service at: ------. Birth: Dighton, Mass. Date of issue: June 28, 1890.

Citation:

Among the first to jump into the enemy's rifle pits, he himself captured and brought out three prisoners.

== See also ==
- List of Medal of Honor recipients
- List of American Civil War Medal of Honor recipients: A–F
