= Stephen Decatur Trenchard =

United States Navy admiral (1818–1883)

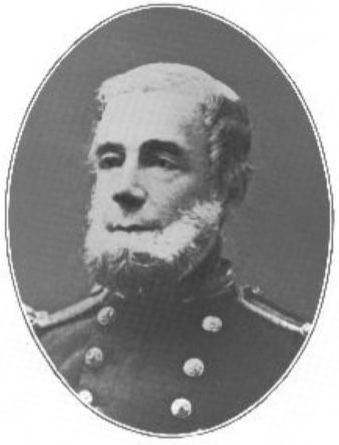
- Born: July 10, 1818; Brooklyn, New York
- Died: November 15, 1883 (aged 65); New York City
- Burial place: Church of St. James the Less, Philadelphia
- Relatives: Edward Trenchard (father)
- Military career
- Allegiance: United States of America
- Branch: United States Navy
- Service years: 1834–1880
- Rank: Rear admiral
- Commands: Vixen; Keystone State; Rhode Island; Lancaster; Hartford
- Conflicts: Second Seminole War; Mexican-American War; Second Opium War; American Civil War

Stephen Decatur Trenchard (July 10, 1818 – November 15, 1883) was a rear admiral in the United States Navy. He was present at the Battle of Taku Forts in 1859, and commanded the supply ship and gunboat Rhode Island throughout the American Civil War, seeing action at both Battles of Fort Fisher. He later commanded the North Atlantic Squadron.

== Biography ==
=== Early life and background ===
Trenchard was born in Brooklyn, New York, the son of U.S. Navy Captain Edward Trenchard and Eliza Sands Trenchard, the daughter of merchant and politician Joshua Sands. He was named for the distinguished naval officer Stephen Decatur, a close friend of his father, and was a direct descendant of George Trenchard (1655–1712), from the village of Wolverton in Dorset, who had come to the United States with William Penn in 1682. Stephen's great-grandfather, also George, (1706–1780), was the Attorney-General of West New Jersey in 1767-75 and commanded the Salem Light Horse during the Revolutionary War.

=== Early service ===
Trenchard attended a school at Gambier, Ohio, founded by Bishop Philander Chase, with the intention of preparing for the ministry, but instead decided to follow the example of his father and uncle Joshua R. Sands, and join the Navy. After a probationary cruise in the Mediterranean aboard the frigate Constitution, he received his warrant as midshipman on October 23, 1834, and was ordered to the receiving ship Concord, at Portsmouth. During the Second Seminole War Trenchard cruised in the West Indies, and on the coast of Florida, and had a tour of duty in the Mediterranean Sea aboard the sloop Levant under the command of Hiram Paulding.

Promoted to passed midshipman on July 16, 1840, he attended the Philadelphia Naval School, then returned to the Mediterranean in 1841 to serve aboard the sloops Preble and Fairfield.

During the winter of 1845–46 he was aboard the schooner Gallatin engaged in surveying the coast of Georgia and Florida, and received his commission as lieutenant on February 27, 1847. He served aboard the sloop Albany in the Home Squadron in 1850–52, and in the receiving ship Philadelphia in 1853.

Trenchard served in the United States Coast Survey from 1854 to 1857. During the summer of 1856 he was in command of the U.S. Coast Survey ship Vixen, surveying the New England coast. On August 14, while off Cape Ann, Trenchard rescued the crew of the British bark Adieu, which had struck a reef and was breaking up. He received a sword from the British Government as a mark of gratitude, and although it was against the laws of the United States (Article I, Section 9, of the U.S. Constitution) for its officers to accept awards from a foreign state, Congress passed a special act permitting him to receive it.

=== Voyage of the Powhatan ===
In 1857 Trenchard was appointed executive officer of the sidewheel steam frigate Powhatan, under the command of Captain George F. Pearson, for an extended cruise to the Far East as part of the East India Squadron. The ship left Norfolk, Virginia, on December 7, 1857, but a series of mechanical breakdowns meant that she did not get to sea until the 11th, proceeding to Madeira with the former President Franklin Pierce, his wife Jane, and their suite as passengers. The Powhatan made the run across the Atlantic without any further difficulties, reaching Funchal on the 27th, where the ex-President and his family went ashore.

The frigate departed Funchal on January 6, 1858, calling at Jamestown, Saint Helena, where Trenchard visited Longwood House, the scene of Napoleon's captivity and death. On leaving Jamestown harbor Powhatan collided with the Dutch bark Stad Enchede, sustaining minor damage. She towed the bark back to port and made repairs, leaving Saint Helena again the next day. Powhatan then shaped her course for China, calling at Cape Town, Port Louis, Acheen, and Singapore, arriving at Hong Kong on May 12, where the steamer San Jacinto was flying the broad pennant of Commodore Josiah Tattnall III, who transferred his flag to the Powhatan to visit various ports in China and Japan.

Trenchard was aboard the Powhatan at the during the Battle of Taku Forts in June 1859, when Commodore Tattnall, observing the desperate position of the British and French forces attempting to force their way up the Hai River, exclaimed "Blood is thicker than water!" and went to their assistance despite the United States's neutrality in the conflict. Soon after, when the United States concluded a treaty with China, Trenchard was part of Ambassador John Elliot Ward's retinue that traveled to Beijing where treaties were formally exchanged. Powhatan then returned to the United States.

=== Civil War ===
On April 19, 1861, shortly after the start of the Civil War, Trenchard was given command of the gunboat Keystone State at Philadelphia. From there he sailed to Norfolk Navy Yard, arriving there to find it in flames, as Union forces destroyed everything before the Confederates could capture it. Confederate forces had already sunk several vessels to block the channel, and the frigate Cumberland was in great danger, but Keystone State succeeded in towing her to safety. Flag Officer Hiram Paulding then transferred his flag to the Keystone State and proceeded to Washington.

==== Supply ship commander ====
On June 19, 1861, Trenchard was given command of the supply ship Rhode Island, formerly the Eagle, a 236-foot side-wheel steamer built for the Charleston Line. Eight 8-inch (200 mm) guns were installed, while her bows were heavily plated with iron. An ice-house and other fittings were also added to her at the Brooklyn Navy Yard.

Between July 1861 and November 1862 Rhode Island made nine voyages, operating between either New York or Philadelphia and the Gulf of Mexico, carrying supplies of food, guns, powder and ammunition to ships on blockade, and transporting officers to their ships, and prisoners or sick or injured men to shore. She also captured the Confederate schooner Venus, laden with lead, copper, tin, and wool, in December 1861.

Trenchard was promoted to commander on July 16, 1862.

With the capture of New Orleans, Pensacola, Port Royal, Fernandina, and other southern ports by the Union in 1861–62, it became easier for the blockading squadrons to obtain fresh supplies, and only one steamer was considered necessary to maintain the service. The Rhode Island was therefore refitted in Boston as a gunboat, and rearmed with eight 8-inch broadside guns, a 3-pounder Parrott gun, a rifled 12-pounder Dahlgren gun, and an 8-inch Dahlgren aft. Her complement also was increased.

==== Gunboat commander ====
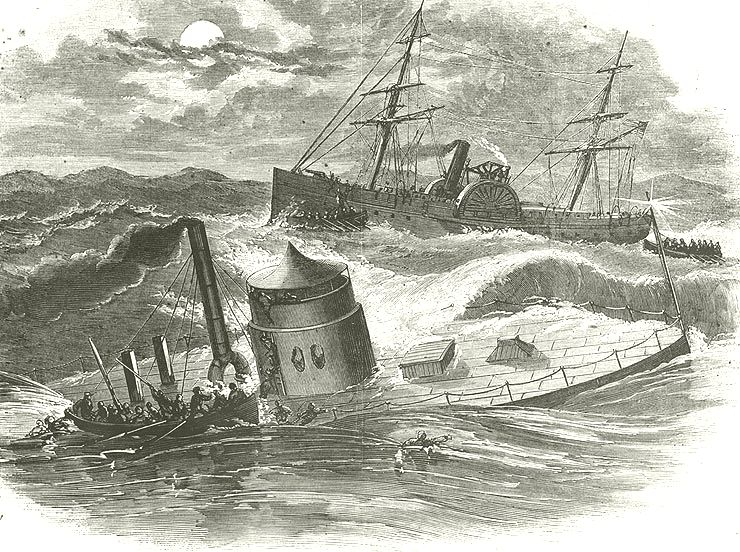
Rhode Island rescues the crew of the Monitor on December 30–31, 1862. Line engraving published in Harper's Weekly, 1863.

Rhode Island left Boston on December 5, 1862, on her maiden cruise as a gunboat. Trenchard's first important duty was to tow the ironclad Monitor from Hampton Roads to Port Royal. Unfortunately, during the night the weather deteriorated, and the Monitor broached and sank. Trenchard sent his ships boats and saved most of the crew. On January 12, 1863, Rhode Island left Hampton Roads with the monitor Passaic in tow for Port Royal, arriving safely.

Trenchard was then ordered to join the search for the Confederate cruisers Florida and Alabama. Trenchard pursued several suspicious vessels between Hampton Roads and Havana, then in company with Santiago de Cuba patrolled the Bahama Banks. Trenchard captured the Cronstadt, a blockade-runner from Wilmington bound for Nassau, Bahamas, with a cargo of cotton, tobacco, and turpentine on August 16. From November 1863 until March 1864, the Rhode Island was engaged in escorting mail-steamers in the West Indies. Finally ordered home, during her cruise she had boarded more than fifty vessels.

In October 1864 Trenchard was ordered to tow the new monitor Monadnock from Boston Navy Yard to Norfolk, Virginia, accompanied by the Massasoit and the Little Addie. Another serious loss was averted after the tow-line parted in a gale and the ships ran for shelter in Holmes's Hole, before making Brooklyn Navy Yard. Rhode Island was then detached to sail to Aspinwall, Columbia, to escort the valuable mail-steamer Costa Rica from there back to New York. Rhode Island then remained at New York anchored in the East River opposite Wall Street, having her guns trained so as to protect Government properties from the threat of mob violence.

On November 22, 1864, Rhode Island departed New York, and a few days later, in company with Mackinaw, captured the British blockade-runner Vixen. On December 24 Rhode Island took part in the failed attack on Fort Fisher, returning the next day to embark troops from the shore. Rhode Island resumed blockade duty, and prepared for the second attack which was a success. On the first day, January 13, 1865, Rhode Island was heavily engaged with Confederate batteries, and landed artillery for the army on the 14th and 15th, when the fort fell. In March Trenchard was ordered to take Rhode Island to Belfast, Maine, in order to recruit men for the Navy, and was there when the war ended in April 1865.

=== Post-war career ===
In June 1865 Trenchard was appointed senior officer of the convoy service fleet, based at Cap-Haïtien, and was promoted to the rank of captain in July, then served as executive officer of the Brooklyn Navy Yard in 1866–69. On September 9, 1865, he fell overboard while attempting to assist a ferryboat which had collided with another vessel. One of his men, Seaman John Taylor, rescued him from the water, for which Taylor was later awarded the Medal of Honor.

Trenchard commanded the screw sloop Lancaster, flagship of the South Atlantic Squadron, in 1869–71, then, with the rank of commodore, served for three years as an Inspector of the Third Lighthouse District.

On August 10, 1875, Trenchard attained the rank of rear admiral and commanded the North Atlantic Squadron, with the Hartford as his flagship. In 1876, during the controversy over the Hayes-Tilden presidential election Trenchard was in command of a Naval Brigade that was stationed in Washington D.C., to preserve order. Fortunately the anticipated riots did not occur. After serving on a special board in Washington, he retired on July 10, 1880.

In 1879–80 Trenchard was the senior vice-commander of the New York Commandery of the Loyal Legion. He died in New York City, on November 15, 1883. and is buried in the churchyard of Church of St. James the Less in Philadelphia.

== Personal life ==
Trenchard married Anne O'Connor Barclay, the daughter of Captain John Mortimer Barclay, U.S. Army, in December 1848. They had one child, a son named Edward Trenchard (1850–1922), who was a noted marine artist.

Military offices
Preceded by William E. Le Roy	Commander-in-Chief, North Atlantic Squadron; September 1876–September 1878	Succeeded by John C. Howell
