= Hugh Logan =

- Civil War era Navy Medal of Honor
- Born: November 23, 1834; Lanark, Scotland
- Died: November 22, 1903 (aged 68–69); Glasgow, Scotland
- Burial place: Lanark, South Lanarkshire, Scotland
- Military career
- Allegiance: United States of America; Union
- Branch: United States Navy; Union Navy
- Service years: 1862 - 1863
- Rank: Captain of the Afterguard
- Unit: (United States Navy) USS Rhode Island (1860)
- Conflicts: American Civil War
- Awards: Medal of Honor

Hugh Logan (November 23, 1834 – November 22 1903) was a Captain of the Afterguard in the Union Navy and a Medal of Honor recipient for his actions in the American Civil War.

Logan joined the Navy from Boston in November 1862, and was discharged in December 1863.

== Medal of Honor citation ==
Rank and organization: Captain of the Afterguard, U.S. Navy. Born: 1834, Scotland. Accredited to: Massachusetts. G.O. No.: 59, June 22, 1865.

Citation:

On board the U.S.S. Rhode Island which was engaged in saving the lives of the officers and crew of the Monitor, 30 December 1862. Participating in the hazardous rescue of the officers and crew of the sinking Monitor, Logan, after rescuing several of the men, became separated in a heavy gale with other members of the cutter that had set out from the Rhode Island, and spent many hours in the small boat at the mercy of the weather and high seas until finally picked up by a schooner 50 miles east of Cape Hatteras.

== See also ==
- List of American Civil War Medal of Honor recipients: A–F
- Monitor warships
