= William B. Stacy =

United States Navy sailor (1838-1921)

William Bradford Stacy
- Born: March 4, 1838; Fall River, Massachusetts, U.S.
- Died: May 3, 1921 (aged 83); Haswell, Colorado, U.S.
- Military career
- Allegiance: United States
- Branch: United States Navy
- Rank: Seaman
- Unit: USS Rhode Island
- Awards: Medal of Honor

William Bradford Stacy (March 4, 1838 – May 3, 1921) was a United States Navy sailor and a recipient of the United States military's highest decoration, the Medal of Honor.

== Biography ==
A native of Massachusetts, Stacy joined the Navy from that state and by January 15, 1866, was serving as a seaman on the USS Rhode Island. On that day, while the Rhode Island was being resupplied in the harbor of Cap-Haïtien, Haiti, one of the crewman fell overboard. The sailor was able to grab onto a rope but, due to a strong current, eventually lost his strength and let go. Stacy then jumped into the water and rescued the man by tying the rope around his waist. For this action, he was awarded the Medal of Honor.

Stacy's official Medal of Honor citation reads:

While coaling ship in the harbor of Cape Haiten, one of the crew of the Rhode Island fell overboard, and, after catching a rope, had been forced by exhaustion, to relinquish his hold. Although the sea was running high at the time, Stacy, at the peril of his life, jumped overboard, secured the rope around his shipmate, and thus saved him from drowning.

== See also ==
- List of Medal of Honor recipients during peacetime
