= John Taylor (Medal of Honor) =

- Navy Medal of Honor
- Military career
- Allegiance: United States
- Branch: United States Navy
- Rank: Seaman
- Awards: Medal of Honor

John Taylor (fl. 1865) was a United States Navy sailor and a recipient of the U.S. military's highest decoration, the Medal of Honor.

== Biography ==
Taylor served in the U.S. Navy as a seaman stationed at the Brooklyn Navy Yard in New York. On September 9, 1865, he was in charge of the Navy Yard's picket boat as it patrolled the East River with the yard's executive officer, Commander Stephen Decatur Trenchard, on board. When a ferry boat and an English steamer collided, Trenchard ordered Taylor to pull their boat alongside the stricken ferry to render assistance. As Trenchard attempted to step onto the ferry, he lost his footing and fell into the water. Taylor then showed "rare coolness and judgment" as he rescued the officer. For this action, he was awarded the Medal of Honor four months later, on January 15, 1866.

Taylor's official Medal of Honor citation reads:

Seaman in charge of the picket boat attached to the Navy Yard, New York, 9 September 1865. Acting with promptness, coolness and good judgment, Taylor rescued from drowning Commander S. D. Trenchard, of the U.S. Navy, who fell overboard in attempting to get on a ferryboat, which had collided with an English steamer, and needed immediate assistance.

== See also ==
- List of Medal of Honor recipients during peacetime
