= George Moore (Medal of Honor) =

- Civil War era Navy Medal of Honor
- Born: c. 1837; Philadelphia, Pennsylvania
- Died: July 24, 1904 (aged 66–67); Trenton, New Jersey
- Burial place: Saint John’s Cemetery, Trenton, New Jersey
- Military career
- Allegiance: United States of America; Union
- Branch: United States Navy; Union Navy
- Service years: 1862 - 1865
- Rank: Seaman
- Unit: (United States Navy) USS Rhode Island
- Conflicts: Civil War
- Awards: Medal of Honor

Seaman George Moore (born George Joseph Moore, c. 1837 – d. July 24, 1904) was a Union Navy sailor in the American Civil War and a recipient of the U.S. military's highest decoration, the Medal of Honor.

== Military service ==
Born in 1837 in Philadelphia, Moore enlisted in the Union Navy on November 26, 1862, at Boston. He served aboard the USS Rhode Island. On December 30, 1862, the USS Monitor, which was under tow by the USS Rhode Island foundered 10 miles east of Cape Hatteras in heavy seas. Moore, a crew member aboard the Rhode Island’s cutter boat, helped to rescue the crew members of the USS Monitor into the cutter, at the peril to his own life. Moore was awarded the Medal of Honor for this heroic action. George Moore re-enlisted in the Union Navy on January 23, 1864, serving till being discharged April 7, 1865.

== Medal of Honor citation ==
Rank and organization: Seaman, U.S. Navy. Accredited to: Pennsylvania. G.O. No.: 59, 22 June 1865.

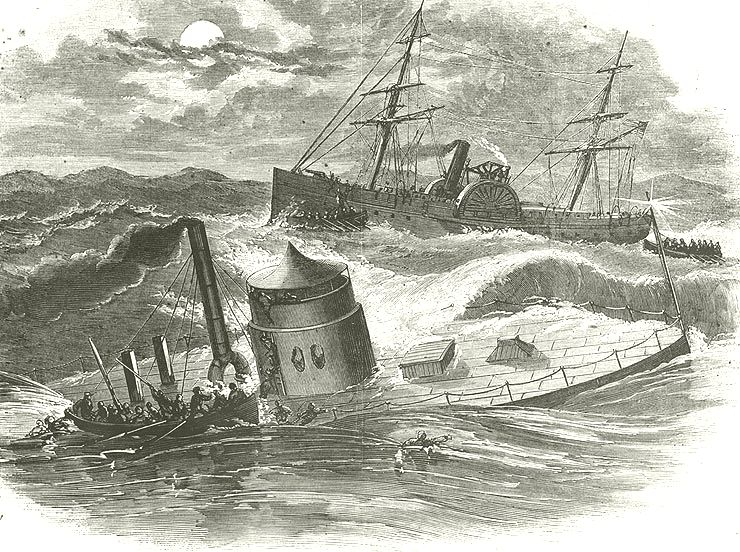
Engraving of the Monitor sinking

Moore's official Medal of Honor citation reads:

Served on board the U.S.S. Rhode Island which was engaged in saving the lives of the officers and crew of the Monitor, 30 December 1862. Participating in the hazardous task of rescuing the officers and crew of the sinking Monitor, Moore after rescuing several of the men, became separated in a heavy gale with other members of the cutter that had set out from the Rhode Island, and spent many hours in the small boat at the mercy of the weather and high seas until finally picked up by a schooner 50 miles east of Cape Hatteras.

== Death and burial ==
Moore died on July 24, 1904, in Trenton, New Jersey, of congestion of the lungs and was buried in Saint John's Cemetery in Trenton. The remains of George Moore, his widow Anna née Walters Moore and other Moore / Walters family members are interred in Burial plot: Section A, lot 321.

Moore's death notice in the July 25, 1904, Trenton Evening Times newspaper read:

George J. Moore - George J. Moore died at his residence, 238 Elmer street, last evening, after an illness of three days. He was about 45 years old. The widow and one son, George, survive. The arrangements for the funeral, in charge of Tilton, have not been completed.

Moore's funeral notice in the July 28, 1904, Trenton Evening Times newspaper read:

George Moore – George Moore was buried this morning in St. John’s cemetery. The funeral took place from his late residence, 238 Elmer street, with requiem high mass at Sacred Heart Church.
