= USS Rhode Island (1860) =

Gunboat of the United States Navy

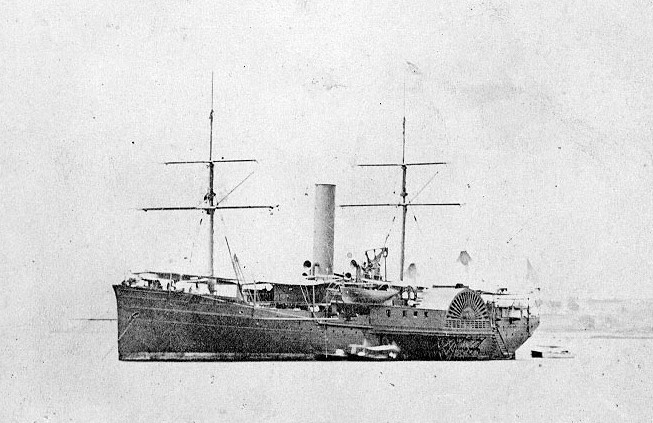
- USS Rhode Island anchored off Newport, Rhode Island, in 1866

History

United States
- Name: John P. King (yard name); Eagle (yard name); USS Rhode Island (1861); Charleston (1867)
- Builder: J. A. Westervelt & Sons (Manhattan, NY)
- Laid down: 1860
- Launched: 6 Sep 1860
- Acquired: by purchase, 27 Jun 1861
- Commissioned: 29 Jul 1861 – 21 Apr 1864; 3 Oct 1864 – 1867
- Fate: Sold for merchant service, 1 Oct 1867; abandoned, 1885

General characteristics
- Type: Steamer
- Tonnage: 1517 tons burthen
- Length: 236 ft 2 in (71.98 m)
- Beam: 36 ft 8 in (11.18 m)
- Draft: 15 ft (4.6 m)
- Propulsion: Steam engine
- Speed: 16 knots (30 km/h; 18 mph)
- Complement: 257 officers and enlisted
- Armament: As supply ship (1861–1864) : 4 × 32-pounder guns; As auxiliary cruiser (1864–1867) : 1 × 11 in (280 mm) gun; 8 × 8 in (200 mm) guns; 1 × 30-pounder Parrott rifle; 1 × 12-pounder rifle

USS Rhode Island was a fast sidewheel supply ship and later armed cruiser which served in the United States Navy during the American Civil War. She was the first ship of the Navy to bear the name.

Rhode Island was originally built in New York in 1860 as the merchant ship John P. King. After being severely damaged by fire just after completion, the steamer was rebuilt and renamed Eagle. Before entering service, Eagle was purchased by the Navy and commissioned as the supply ship USS Rhode Island. In this capacity, Rhode Island was towing the historic ironclad USS Monitor to New York in 1862 when the latter vessel sank in a gale off Cape Hatteras; six of Rhode Island's crew were awarded the Medal of Honor for their actions during the disaster.

Refitted as a cruiser in 1864, Rhode Island continued to serve through the war and after. In 1866, another member of her crew received the Medal of Honor for the rescue of a shipmate.

Sold in 1867, the ship returned to merchant service the same year as Charleston until 1885, when she was abandoned by her owners.

== Construction and commission ==
John P. King, a wooden-hulled, sidewheel passenger-and-freight steamship, was built in Manhattan, New York, in 1860 by J. A. Westervelt & Sons. Shortly after her initial trial trip, she was seriously damaged by a fire that broke out in the engine room. She was rebuilt by the original contractors in 1861 and renamed Eagle. On 27 June 1861, prior to entering service, Eagle was purchased by the Navy from her owners, Spofford, Tileston & Company, for service in the recently declared civil war, and renamed Rhode Island.

Rhode Island was built of white and live oak with copper and iron fastenings. Her hull was reinforced with iron bracing. She was commissioned at New York Navy Yard on 29 July 1861, Commander Stephen D. Trenchard in command.

== Service history ==
=== Supply ship ===
During the American Civil War, Rhode Island was employed as a supply ship, visiting various ports and ships with mail, paymasters officers stores, medicine, and other supplies. She departed New York on her first cruise on 31 July 1861, returning on 2 September. While cruising off Galveston, Texas, Rhode Island captured the schooner Venus attempting to run the blockade with a cargo of lead, copper, tin, and wood. During the remainder of 1861 and 1862 Rhode Island continued her essential support duties. Departing Philadelphia on 5 February 1862, she supplied 98 vessels with various stores before returning to Hampton Roads, Virginia, on 18 March; on another trip from 5 April to 20 May 1862 she supplied 118 vessels. Assigned to support the Gulf Blockading Squadron from 17 April 1862, Rhode Island chased and forced ashore the British schooner Richard O'Bryan near San Luis Pass on 4 July 1862.

=== Loss of USS Monitor ===
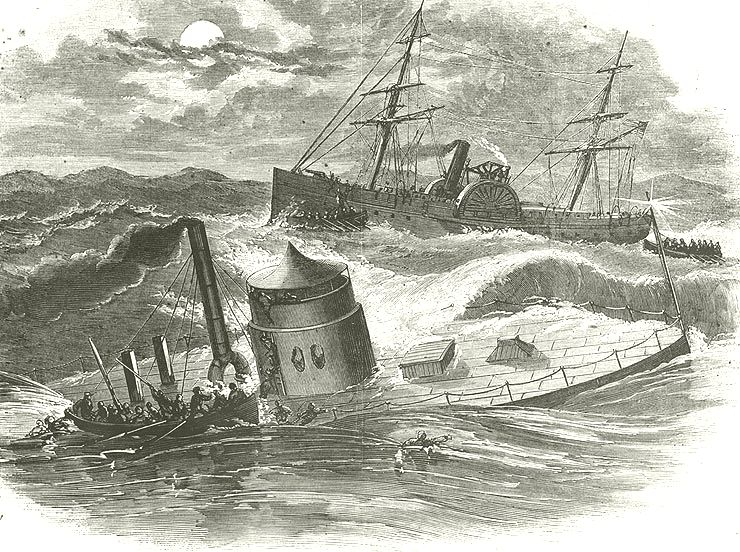
Engraving of Monitor sinking

Returning to the north, Rhode Island's next duties were towing the low-freeboard monitors USS Monitor, USS Passaic, USS Montauk, and USS Weehawken south from Hampton Roads to Beaufort, North Carolina, or Port Royal, South Carolina. On 29 December 1862 Rhode Island departed Hampton Roads with the famous Monitor in tow and Passaic in company. As the ships rounded Cape Hatteras on the evening of 30 December, they encountered a heavy storm. Monitor's pumps were unable to control flooding caused by underwater leaks so that the order to abandon ship had to be given. Before Monitor's crew could be completely transferred to Rhode Island, the ironclad sank, taking four officers and 12 enlisted men with her. Rhode Island endeavored to remain as near as possible to the position in which Monitor sank so as to fix the location, some 20 miles (32 km) south-southwest of Cape Hatteras and to await daylight to search for a missing small boat. Seven Rhode Island crewman were awarded the Medal of Honor for their actions during the sinking: Ordinary Seaman Luke M. Griswold, Seaman Lewis A. Horton, Landsman John Jones, Captain of the Afterguard Hugh Logan, Seaman George Moore, Coxswain Charles H. Smith, and Coxswain Maurice Wagg.

=== Enforcing the blockade ===
On 29 January 1863 Rhode Island was ordered to the West Indies to join in the search for the Confederate steamers Oreto and Alabama. Unable to help locate the Confederate warships, she did succeed in driving the blockade runner Margaret and Jessie ashore at Stirrup Cay on 30 May. Continuing her cruising on the Atlantic coast, Rhode Island achieved a fourth victory on 16 August when she captured the British blockade runner Cronstadt north of Man of War Bay, Abaco, Bahamas with a cargo of cotton, turpentine, and tobacco.

=== Conversion to cruiser ===
With defective boilers requiring repair, Rhode Island entered Boston Navy Yard on 28 March 1864 for overhaul and was decommissioned there on 21 April. Extensive alterations were made transforming Rhode Island into an auxiliary cruiser mounting one 11-inch gun, eight 8-inch (203 mm) guns, one 30-pounder (14 kg) Parrott rifle, and one 12-pounder (5 kg) rifle. Ordered to tow the monitor USS Monadnock from Boston to New York on 26 September 1864, Rhode Island recommissioned on 3 October 1864 and joined the North Atlantic Blockading Squadron soon afterward.

Employed in cruising along Confederate-controlled coasts Rhode Island's duty was highlighted by the capture of the British blockade runner Vixen on 1 December 1864. Sailing from Hampton Roads on 11 December with the monitor USS Canonicus in tow, Rhode Island joined the squadron attacking Fort Fisher, taking part in the first assault on 24 December and the second, successful attempt of 13–15 January 1865. Signal Quartermaster Charles H. Foy was awarded the Medal of Honor for his actions during the Second Battle of Fort Fisher.

Ordered to tow the monitor USS Saugus from Federal Point, North Carolina, to Norfolk, Virginia, on 16 January 1865, Rhode Island subsequently cruised in company with the seagoing monitor USS Dictator in March. In May Rhode Island made a cruise to Mobile, Alabama, returning to Hampton Roads on 22 May.

Maintained in commission in the years immediately following the end of the Civil War, Rhode Island's first duty was to help bring the formidable former Confederate armored ram Stonewall to the United States. Departing on 21 October for Havana in company with USS Hornet, Rhode Island returned with the French-built Stonewall on 23 November.

=== After the Civil War ===
Throughout 1866, Rhode Island continued to cruise in the Atlantic and West Indies, from April 1866 flying the flag of Rear Admiral James S. Palmer. On 15 January 1866, Seaman William B. Stacy was awarded the Medal of Honor for rescuing a drowning crewmate while the ship was in the harbor of Cap-Haïtien, Haiti. Calling once at Halifax in 1867 before being decommissioned, Rhode Island was sold to G. W. Quintard on 1 October 1867. Redocumented as Charleston on 8 November 1867, the side-wheeler remained in merchant service until abandoned in 1885.

== See also ==
- Confederate States Navy
- Union Navy
- Union Blockade
