= James Trenchard =

American artist, printmaker, and engraver

- Born: 1747; Penns Neck, Salem County, New Jersey
- Died: Unknown
- Notable work: Columbian Magazine; Depiction of the Great Seal of the United States

James Trenchard (1747–?) was an American artist, printmaker, and engraver. He was born in Penns Neck, Salem County, New Jersey and by 1777 had moved to Philadelphia to work as an engraver. He was an illustrator for the Columbian Magazine and was its publisher from 1789 to 1790. In 1793 he emigrated to England.

== Gallery ==
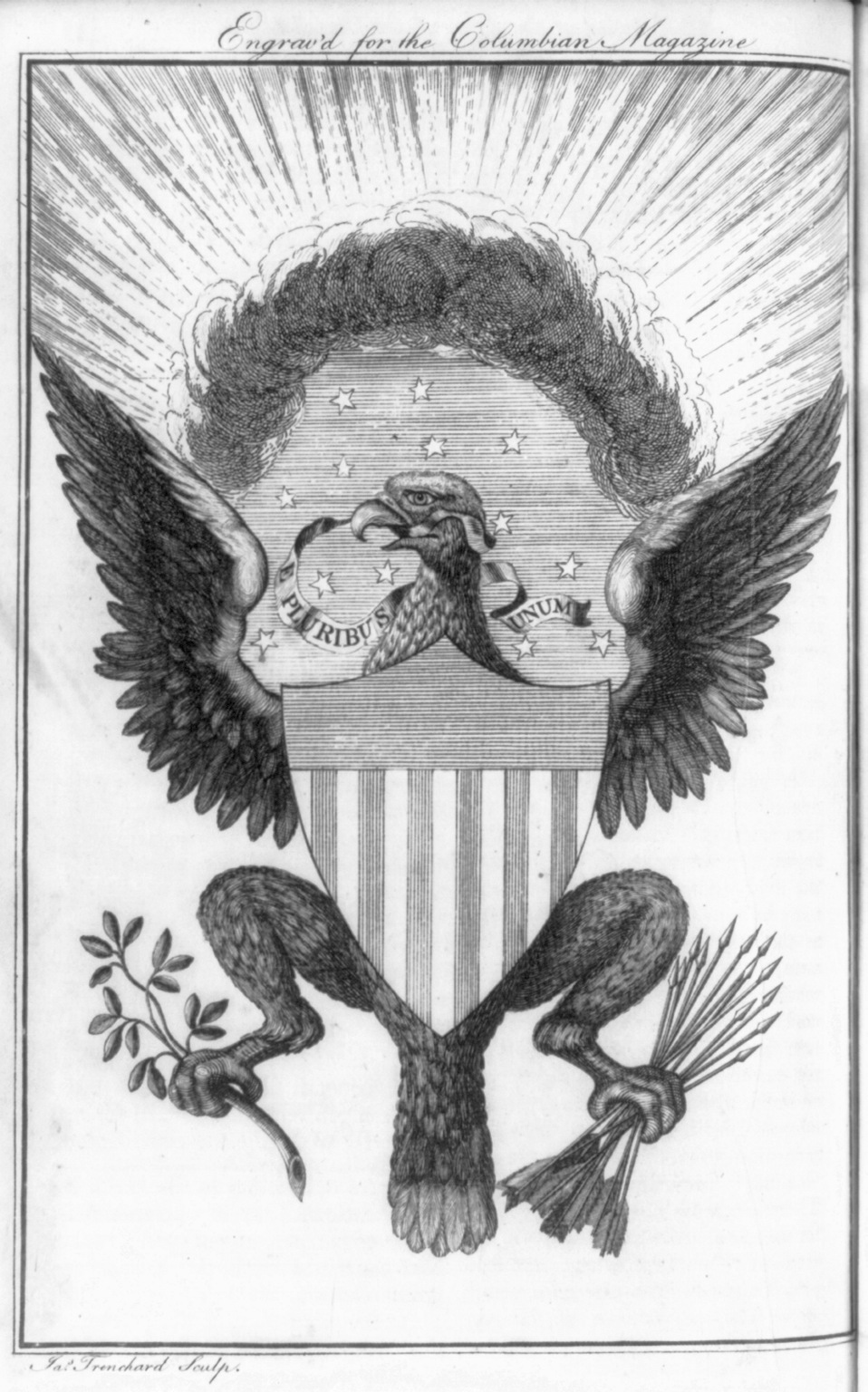
Depiction of the Great Seal of the United States, by James Trenchard, 1786

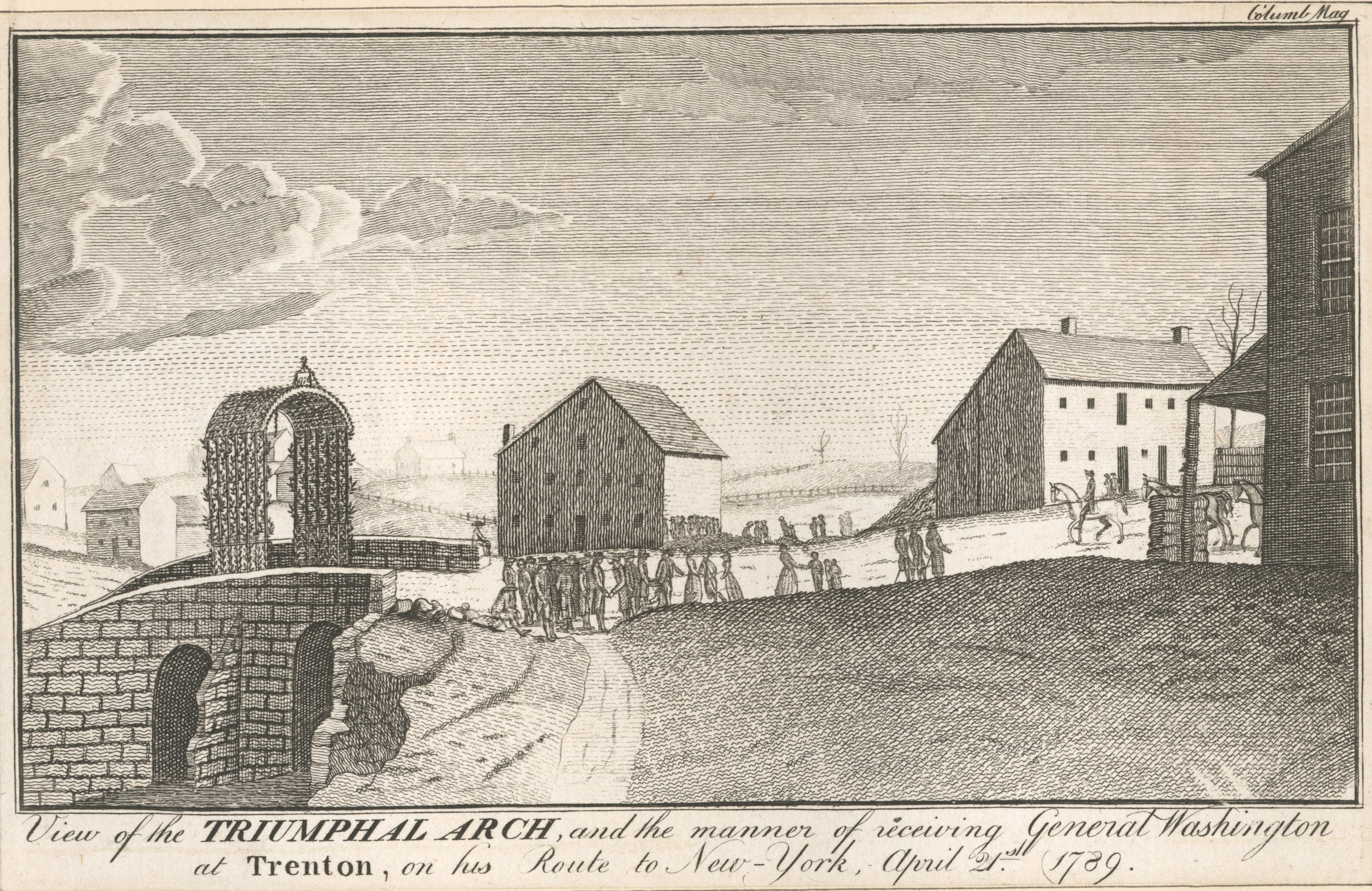
View of the Triumphal Arch, an illustration of George Washington's reception at Trenton, engraving attributed to James Trenchard, 1789

== See also ==
- Edward Trenchard – nephew
