= Charles H. Foy =

U.S. Navy sailor in the American Civil War

- Born: Charles Henry Foye c. 1809; Portsmouth, New Hampshire
- Died: 30 May 1866; New York City
- Burial place: Green-Wood Cemetery, Brooklyn, New York
- Military career
- Allegiance: United States of America; Union
- Branch: United States Navy; Union Navy
- Service years: 1861–1866
- Rank: Signal Quartermaster
- Unit: (United States Navy) USS Rhode Island
- Conflicts: American Civil War • Second Battle of Fort Fisher
- Awards: Medal of Honor

Charles Henry Foy or Foye (c. 1809 – 30 May 1866) was a sailor in the U.S. Navy during the American Civil War. He received the Medal of Honor for his actions during the Second Battle of Fort Fisher on 15 January 1865.

== Military service ==
Foy became a merchant seaman at age 18 in 1825. In his early 50s, Foy joined the Navy from Boston in July 1861, and was assigned to the Union steamer USS Rhode Island (1861).

On January 15, 1865, the North Carolina Confederate stronghold of Fort Fisher was taken by a combined Union storming party of sailors, marines, and soldiers under the command of Admiral David Dixon Porter and General Alfred Terry.

== Medal of Honor citation ==
The President of the United States of America, in the name of Congress, takes pleasure in presenting the Medal of Honor to Signal Quartermaster Charles H. Foy, United States Navy, for extraordinary heroism in action while serving on board the U.S.S. Rhode Island during the action with Fort Fisher and the Federal Point batteries, North Carolina, 13 to 15 January 1865. Carrying out his duties courageously during the battle, Signal Quartermaster Foy continued to be outstanding by his good conduct and faithful services throughout this engagement which resulted in a heavy casualty list when an attempt was made to storm Fort Fisher.

General Orders: War Department, General Orders No. 59 (June 22, 1865)

Action Date: January 15, 1865

Service: Navy

Rank: Signal Quartermaster

Division: U.S.S. Rhode Island

== See also ==
- List of Medal of Honor recipients
- List of American Civil War Medal of Honor recipients: A–F
