= John Jones (Medal of Honor) =

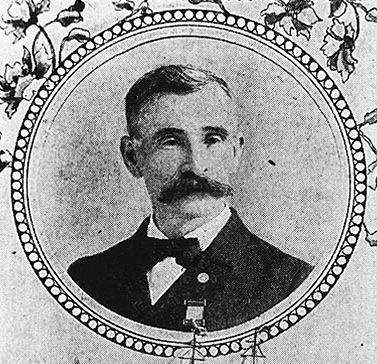
- Ordinary Seaman John Jones
- Born: August 25, 1841; Bridgeport, Connecticut, US
- Died: August 15, 1907 (aged 65)
- Burial place: St. Mary's Cemetery, Portsmouth, New Hampshire, US
- Military career
- Allegiance: United States of America; Union
- Branch: United States Navy; Union Navy
- Rank: Ordinary Seaman
- Unit: USS Rhode Island
- Conflicts: American Civil War
- Awards: Medal of Honor

John Jones (August 25, 1841 – August 15, 1907) was a United States Navy sailor and a recipient of America's highest military decoration — the Medal of Honor — for his actions in the American Civil War.

== Biography ==
As a Landsman serving on the USS Rhode Island, Jones assisted in the rescue of crew from the sinking ironclad USS Monitor.

Jones later reached the rank of Ordinary Seaman. He is buried in an unmarked grave in St. Mary's Cemetery, Portsmouth, New Hampshire.

== Medal of Honor citation ==
Landsman Jones' official Medal of Honor citation reads:

Served on board the U.S.S. Rhode Island, which was engaged in saving the lives of the officers and crew of the Monitor, 30 December 1862. Participating in the hazardous rescue of the officers and crew of the sinking Monitor, Jones, after rescuing several of the men, became separated in a heavy gale with other members of the cutter that had set out from the Rhode Island, and spent many hours in the small boat at the mercy of the weather and high seas until finally picked up by a schooner 50 miles east of Cape Hatteras

== See also ==
- List of American Civil War Medal of Honor recipients: G–L
