= Lewis A. Horton =

American sailor

Lewis Augustine Horton
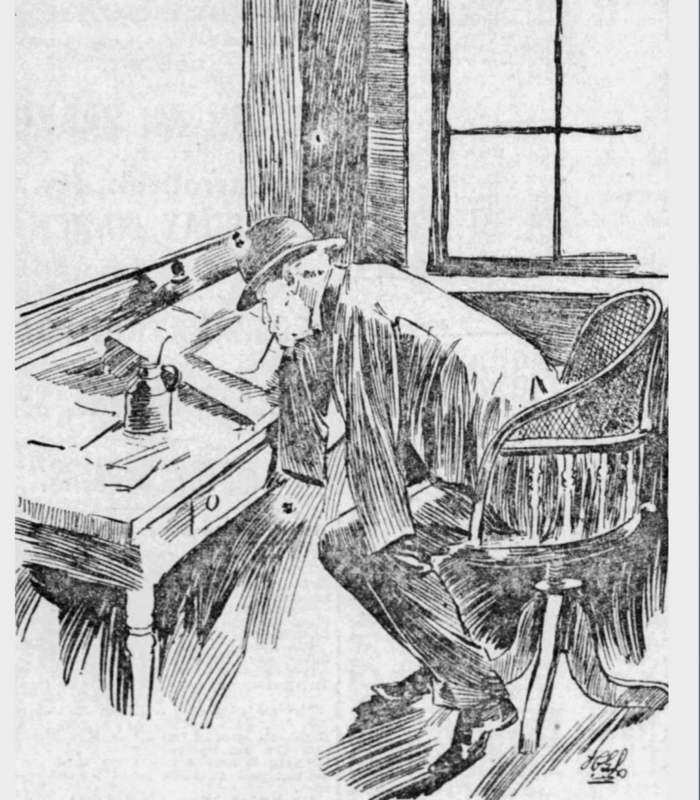
- Born: May 26, 1846; Bristol County, Massachusetts
- Died: June 8, 1916 (aged 70); Chelsea, Massachusetts
- Burial place: Forest Hill Cemetery, Massachusetts
- Spouse: Francis Ellen Cass Goodwin
- Military career
- Allegiance: United States of America
- Branch: United States Navy
- Rank: Seaman
- Unit: (United States Navy) USS Rhode Island
- Awards: Medal of Honor

Signature
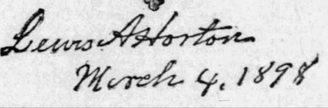

Lewis Augustine Horton (May 26, 1842 — June 8, 1916) was an American sailor in the Union Navy during the American Civil War and recipient of the Medal of Honor.

== Biography ==
Horton was born in Bristol County, Massachusetts on May 26, 1842. He enlisted in May 1861 at the beginning of the Civil War. During the first years of the war, he served as a seaman aboard the USS Massachusetts. In the summer of 1861, Horton along with 10 other sailors were captured by Confederate forces. Following a winter in Libby Prison, Richmond, Virginia, Horton was paroled in March 1862. Following his reenlistment, Horton was assigned to the USS Rhode Island. He earned his Medal of Honor on December 30, 1862, for helping rescue the crew of the USS Monitor during its sinking. Later on in the war, Horton lost both his arms following a gunnery accident on November 3, 1863. After the war, he worked in a U.S. Customs House in Boston. Horton was not aware he had earned the Medal of Honor until 1898. Horton died in 1916 and is now buried in Forest Hill Cemetery, Massachusetts.

== Medal of Honor Citation ==
Served on board the USS Rhode Island, which was engaged in saving the lives of the officers and crew of the Monitor, 30 December 1862. Participating in the hazardous rescue of the officers and crew of the sinking Monitor, Horton, after rescuing several of the men, became separated in a heavy gale with other members of the cutter that had set out from the Rhode Island, and spent many hours in the small boat at the mercy of the weather and the high seas until finally picked up by a schooner 50 miles east of Cape Hatteras.
