= Luke M. Griswold =

US Navy sailor & recipient of Medal of Honor (c. 1837-1892)

- Civil War era Navy Medal of Honor
- Born: c. 1837; Bloomfield, Connecticut
- Died: March 18, 1892 (aged 54–55); Springfield, Massachusetts
- Burial place: Oak Grove Cemetery; Springfield, Massachusetts
- Military career
- Allegiance: United States of America; Union
- Branch: United States Navy; Union Navy
- Service years: 1862 - 1863
- Rank: Ordinary seaman
- Unit: (United States Navy) USS Rhode Island
- Conflicts: American Civil War
- Awards: Medal of Honor

Luke M. Griswold (c. 1837-1892) was a recipient of the Medal of Honor. He was awarded the Medal of Honor "for extraordinary heroism in action while serving on board the U.S.S. Rhode Island which was engaged in saving the lives of the officers and crew of the U.S.S. Monitor, 30 December 1862 near Cape Hatteras, North Carolina. Participating in the hazardous rescue of the officers and crew of the sinking Monitor, Ordinary Seaman Griswold, after rescuing several of the men, became separated in a heavy gale with other members of the cutter that had set out from the Rhode Island, and spent many hours in the small boat at the mercy of the weather and high seas until finally picked up by a schooner 50 miles east of Cape Hatteras."
