= USS Vixen (1861) =

American naval ship

History

United States
- Acquired: 26 August 1861
- Commissioned: 31 July 1862
- Decommissioned: 8 November 1862
- Fate: Returned to the Coast Survey

General characteristics
- Displacement: 300 tons
- Armament: two 20-pounder Parrott rifles

USS Vixen was acquired by the Union Navy from the United States Coast Survey on 26 August 1861 for use as a reconnaissance vessel during the American Civil War; and was later commissioned on 31 July 1862.

== Service history ==
Vixen left New York City bound for Port Royal, South Carolina, in October 1861 with orders to conduct survey work along the southern coast en route. Escorted by USS Ottawa and USS Seneca, she entered Port Royal Sound on 4 November to place buoys in the channel preparatory to Flag Officer Samuel F. Du Pont's planned attack there, and drew scattered fire from the Confederate naval squadron under Commodore Josiah Tattnall III. The vessel conducted local surveys following the Union capture of the sound on the 7th, and reconnoitered Saint Helena Sound, South Carolina, on the 24th. In early December, a second survey was taken of St. Helena and, on the 18th, USS Pawnee, Seneca, and Vixen took possession of North and South Edisto Rivers, South Carolina, and drove a Confederate force from Rockville, South Carolina. Vixen became disabled in January 1862 and was sent to the New York Navy Yard for repairs.

Vixen—commissioned by the Union Navy on 31 July 1862—left the navy yard in August for Port Royal and duty with the South Atlantic Blockading Squadron. She arrived on the 12th and, on the 16th, received orders to report to the blockade at Ossabow Sound, Georgia. The gunboat participated in the expedition against the Confederate works at Pocotaligo, South Carolina, from 21 to 23 October, and returned to the New York Navy Yard shortly thereafter. Here, she was decommissioned on 8 November to be repaired and returned to the Coast Survey. The historical record detailing the remainder of Vixen's career is incomplete. However, after her transfer to the Coast Survey, she conducted numerous explorations of the rivers and inlets along the coast of Florida in early 1863 and 1864. She also participated in several routine patrol and reconnaissance expeditions along the southeastern coast during this time.
