= Gaillard Hunt =

American writer and civil servant (1862–1924)

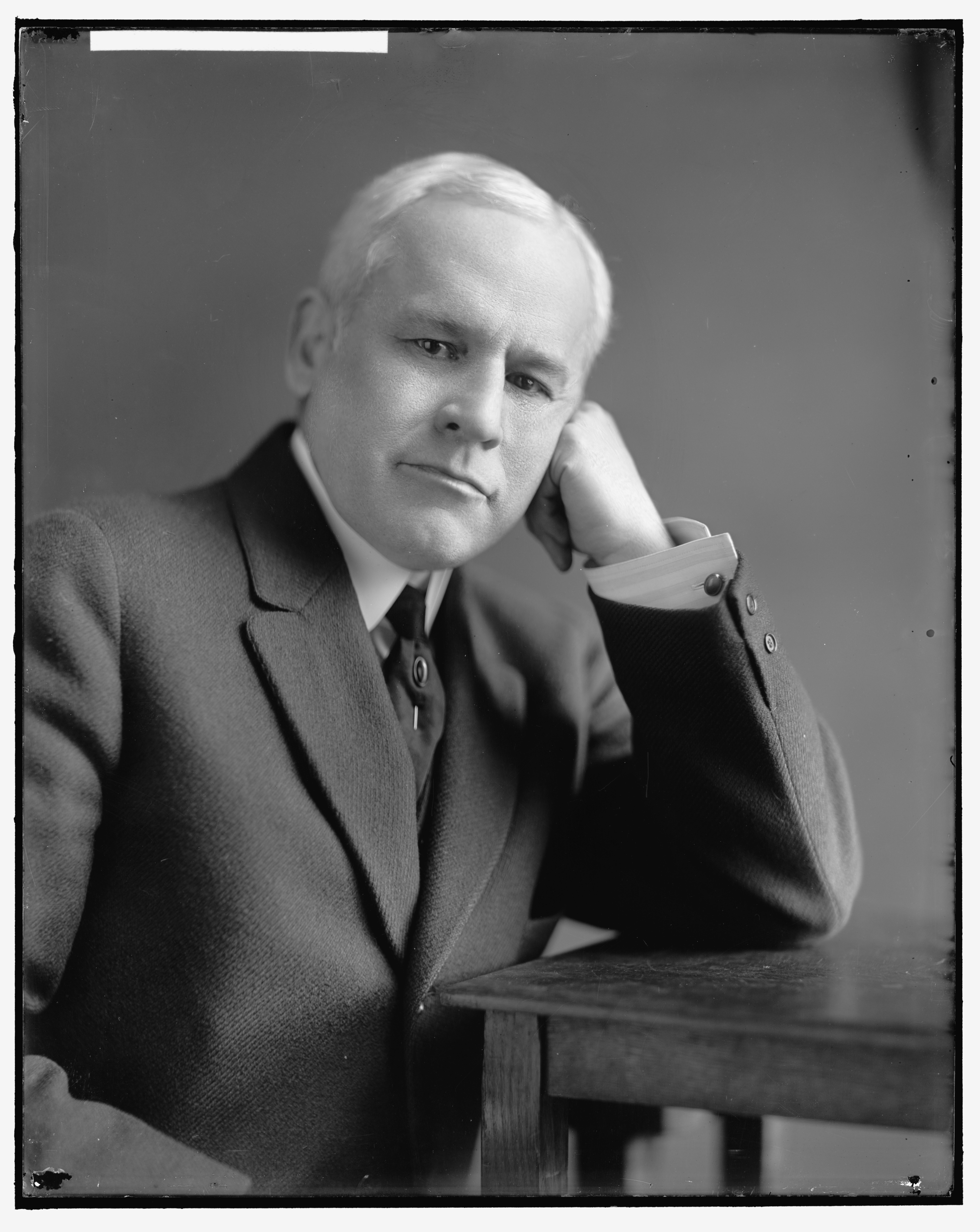
- Hunt, 1905–1924

1st Department of State Historian
- In office 1919–1924
- Preceded by: Position established
- Succeeded by: Harry Dwight

Personal details
- Born: September 8, 1862 New Orleans, Louisiana
- Died: March 20, 1924 (aged 61)

Gaillard Hunt (September 8, 1862 – March 20, 1924) was an American writer and civil servant. He is notable for his authorship of several works on James Madison and early American history.

== Early life ==
Hunt was born in New Orleans. He was the seventh child of his parents, William Henry Hunt, an attorney, and his second wife, Elizabeth Augusta Ridgely. Hunt attended the Ancient Hopkins Grammar School in New Haven, Connecticut, and at the Emerson Preparatory School Institute in Washington, D.C.. Hunt along with his family relocated there in 1878.

== Career ==
Beginning in 1882, Hunt began working for the government. His first five years he served as a clerk in the Pension Office. In 1887 he began employment with the Department of State, this lasted until 1909. From 1909 to 1917 he was chief of the division of manuscripts at The Library of Congress. He played an important role in the drafting of legislation on citizenship and naturalization, for which he wrote a book about, along with a work about the history of the Department of State in 1914.

== Works ==
- 1892, Fragments of revolutionary history. Being hitherto unpublished writings of the men of the American Revolution
- James Madison and religious liberty. Washington, D.C.: Government Printing Office. 1902.
- The Life of James Madison. New York: Doubleday, Page & Co. 1902.
- 1908, John C. Calhoun
- 1914, Life in America one hundred years ago
- 1914, The department of state of the United States; its history and functions
- 1917, Virginia declaration of rights and Cardinal Bellarmine

Several of Hunt's works have been republished in electronic form. Available works include:

- "The Debates in the Federal Convention of 1787"
- "The Department of State of the United States: Its History and Functions" (1914)

== Sources ==
- —— (1932). Dictionary of American biography. Vol. IX.
  New York: Charles Scribner's Sons.
