= Columbian Magazine =

American Literary Periodical

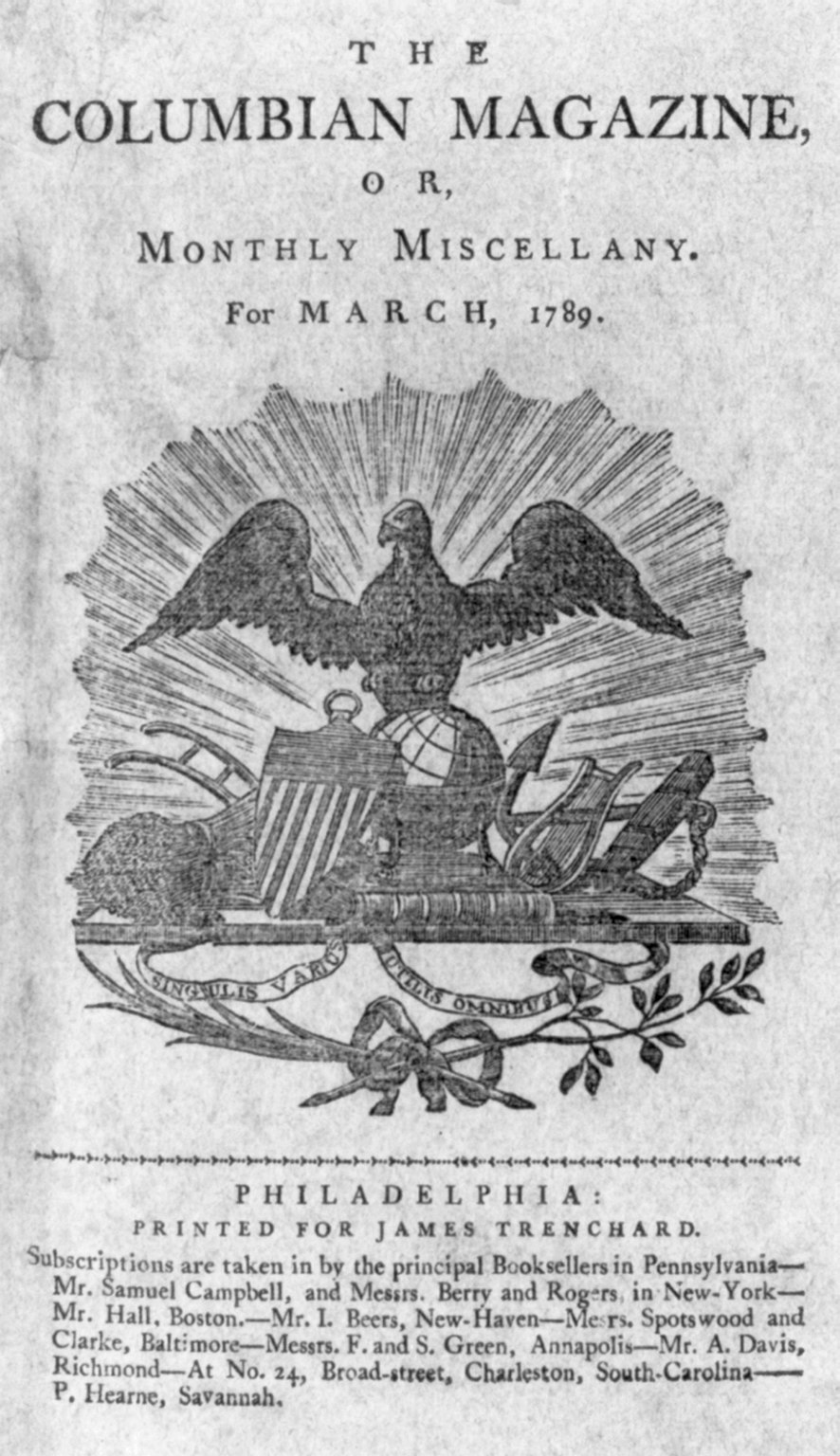
- Cover page from March, 1789
- Publisher: Mathew Carey
- Founded: September 1786
- First issue: 1786; 239 years ago
- Final issue: 1792

The Columbian Magazine, also known as the Columbian Magazine or Monthly Miscellany, was a monthly American literary magazine established by Mathew Carey, Charles Cist, William Spotswood, Thomas Seddon, and James Trenchard. It was published in Philadelphia from 1786 to 1792. Carey left the magazine in 1787 to start The American Museum. Subsequent publishers were Spotswood (1787–1788), Trenchard (1789–1790), and William Young (1790–1792).

== See also ==
- The American Museum
