= USS LST-871 =

1944 LST-542-class tank landing ship

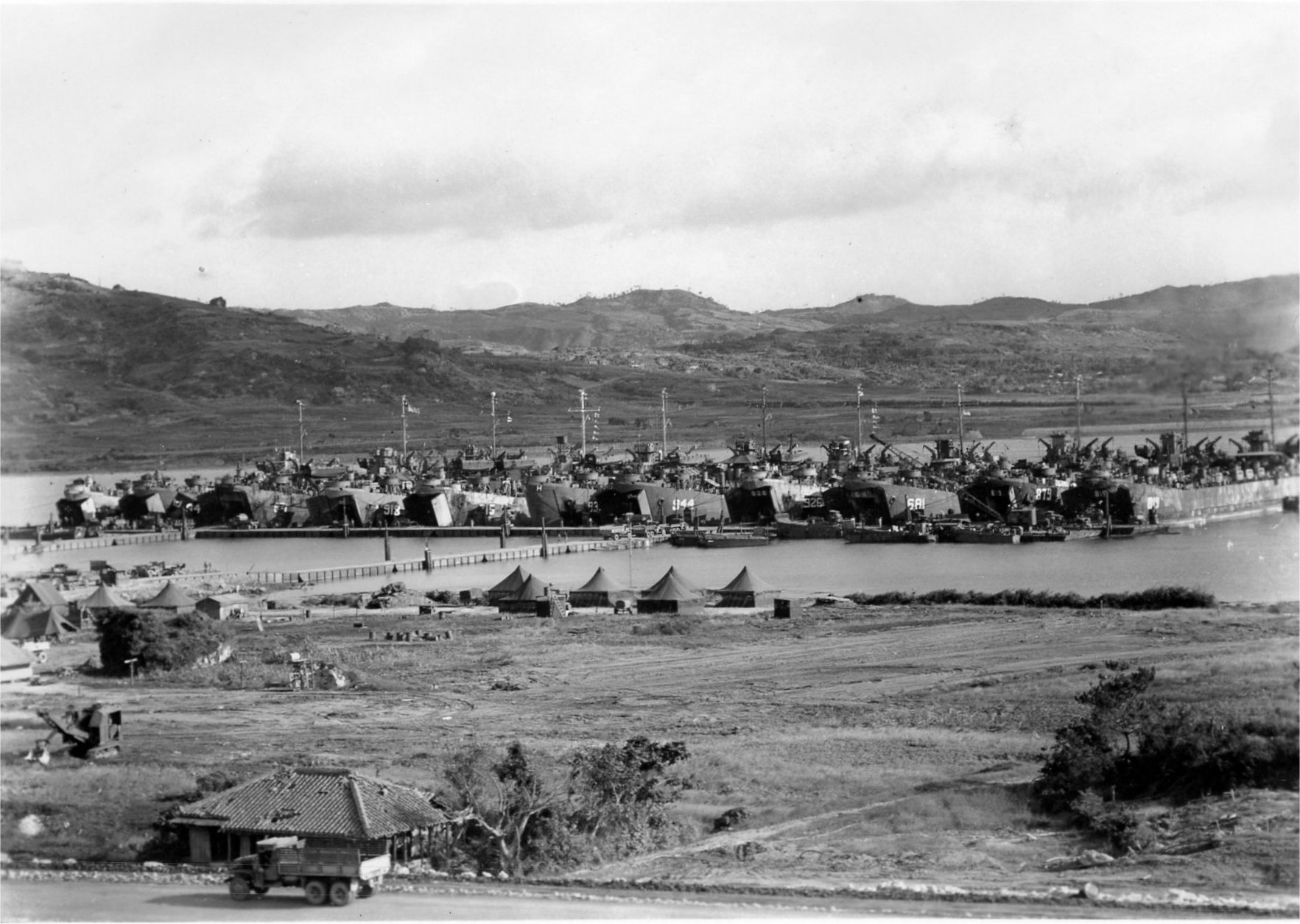
- Eleven LSTs moored at the Yonabaru Pier, Okinawa, 23 July 1945. From right to left: LST-819, LST-879, LST-681, LST-926, LST-944, LST(H)-?, LST-715, LST-918, LST-871, ?, ?. US Navy photo 21st USNCB Neg. No. 204.

History

United States
- Name: LST-871
- Builder: Jeffersonville Boat & Machinery Co., Jeffersonville, Indiana
- Laid down: 9 November 1944
- Launched: 20 December 1944
- Commissioned: 18 January 1945
- Decommissioned: 4 October 1946
- Reclassified: Landing Ship Tank (Hospital), 15 September 1945
- Stricken: 13 November 1946
- Identification: Hull symbol: LST-871; Hull symbol: LST(H)-871; Code letters: NIUX
- Fate: Sold for commercial operations, 30 June 1948

General characteristics
- Class & type: LST-542-class tank landing ship
- Displacement: 1,625 long tons (1,651 t) (light); 4,080 long tons (4,145 t) (full (seagoing draft with 1,675 short tons (1,520 t) load); 2,366 long tons (2,404 t) (beaching)
- Length: 328 ft (100 m) oa
- Beam: 50 ft (15 m)
- Draft: Unloaded: 2 ft 4 in (0.71 m) forward; 7 ft 6 in (2.29 m) aft; Full load: 8 ft 3 in (2.51 m) forward; 14 ft 1 in (4.29 m) aft; Landing with 500 short tons (450 t) load: 3 ft 11 in (1.19 m) forward; 9 ft 10 in (3.00 m) aft; Limiting 11 ft 2 in (3.40 m); Maximum navigation 14 ft 1 in (4.29 m)
- Installed power: 2 × 900 hp (670 kW) Electro-Motive Diesel 12-567A diesel engines; 1,800 shp (1,300 kW)
- Propulsion: 1 × Falk main reduction gears; 2 × Propellers
- Speed: 11.6 kn (21.5 km/h; 13.3 mph)
- Range: 24,000 nmi (44,000 km; 28,000 mi) at 9 kn (17 km/h; 10 mph) while displacing 3,960 long tons (4,024 t)
- Boats & landing craft carried: 2 x LCVPs
- Capacity: 1,600–1,900 short tons (3,200,000–3,800,000 lb; 1,500,000–1,700,000 kg) cargo depending on mission
- Troops: 16 officers, 147 enlisted men
- Complement: 13 officers, 104 enlisted men
- Armament: Varied, ultimate armament; 2 × twin 40 mm (1.57 in) Bofors guns; 4 × single 40 mm Bofors guns; 12 × 20 mm (0.79 in) Oerlikon cannons

Service record
- Part of: LST Flotilla 32

USS LST-871 was an LST-542-class tank landing ship in the United States Navy. Like many of her class, she was not named and is properly referred to by her hull designation.

== Construction ==
LST-871 was laid down on 9 November 1944, at Jeffersonville, Indiana, by the Jeffersonville Boat & Machinery Co.; launched on 20 December 1944; and commissioned on 18 January 1945.

== Service history ==
During World War II LST-871 was assigned to the Asiatic-Pacific theater.

LST-871 was redesignated LSTH-871 on 15 September 1945. Following World War II, LSTH-871 performed occupation duty in the Far East until early May 1946. She returned to the United States and was decommissioned on 4 October 1946 and struck from the Navy list on 13 November that same year. On 30 June 1948, the ship was sold to the Humble Oil & Refining Co. in Houston, Texas, for operation.

The ship's wartime commanding officer, Frank W. Summers, USNR, was promoted to lieutenant commander by the end of his command, and later served as Chief Justice of the Louisiana Supreme Court.

== Bibliography ==
- "LST-871". Dictionary of American Naval Fighting Ships. Naval History and Heritage Command. This article incorporates text from this source, which is in the public domain.
- "USS LST-871". NavSource. 26 January 2018.
- ""Former chief justice of state Supreme Court dies Tuesday"". Abbeville Meridional. 27 January 1993. pp. 1, 5.
