= USS LST-944 =

1944 LST-542-class tank landing ship

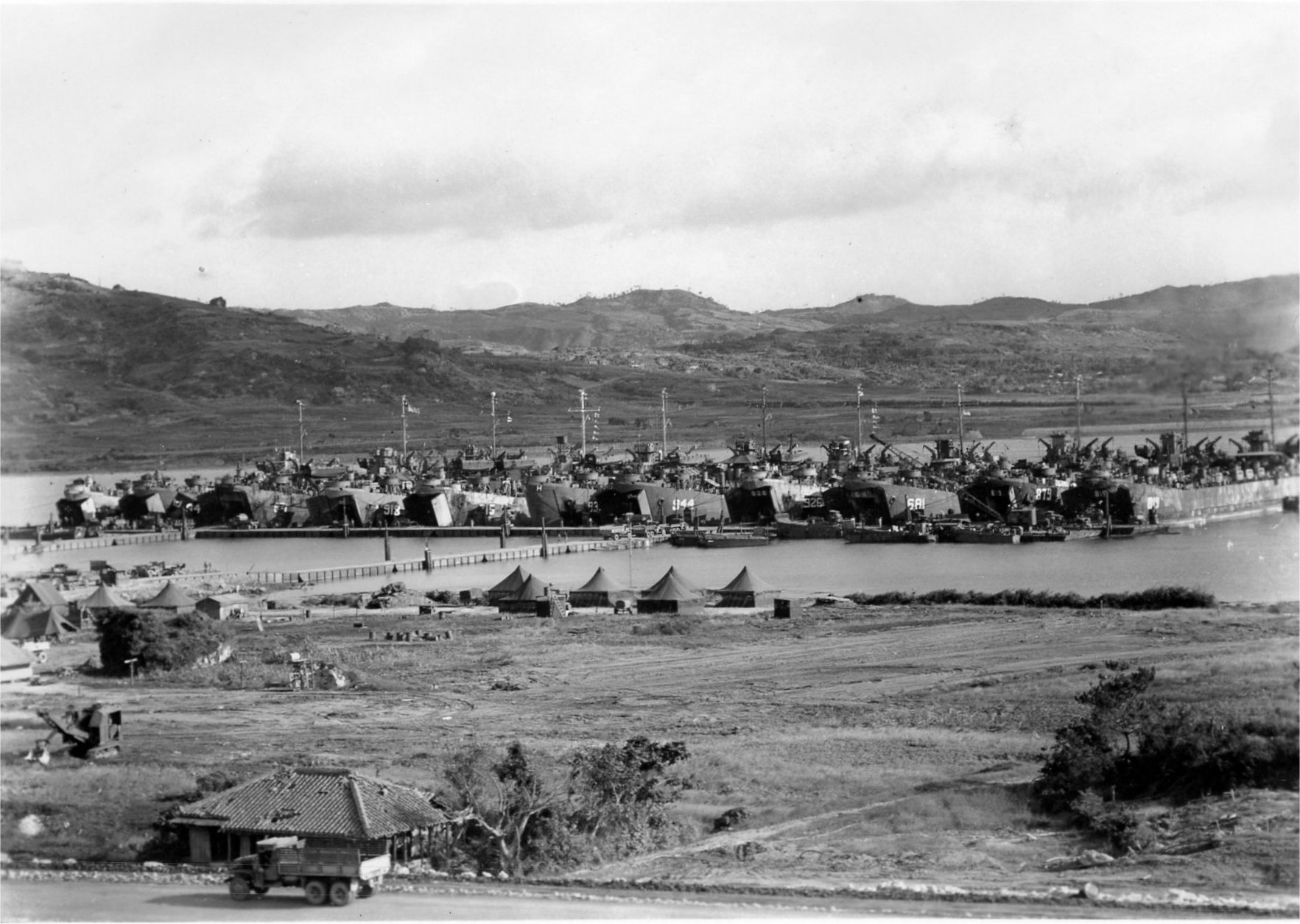
- Eleven LSTs moored at the Yonabaru Pier, Okinawa, 23 July 1945. From right to left: LST-819, LST-879, LST-681, LST-926, LST-944, LST(H)-?, LST-715, LST-918, LST-871, ?, ?. US Navy photo 21st USNCB Neg. No. 204.

History

United States
- Name: LST-944
- Builder: Bethlehem-Hingham Shipyard, Hingham, Massachusetts
- Yard number: 3414
- Laid down: 11 August 1944
- Launched: 3 September 1944
- Commissioned: 4 October 1944
- Decommissioned: 9 December 1945
- Stricken: 8 January 1946
- Identification: Hull symbol: LST-944; Code letters: NEGF
- Honors and awards: 2 × battle star
- Fate: Sold for scrapping, 26 September 1947

General characteristics
- Class & type: LST-542-class tank landing ship
- Displacement: 1,625 long tons (1,651 t) (light); 4,080 long tons (4,145 t) (full (seagoing draft with 1,675 short tons (1,520 t) load); 2,366 long tons (2,404 t) (beaching)
- Length: 328 ft (100 m) oa
- Beam: 50 ft (15 m)
- Draft: Unloaded: 2 ft 4 in (0.71 m) forward; 7 ft 6 in (2.29 m) aft; Full load: 8 ft 3 in (2.51 m) forward; 14 ft 1 in (4.29 m) aft; Landing with 500 short tons (450 t) load: 3 ft 11 in (1.19 m) forward; 9 ft 10 in (3.00 m) aft; Limiting 11 ft 2 in (3.40 m); Maximum navigation 14 ft 1 in (4.29 m)
- Installed power: 2 × 900 hp (670 kW) Electro-Motive Diesel 12-567A diesel engines; 1,800 shp (1,300 kW)
- Propulsion: 1 × Falk main reduction gears; 2 × Propellers
- Speed: 11.6 kn (21.5 km/h; 13.3 mph)
- Range: 24,000 nmi (44,000 km; 28,000 mi) at 9 kn (17 km/h; 10 mph) while displacing 3,960 long tons (4,024 t)
- Boats & landing craft carried: 2 x LCVPs
- Capacity: 1,600–1,900 short tons (3,200,000–3,800,000 lb; 1,500,000–1,700,000 kg) cargo depending on mission
- Troops: 16 officers, 147 enlisted men
- Complement: 13 officers, 104 enlisted men
- Armament: Varied, ultimate armament; 2 × twin 40 mm (1.57 in) Bofors guns; 4 × single 40 mm Bofors guns; 12 × 20 mm (0.79 in) Oerlikon cannons

Service record
- Part of: LST Flotilla 25
- Operations: Assault and occupation of Iwo Jima (20–28 February 1945); Assault and occupation of Okinawa Gunto (17 April–7 June 1945)
- Awards: American Campaign Medal; Asiatic–Pacific Campaign Medal; World War II Victory Medal

USS LST-944 was an LST-542-class tank landing ship in the United States Navy. Like many of her class, she was not named and is properly referred to by her hull designation.

== Construction ==
LST-944 was laid down on 11 August 1944, at Hingham, Massachusetts, by the Bethlehem-Hingham Shipyard; launched on 3 September 1944; and commissioned on 4 October 1944.

== Service history ==
During World War II LST-944 was assigned to the Asiatic-Pacific theater and participated in the assault and occupation of Iwo Jima in February 1945, and the assault and occupation of Okinawa Gunto from April through June 1945.

She returned to the United States and was decommissioned on 19 December 1945, and struck from the Navy list on 8 January 1946. On 26 September 1947, the ship was sold to the Boston Metals Co., of Baltimore, Maryland, for scrapping.

== Awards ==
LST-944 earned two battle star for World War II service.

== Bibliography ==
Online resources

- "LST-944". Dictionary of American Naval Fighting Ships. Naval History and Heritage Command. This article incorporates text from this source, which is in the public domain.
- "Bethlehem-Hingham, Hingham MA". www.ShipbuildingHistory.com. 11 August 2011.
- "USS LST-944". NavSource. 6 November 2015.
