= DeKalb =

DeKalb or De Kalb may refer to:

== People ==
- Johann de Kalb (1721–1780), German-born quartermaster general in the French Army during the Seven Years' War and major general in the Continental Army during the American Revolutionary War, styled Baron de Kalb

== Places ==
=== United States ===
==== Municipalities ====
- DeKalb, Illinois, DeKalb County; the largest city in the United States named DeKalb
- De Kalb, Mississippi, Kemper County
- De Kalb, Missouri, Buchanan County
- De Kalb, New York, St. Lawrence County
- DeKalb, Ohio, Crawford County
- De Kalb, Texas, Bowie County
- De Kalb, West Virginia, Gilmer County

==== Counties ====
- DeKalb County, Alabama
- DeKalb County, Georgia
- DeKalb County, Illinois
- DeKalb County, Indiana
- DeKalb County, Missouri
- DeKalb County, Tennessee

==== Street names ====
- DeKalb Avenue, Brooklyn, New York
- De Kalb Drive, Calabasas, California
- Along US Route 202 in Montgomery County, there are stretches designated:
  - East Dekalb Pike
  - West Dekalb Pike
  - Dekalb Street

==== Townships ====
- DeKalb Township, DeKalb County, Illinois

== Public transit ==
- DeKalb Avenue (BMT Canarsie Line), a stop on the L train at Wyckoff Avenue, Brooklyn, New York
- DeKalb Avenue (BMT Fourth Avenue Line), a stop on the Fourth Avenue and Brighton lines at Flatbush Avenue, Brooklyn, New York
- DeKalb Avenue Line, now the B38 DeKalb/Lafayette Avenues bus route, Brooklyn and Queens, New York
- DeKalb Street station, near US 202, a SEPTA Regional Rail station, Bridgeport, Pennsylvania

== Ships ==
- USS Baron DeKalb, an American Civil War ironclad river gunboat formerly known as USS Saint Louis and used by the United States Army
- USS DeKalb, a decommissioned U.S. Navy ship previously known as Prinz Eitel Friedrich
- USS DeKalb County, a twice-decommissioned U.S. Navy ship

== Schools ==
- DeKalb School of the Arts, a magnet school in DeKalb County, Georgia
- DeKalb High School (disambiguation)

== Corporations ==
- DeKalb Genetics Corporation, a hybrid corn seed producer
- DeKalb Commercial Body Corporation, defunct manufacturer of vocational truck bodies

== Other ==
- DeKalb–Peachtree Airport (PDK), Chamblee, DeKalb County, Georgia
- deKalb receptor, a fictional device in the science fiction story "Waldo" by Robert A. Heinlein

== See also ==
- Kalp (disambiguation)
