= Charles Robinson (Medal of Honor) =

American Civil War sailor and Medal of Honor recipient

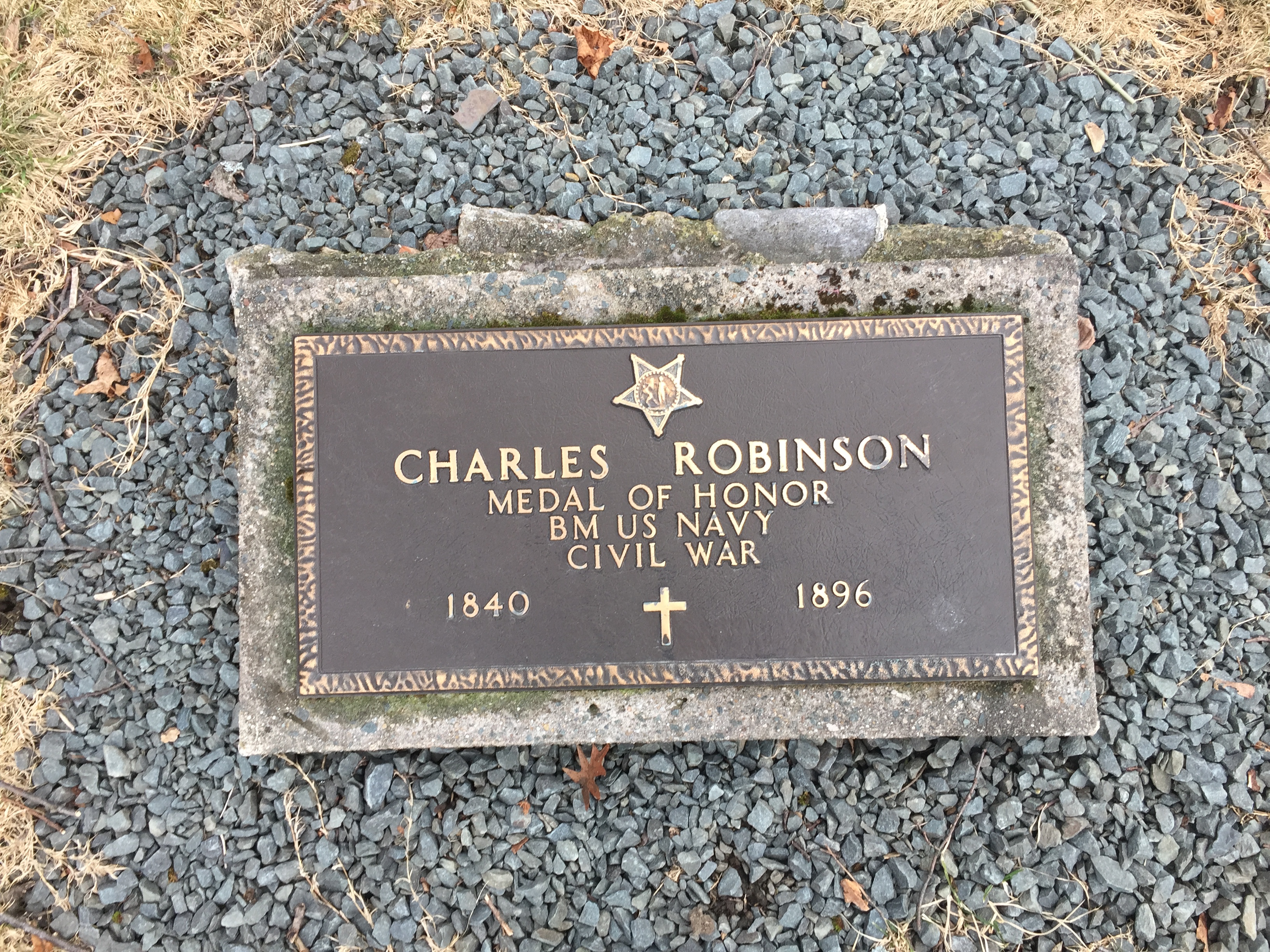
- Charles Robinson Grave, Holy Cross Cemetery, Halifax, Nova Scotia
- Born: 1840; Dundee, Scotland
- Died: 21 April 1896 (aged 55–56)
- Burial place: Holy Cross Cemetery, Halifax, Nova Scotia, Canada
- Military career
- Allegiance: United States
- Branch: United States Navy
- Rank: Boatswain's Mate
- Unit: (United States Navy) USS Baron DeKalb
- Conflicts: American Civil War
- Awards: Medal of Honor

Charles Robinson (1840 – 21 April 1896) was a Union Navy sailor in the American Civil War and a recipient of the U.S. military's highest decoration, the Medal of Honor, for his actions during an expedition on the Yazoo River.

Born in 1840 in Dundee, Scotland, Robinson moved to the United States and was living in New York City when he joined the U.S. Navy. During the Civil War, he served as a boatswain's mate on the USS Baron DeKalb. From 23 to 27 December 1862, he "distinguished himself in the various actions" as his ship took part in an expedition up the Yazoo River in Mississippi. For this action, he was awarded the Medal of Honor months later on 3 April 1863. Three of his shipmates, Ordinary Seaman Peter Cotton, Captain of the Forecastle Pierre Leon, and Boatswain's Mate John McDonald, also received the medal for their part in the expedition.

Robinson's official Medal of Honor citation reads:

Serving on board the U.S.S. Baron de Kalb, Yazoo River Expedition, 23 to 27 December 1862. Proceeding under orders up the Yazoo River, the U.S.S. Baron de Kalb, with the object of capturing or destroying the enemy's transports, came upon the steamers John Walsh, R. J. Locklan, Golden Age, and the Scotland sunk on a bar where they were ordered fired. Continuing up the river, she was fired on by the enemy, but upon returning the fire, caused the rebels to retreat. Returning down the Yazoo, she destroyed and captured large quantities of enemy equipment and several prisoners. Serving bravely throughout this action, Robinson, as boatswain's mate, "distinguished himself in the various actions."

After the war, Charles moved to the Prospect, Nova Scotia and married Norah and later set up home in Halifax. Robinson had a career as a policeman and storekeeper. Robinson died on 21 April 1896, at age 55 or 56 and was buried in Halifax, Nova Scotia, Canada.

== See also ==
- Military history of Nova Scotia
