= DeKalb County =

DeKalb County may refer to one of several counties in the United States, all of which were named for Baron Johann de Kalb:

- DeKalb County, Alabama
- DeKalb County, Georgia
- DeKalb County, Illinois
- DeKalb County, Indiana
- DeKalb County, Missouri
- DeKalb County, Tennessee

== See also ==
- DeKalb (disambiguation)
