= USS Orange County =

WWII navy landing ship

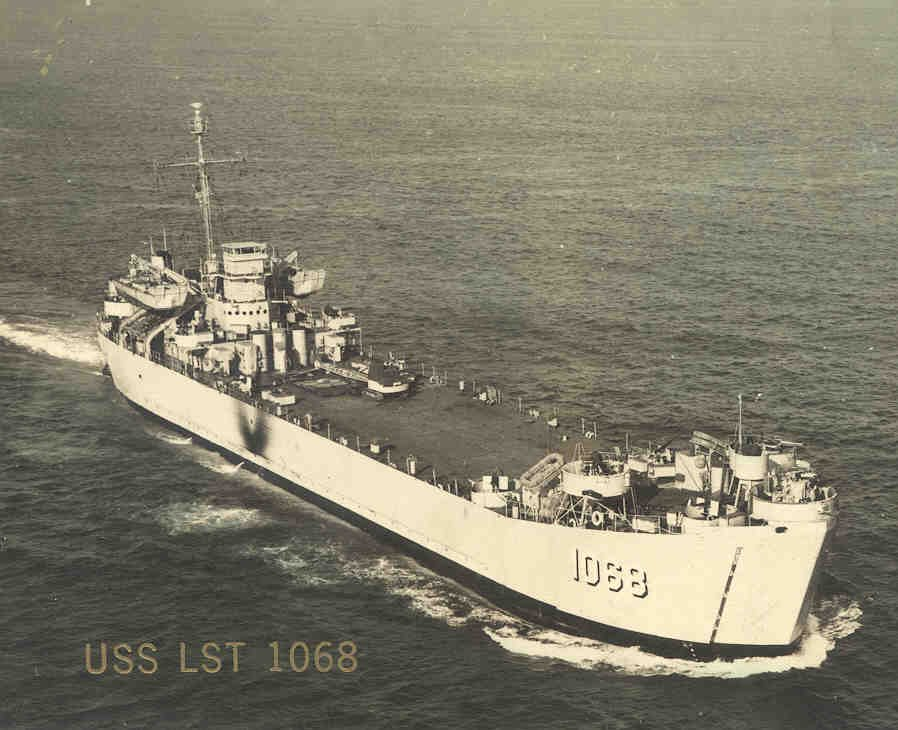
- USS LST-1068 off the coast of San Diego, returning from a tour of duty in Korea during the Korean War

History

United States
- Name: LST-1068; Orange County
- Builder: Bethlehem-Hingham Shipyard, Hingham, Massachusetts
- Yard number: 3458
- Laid down: 31 January 1945
- Launched: 3 March 1945
- Commissioned: 27 March 1945
- Decommissioned: 9 August 1946
- Identification: Hull symbol: LST-1068; Code letters: NAIJ
- Fate: Laid up in the Pacific Reserve Fleet, Astoria Group
- Recommissioned: 8 September 1950
- Decommissioned: 15 October 1957
- Renamed: Orange County, 1 July 1955
- Stricken: 27 September 1957
- Honors and awards: 4 × battle stars (Korea)
- Fate: Sunk as a target ship, 18 June 1958

General characteristics
- Class & type: LST-542-class tank landing ship
- Displacement: 1,625 long tons (1,651 t) (light); 4,080 long tons (4,145 t) (full (seagoing draft with 1,675 short tons (1,520 t) load); 2,366 long tons (2,404 t) (beaching)
- Length: 328 ft (100 m) oa
- Beam: 50 ft (15 m)
- Draft: Unloaded: 2 ft 4 in (0.71 m) forward; 7 ft 6 in (2.29 m) aft; Full load: 8 ft 3 in (2.51 m) forward; 14 ft 1 in (4.29 m) aft; Landing with 500 short tons (450 t) load: 3 ft 11 in (1.19 m) forward; 9 ft 10 in (3.00 m) aft; Limiting 11 ft 2 in (3.40 m); Maximum navigation 14 ft 1 in (4.29 m)
- Installed power: 2 × 900 hp (670 kW) Electro-Motive Diesel 12-567A diesel engines; 1,800 shp (1,300 kW)
- Propulsion: 1 × Falk main reduction gears; 2 × Propellers
- Speed: 11.6 kn (21.5 km/h; 13.3 mph)
- Range: 24,000 nmi (44,000 km; 28,000 mi) at 9 kn (17 km/h; 10 mph) while displacing 3,960 long tons (4,024 t)
- Boats & landing craft carried: 2 x LCVPs
- Capacity: 1,600–1,900 short tons (3,200,000–3,800,000 lb; 1,500,000–1,700,000 kg) cargo depending on mission
- Troops: 16 officers, 147 enlisted men
- Complement: 13 officers, 104 enlisted men
- Armament: Varied, ultimate armament; 2 × twin 40 mm (1.57 in) Bofors guns; 4 × single 40 mm Bofors guns; 12 × 20 mm (0.79 in) Oerlikon cannons

Service record
- Part of: LST Flotilla 33
- Awards: World War II; American Campaign Medal; Asiatic–Pacific Campaign Medal; World War II Victory Medal; Navy Occupation Service Medal w/Asia Clasp; Korean War; National Defense Service Medal; Korean Service Medal; United Nations Service Medal; Republic of Korea War Service Medal

USS Orange County (LST–1068) was an LST-542-class tank landing ship built for the United States Navy during World War II. Unlike many of her class, which received only numbers and were disposed of after World War II, she survived long enough to be named. On 1 July 1955, all LSTs still in commission were named for US counties or parishes; LST-1068 was given the name Orange County, for counties in the states of California, Florida, Indiana, New York, North Carolina, Texas, Vermont, and Virginia, she was the only US Naval vessel to bear the name.

== Construction ==
LST-1068 was laid down on 31 January 1945, at Hingham, Massachusetts, by the Bethlehem-Hingham Shipyard; the ship was launched on 3 March 1945, sponsored by Mrs. Alice R. Wilbur; and commissioned on 27 March 1945.

== Service history ==
=== World War II ===
After shakedown in Chesapeake Bay, LST-1068 loaded pontoon causeways and LCT sections at Davisville, Rhode Island, and embarked men at New York prior to getting underway, on 11 May, for the Pacific via the Panama Canal. On 27 June, she departed Pearl Harbor for Guam via Eniwetok.

LST-1068 cleared Apra Harbor, Guam, with a group of LSTs on 11 August, en route to Saipan. From Saipan she returned to Okinawa, arriving on 28 August 1945. She was forced out to sea from her anchorage on 16 September, to ride out a violent storm which lasted for three days and nights. On 22 September, she loaded elements of the Fifth Air Force for transport to Yokohama, Japan.

After discharging the Air Corps personnel on 27 September, LST-1068 sailed on 1 October, from Tokyo Bay, for the little port of Ominato, where she was to drop off a Port Director Unit. On 12 October, she was underway again bound for Manila via Yokohama. Arriving in Manila Bay on 26 October, LST-1068 remained for five days and then moved to Batangas and loaded occupation troops to return to Tokyo. She arrived in Tokyo on 14 November. On 28 November, at Saipan, LST-1068 exchanged low-point crew members for high-point personnel of other LSTs and on 14 December, she sailed for Pearl Harbor. From Pearl Harbor she was ordered to San Francisco for pre-deactivation overhaul and then to Bremerton, Washington, for decommissioning.

LST-1068 decommissioned on 9 August 1946, and was placed in reserve at Astoria, Oregon.

=== Korean War ===
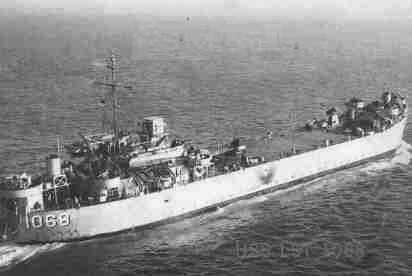
LST-1068 at sea, date and location unknown.

Recommissioned on 8 September 1950, LST-1068 went through her second shakedown cruise and then sailed to the Far East via San Diego. Her actual departure was delayed, however, while she underwent repairs for a hole torn in her bottom by striking a submerged LCI.

Repaired and loaded, she sailed in January 1951, with a scheduled stop at Pearl. In February, LST-1068 arrived in Yokosuka, and the following month she made her first entrance into Korean waters. Through May, she was engaged in operations at Inchon, and in June, was on her way back to the US. Following overhaul, training and upkeep, which lasted for several months, she returned to the Far East in January 1952.

LST-1068 carried out a rigorous schedule which kept her busy until October, landing troops and supplies and shipping prisoners. She participated in operations at Sokchori, Koje-do, and Wonsan, with brief but frequent trips to Pusan, Cho-do, and Yokosuka, Japan. LST-1068 returned to the US again in October, arriving in San Diego around Thanksgiving. The s:Korean Armistice Agreement was signed on 27 July 1953, at the time that LST-1068 was preparing for her third deployment.

=== Post-war ===
She departed San Diego, on 1 August, with the landing craft repair ship Satyr and LST-819. Arriving in Japan on 21 September, and following a three-week stay at Yokosuka, she proceeded to Kobe, and then to Sasebo. During November, she participated in a series of training exercises at Tokchok-to, Korea, an island near Inchon.

In January 1954, LST-1068 conducted training at Okinawa, and in March, at Iwo Jima, she was involved in the largest training operation she had ever experienced. On 17 June, she joined with five LSTs of LST Division 13, for a return passage to San Diego. Upon arrival she was assigned primarily local operations and periods of upkeep. December 1954 and January 1955, were spent in overhaul at San Pedro, Los Angeles. The ship was renamed Orange County on 1 July 1955.

== Decommissioning ==
Orange County continued to provide a vital service to the Navy until she decommissioned on 15 October 1957. The ship was struck from the Naval Vessel Register on 27 September 1957, and subsequently sunk as a target ship on 18 June 1958.

== Awards ==
LST-1068 earned four battle stars for her Korean War service.

== Bibliography ==
Online resources

- "LST-1068". Dictionary of American Naval Fighting Ships. Naval History and Heritage Command. This article incorporates text from this source, which is in the public domain.
- "Orange County". Dictionary of American Naval Fighting Ships. Naval History and Heritage Command. 17 August 2015. This article incorporates text from this source, which is in the public domain.
- "Bethlehem-Hingham, Hingham MA". ShipbuildingHistory.com. 11 August 2011.
- "USNS T-LST-1068". NavSource. 9 September 2016.
