= Prospect, Nova Scotia =

Community in Nova Scotia, Canada

Prospect
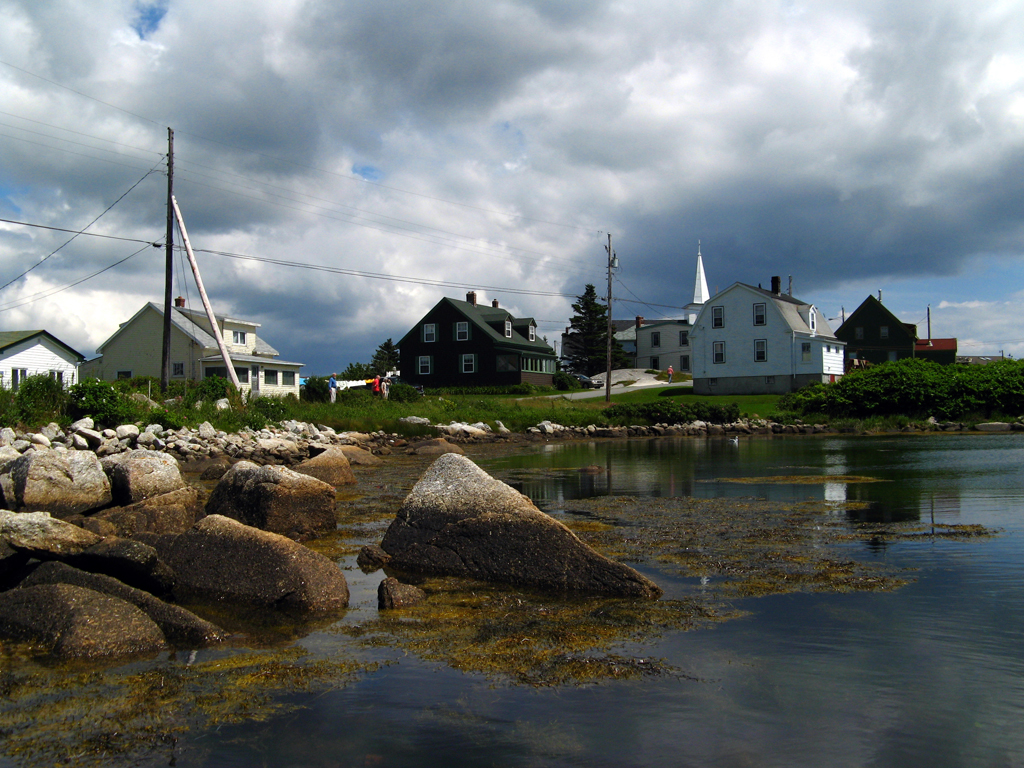
- Prospect viewed from Prospect Harbour.

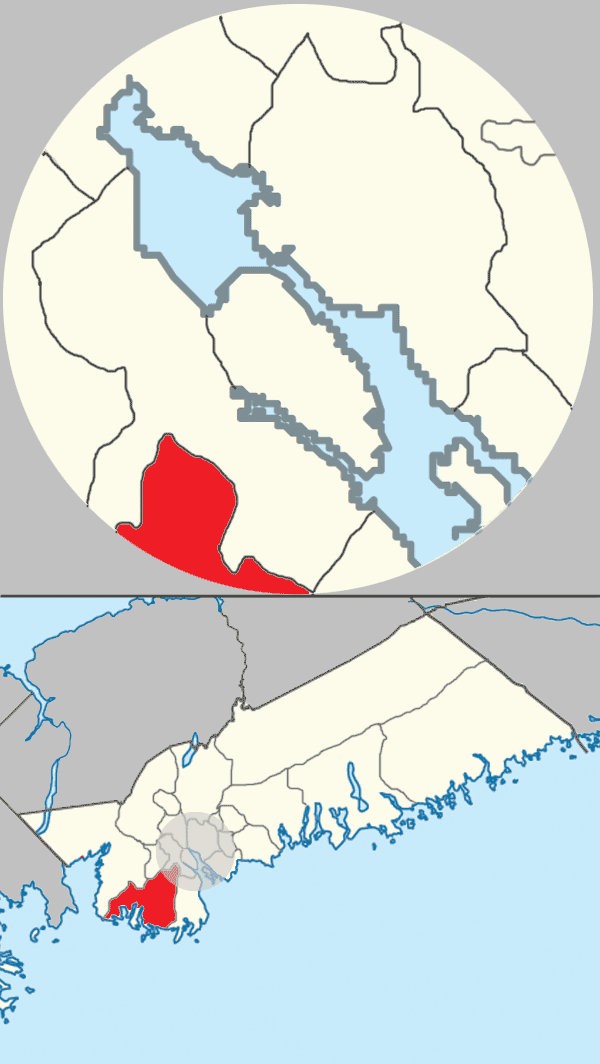
- Prospect planning area of municipal Halifax

- Location within Nova Scotia
- Coordinates: 44°28′09″N 63°46′58″W
- Country: Canada
- Province: Nova Scotia
- Municipality: Halifax Regional Municipality
- Founded: 1754

Government
  - Council: Western Region Community Council
- Time zone: UTC-4 (AST)
- Postal code span: B3T
- Area code: 902
- Telephone Exchange: 852,850
- Part of a series about Places in Nova Scotia

Prospect is a Canadian coastal community on the Chebucto Peninsula in Nova Scotia, Canada within the Halifax Regional Municipality.

It borders the Atlantic Ocean approximately 23 kilometres (14 mi) southwest of Halifax off the Prospect Road (Route 333).

During the American Revolution, fishermen at Prospect captured an American privateer vessel and 23 crew members.

In 2003, the town was hit by the eye of Hurricane Juan. Wind damage was substantial and storm surge washed away many wharfs and stages, but no homes. The area suffered significant land erosion due to the impact.

== Electoral districts ==
- Federal- South Shore-St. Margarets
- Provincial- Timberlea-Prospect
- Municipal - Historically: District 22: Timberlea Prospect

There are no churches in Prospect since the closing of Our Lady of Mt. Carmel. Nearby are St. Joseph (Shad Bay), New Life Community Church (Hatchet Lake), St. Timothy's (Brookside), and St. James (Goodwood).

== Notable residents ==
- Charles Robinson (Medal of Honor)
