= De Kalb, West Virginia =

Unincorporated community in West Virginia, United States

Coordinates: 38°56′33″N 80°55′55″W

De Kalb is an unincorporated community in Gilmer County, in the U.S. state of West Virginia.

== History ==
A post office called De Kalb was established in De Kalb, the name was changed to Dekalb in 1894, and the post office was discontinued in 1941. The community was named after Johann de Kalb by a local admirer.
