= DeKalb Commercial Body Corporation =

Defunct manufacturer of wagons and vocational truck bodies

- Formerly: Sycamore Wagon Works (1904–1912); DeKalb Wagon Company (1912–1917); DeKalb Commercial Body Co. (1917–1941)
- Industry: Automotive industry
- Genre: Trucks
- Predecessor: Shipman, Bradt & Co.
- Incorporated: 1904
- Founders: Charles E. Bradt, Samuel E. Bradt, Madison D. Shipman
- Defunct: c. 1970

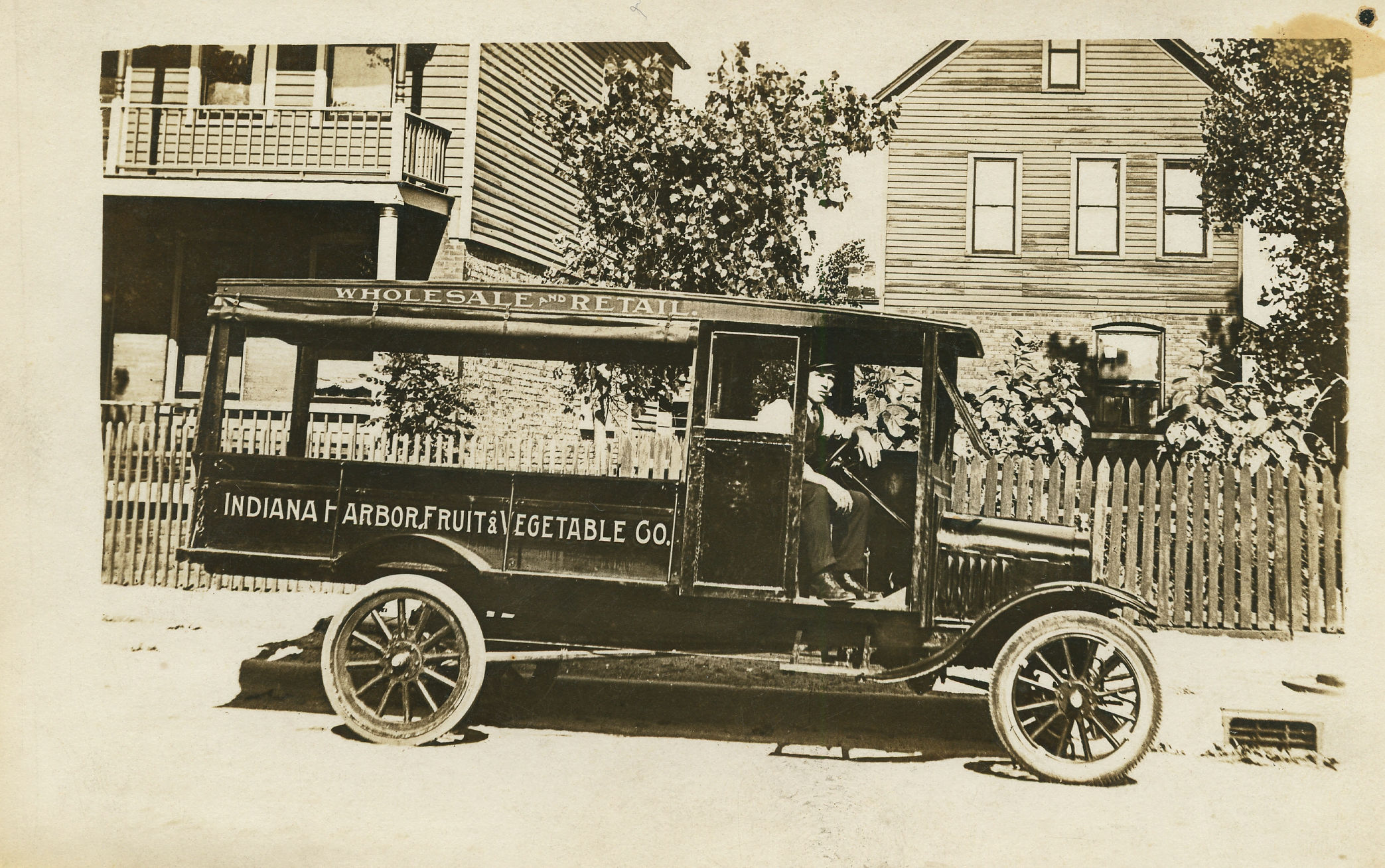
1922 Ford Model T with a DeKalb Commercial Body Co. body

The DeKalb Commercial Body Corporation, formerly known as the Sycamore Wagon Works, DeKalb Wagon Company, and DeKalb Commercial Body Company, is a defunct manufacturer of wagons and vocational truck bodies.

== History ==
=== Pre-truck years ===
The Sycamore Wagon Works was officially founded in 1904 (Note: Bradt and Shipman already had 10 or so years of experience in the wagon industry, but their first real factory and official incorporation papers both came about in 1904 according to this newspaper article) in Sycamore, Illinois by brothers Charles and Samuel Bradt, and partner Madison D. Shipman (Who was Charles and Samuel's brother-in-law) in Sycamore, Illinois. The trio had previously been involved in a glove manufacturing business in Gloversville, New York. Their first products included milk wagons, delivery wagons, and wagons designed specifically for the transport of pianos, likely for the nearby Melville-Clark Piano Company factory. (Note: In 1919 Melville-Clark was bought by Wurlitzer. (source)) The first manager of the company was a Mr. Will Smith, who had experience as the former manager for both the Kalamazoo Wagon Company (Note: Which would later become the Limousine Body Co.) and the Montgomery Ward buggy factory. The company later began to produce the Sycamore One-Step Wagon, with a low floor for easy access. In 1912, Sycamore Wagon Works moved to a former shoe factory in DeKalb and was renamed DeKalb Wagon Company. They continued to produce wagons.

=== Trucks ===
In 1913 the DeKalb Wagon Company purchased the Randolph Motor Car Company from General Motors, who had owned it since 1908 but had discontinued all Randolph models. In 1913, DeKalb officially announced that it would begin production of Randolph trucks, and later that year they were renamed to DeKalb.

As the years progressed, DeKalb ceased to produce wagons or their own vehicles, instead building vocational bodies (i.e. fire trucks, cement mixers, milk trucks, etc.) onto existing truck chassis, especially Dodges.

One of DeKalb Commercial Body Corporation's more famous models was the Lumberjack, a truck that was almost entirely a large, flat surface (broken only by a small, 1-person cab) designed for hauling lumber. Over the years, there were more modifications to the design, such as a larger version and a similar model designed for hauling metal. While DeKalb did not claim to be the only company making bodies in this style, they became very popular in the Midwest.

=== Closing ===
Very little is known about the closing of the DeKalb Commercial Body Corporation. While the company's address was listed in a 1969 city directory, the same address was listed as a vacant lot in 1971. The company appears to have gone out of business sometime around then, although the reason is unknown.
