= DeKalb High School =

DeKalb High School may refer to several schools in the United States:

- DeKalb High School (Illinois), DeKalb, Illinois
- DeKalb High School (Indiana), Waterloo, Indiana
- DeKalb High School (Texas), DeKalb, Texas
- DeKalb County High School, Smithville, Tennessee
- DeKalb School of the Arts, Atlanta, Georgia
- Southwest DeKalb High School, DeKalb County, Georgia
