= Peter Cotton =

19th-century American soldier

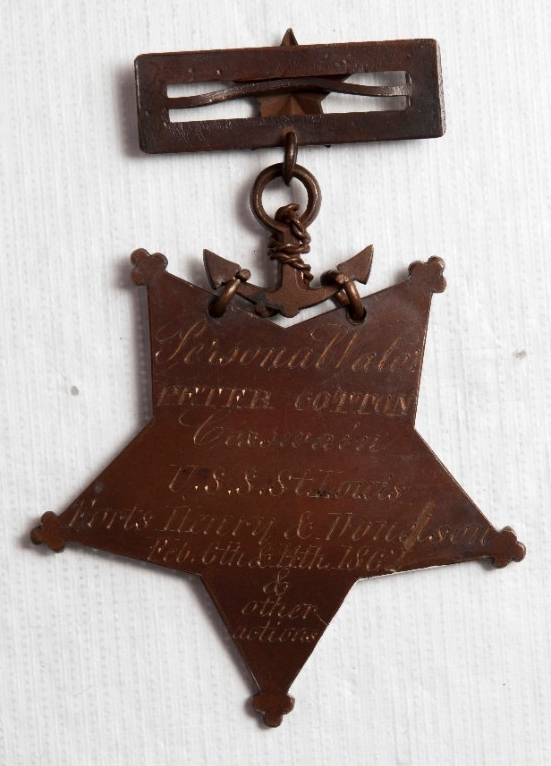
- Cotton's Medal of Honor
- Born: June 17, 1839; New York City, New York, U.S.
- Military career
- Allegiance: United States of America
- Branch: United States Army
- Rank: Ordinary Seaman
- Unit: United States Navy
- Conflicts: American Civil War: Battle of Fort Henry; Battle of Fort Donelson; Yazoo Pass expedition
- Awards: Medal of Honor

Peter Cotton (June 17, 1839 – unknown) was an American sailor who fought in the American Civil War. Cotton received the Medal of Honor, the country's highest award for bravery during combat, for his action aboard the USS Baron DeKalb during the Yazoo Pass expedition between 23 and 27 December 1862. He was honored with the award on 3 April 1863.

== Biography ==
Cotton was born in New York City on June 17, 1839. He enlisted into the United States Navy during the American Civil War. Cotton was the coxswain aboard the USS Baron DeKalb (initially called the USS St. Louis), and saw action at the battles of Fort Henry and Fort Donelson in February 1862.

=== Medal of Honor ===
Citation:

Cotton served on board the U.S.S. Baron De Kalb in the Yazoo River expedition, 23 to 27 December 1862. Proceeding under orders up the Yazoo River, the Baron De Kalb, with the object of capturing or destroying the enemy's transports, came upon the steamers John Walsh, R. J. Locklan, Golden Age, and the Scotland, sunk on a bar where they were ordered to be burned. Continuing up the river, the Baron De Kalb was fired upon but, upon returning the fire, caused the enemy's retreat. Returning down the Yazoo, she destroyed and captured large quantities of enemy equipment and several prisoners. Serving bravely throughout this action, Cotton, as Coxswain, "distinguished himself in the various actions."

== See also ==
- List of American Civil War Medal of Honor recipients: A–F
