= Pierre Leon =

- Born: August 23, 1838; Nice, France
- Died: December 7, 1915 (aged 77); Riverside Township, New Jersey
- Burial place: St Peters Cemetery, Riverside, NJ
- Military career
- Allegiance: United States of America; Union
- Branch: United States Navy; Union Navy
- Service years: 1861 - 1865
- Rank: Captain of the Forecastle
- Unit: (United States Navy) USS Baron DeKalb
- Conflicts: American Civil War
- Awards: Medal of Honor

Pierre Leon (August 23, 1838 – December 7, 1915) was a Captain of the Forecastle in the Union Navy and a Medal of Honor recipient for his actions in the American Civil War.

== Early life and military service ==
Leon was born in Nice on 23 August 1838. At age eleven, he stowed away on a ship bound to Philadelphia. He served on several coastal steamers until 1860, when he became involved in the development of the Alligator, an experimental submarine.

Leon joined the US Navy from Philadelphia in August 1861. He served on no less than 8 different ships, including the USS Baron De Kalb, before his discharge exactly four years later.

== Medal of Honor citation ==
Rank and organization: Captain of the Forecastle, U.S. Navy. Born: 1837, Nice, France. Accredited to: Pennsylvania. G.O. No.: 11, April 3, 1863.

Citation:

Serving on board the U.S.S. Baron De Kalb, Yazoo River Expedition, 23 to 27 December 1862. Proceeding under orders up the Yazoo River, the U.S.S. Baron De Kalb, with the object of capturing or destroying the enemy's transports, came upon the steamers John Walsh, R. J. Locklan, Golden Age and the Scotland sunk on a bar where they were ordered fired. Continuing up the river, she was fired on, but upon returning the fire, caused the enemy's retreat. Returning down the Yazoo, she destroyed and captured larger quantities of enemy equipment and several prisoners. Serving bravely throughout this action, Leon, as captain of the forecastle, "distinguished himself in the various actions".

== See also ==
- List of American Civil War Medal of Honor recipients: G–L
