= USS Baron DeKalb =

Civil War gunboat of the United States Navy

Coordinates: 32.823470°N 90.454706°W

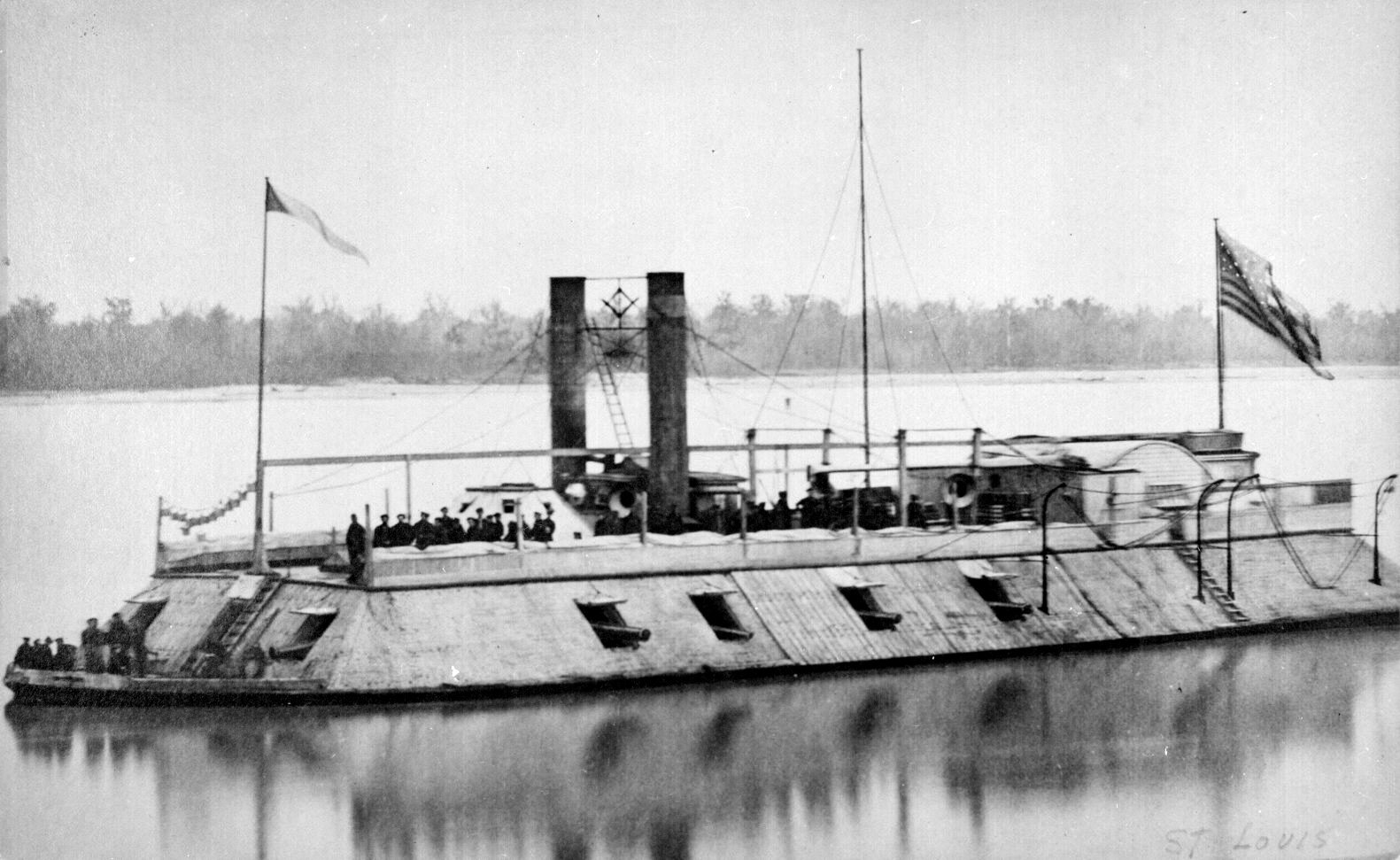
- USS Baron DeKalb

History

United States
- Ordered: as St. Louis
- Builder: James B. Eads Yard, St. Louis, Missouri
- Cost: $89,000 USD
- Laid down: August 1861
- Launched: October 12, 1861 at Carondelet, Missouri
- Commissioned: January 31, 1862
- Renamed: September 8, 1862 as Baron DeKalb
- Stricken: July 13, 1863
- Identification: Yellow band on stacks
- Fate: Sunk by mine, July 13, 1863

General characteristics
- Class & type: City-class river casemate ironclad
- Displacement: 512 tons
- Length: 175 ft (53 m)
- Beam: 51 ft 2 in (15.60 m)
- Draught: 6 ft (1.8 m)
- Propulsion: steam engine - Center Wheel, 2 horizontal HP engines (22" X 6"), 5 boilers
- Speed: 9 mph (14 km/h)
- Complement: 251 officers and enlisted
- Armament: (see section below)
- Armour: 2.5 in (64 mm) on the casemates, 1.25 in (32 mm) on the pilothouse

USS Baron DeKalb was a City-class ironclad gunboat constructed for the Union Navy by James B. Eads during the American Civil War.

USS Baron DeKalb, named after General Baron DeKalb of Hüttendorf near Erlangen, in present-day Bavaria, was originally named Saint Louis, and was one of seven City-class ironclads built at Carondelet, Missouri and Mound City, Illinois, for the Western Gunboat Flotilla.

These ironclads were shallow draft with a center driven paddle wheel. They were partially armored and slow and very hard to steer in the currents of rivers. They were vulnerable to plunging fire and also by hits in their un-armored areas. Called "Pook Turtles" for the designer, they played an essential role through four years of war and were present at almost every battle on the Mississippi River and its tributaries.

== Built in St. Louis, Missouri in 1861 ==
Originally built as St. Louis, the stern wheel casemate gunboat was built by James B. Eads, at the Union Marine Works at Carondelet, Missouri, for the U.S. War Department. She was launched in St. Louis, Missouri, October 12, 1861 and joined the Western Gunboat Flotilla.

== Civil War service ==
=== Assigned to Union Army operations ===
During 1862 St. Louis, under the command of Lieutenant L. Paulding USN, was attached to Rear Admiral Andrew Hull Foote's squadron and participated in the Battle of Lucas Bend and the capture of Fort Henry on the Tennessee River (February 6, 1862). She served as flagship for the squadron when it assisted the Union Army at the capture of Fort Donelson on the Cumberland River (February 14–16, 1862). Between April and June 1862, she operated against Fort Pillow, Tennessee.

St. Louis was renamed Baron De Kalb for the Revolutionary War general Johann de Kalb on September 8, 1862. This change was apparently in anticipation of the vessel's transfer from the War Department to the Navy Department, there already being a St. Louis in commission with the Navy.

=== Reassigned to the Union Navy ===
On October 1, 1862 Baron De Kalb was transferred to the Navy Department. During December 21–28 she took part in the Yazoo Expedition and participated in the action at Drumgould's Bluff (December 28). Four of Baron De Kalb's sailors were awarded the Medal of Honor for their actions in the expedition: Ordinary Seaman Peter Cotton, Captain of the Forecastle Pierre Leon, Boatswain's Mate John McDonald, and Boatswain's Mate Charles Robinson.

During 1863 Baron De Kalb took part in the capture of Arkansas Post (January 10–11); expedition up the White River (January 12–14); Yazoo Pass Expedition (February 20 – April 5); action at Fort Pemberton (March 11–13); action at Haines' Bluff (April 29–2 May, May 18); action at Yazoo City, Mississippi (20–23 May); and the Yazoo River Expedition (24–31 May).

=== Sunk by mine ===
On July 13, 1863 Baron De Kalb was sunk by a mine (then called a "torpedo") in the Yazoo River, one mile below Yazoo City, Mississippi.

== Chronology ==
- January 11, 1862 against CSN vessels near Lucas Bend, Missouri.
- February 6, 1862 attacking Battle of Fort Henry, Tennessee.
- February 14, 1862 attacking Fort Donelson, Tennessee. (Hit 59 times with severe damage).
- Repaired at St. Louis.
- February 23, 1862 attacked Columbus, Kentucky, a demonstration during Battle of Belmont.
- March 15 through April 7, 1862, Battle of Island Number 10.
- April 13, 1862, attacked Fort Pillow
- May 10, 1862, involved in the Fort Pillow.
- June 6, 1862, First Battle of Memphis destroying the Confederate Mississippi river fleet with her sister ships and several "Ellet Rams"
- June 17, 1862, participated in the expedition up the White River (Arkansas) bombarding positions at St. Charles, Arkansas.
- September 8, 1862, rechristened USS Baron De Kalb.
- November 21 through December 11, 1862; Expedition up the Yazoo River.
- December 5, 1862, captured the steamer Lottie.
- December 28, 1862, bombarded the batteries at Drumgold's Bluff.
- January 10–11, 1863, took part in the Battle of Fort Hindman, Arkansas
- March 11–23, 1863, took part in the Battle of Fort Pemberton, Tallahatchie River
- May 18, 1863, took part in capture of Battle of Haynes Bluff.
- May 19, 1863, captured the steamer Alonzo Child.
- May 20–23, 1863, helped destroy the Yazoo City Navy Yard.
- May 24–31, 1863, made an expedition up the Yazoo River.
- July 13, 1863, sunk by a torpedo one mile below Yazoo City.

== Armament ==
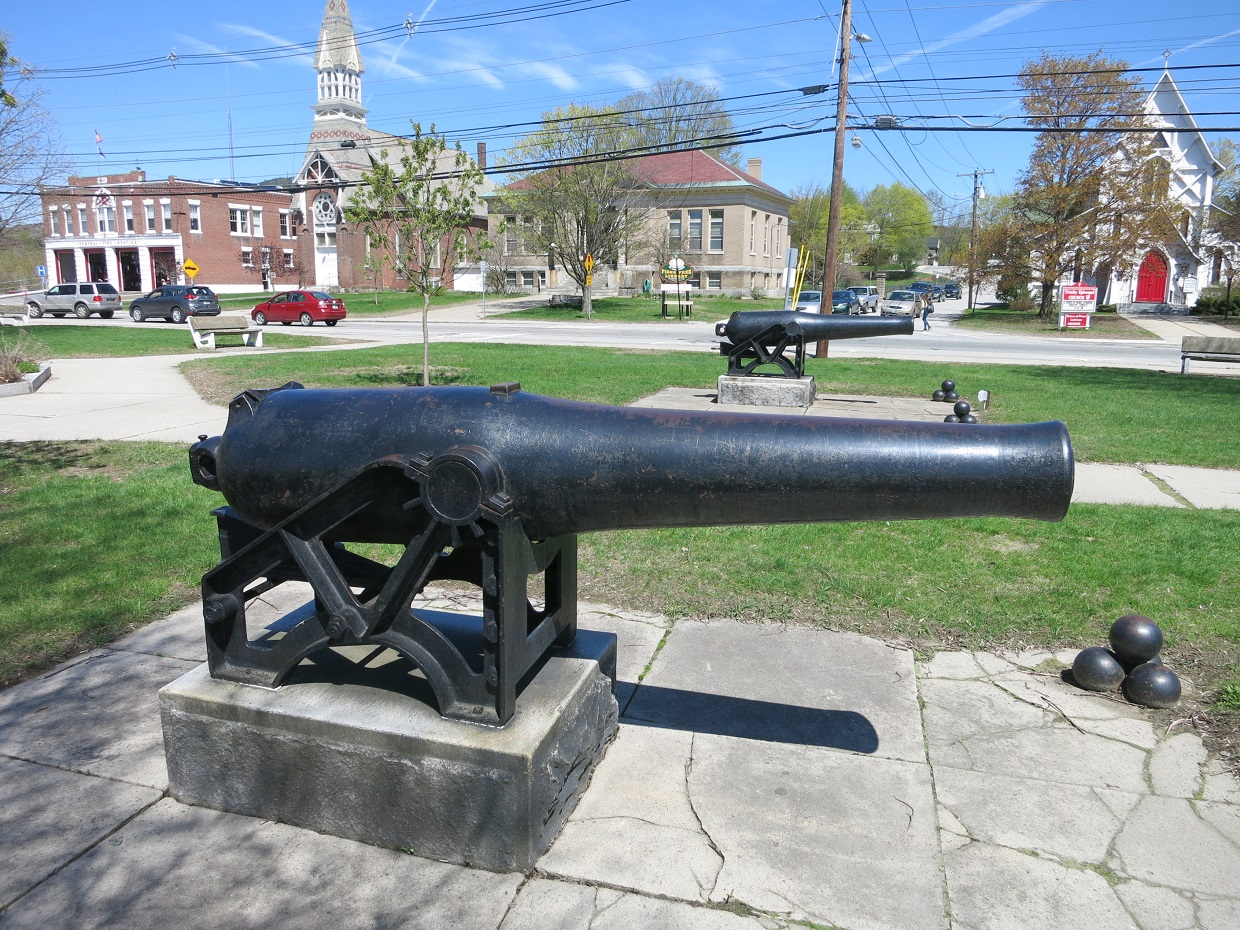
32-pounder (6.5-inch) Dahlgren naval guns

Like many of the Mississippi theater ironclads, Baron Dekalb had its armament changed multiple times over life of the vessel. To expedite the entrance of Baron DeKalb into service, she and the other City-class ships were fitted with whatever weapons were available; then had their weapons upgraded as new pieces became available. Though the 8 in (200 mm) Dahlgren smoothbore cannons were fairly modern most of the other original armaments were antiquated; such as the 32-pounders, or modified; such as the 42-pounder "rifles" which were in fact, old smoothbores that had been gouged out to give them rifling. These 42-pounder weapons were of particular concern to military commanders because they were structurally weaker and more prone to exploding than purpose-built rifled cannons. Additionally, the close confines of riverine combat greatly increased the threat of boarding parties. The 12-pounder howitzer was equipped to address that concern and was not used in regular combat.

Ordnance characteristics
January 1862	October 1862	December 1862	Early 1863
• 3 × 8-inch smoothbores • 4 × 42-pounder rifles • 6 × 32-pounder rifles • 1 × 12-pounder rifle	• 3 × 8-inch smoothbores • 2 × 42-pounder rifles • 6 × 32-pounder rifles • 2 × 30-pounder rifles • 1 × 12-pounder rifle	• 2 × 10-inch smoothbores • 3 × 8-inch smoothbores • 2 × 42-pounder rifles • 6 × 32-pounder rifles • 2 × 30-pounder rifles • 1 × 12-pounder rifle	• 1 × 10-inch smoothbore • 2 × 9-inch smoothbores • 2 × 8-inch smoothbores • 6 × 32-pounder rifles • 2 × 30-pounder rifles • 1 × 12-pounder rifle

== See also ==
- Union Navy
- Anaconda Plan
- Mississippi Squadron
