= Johann de Kalb =

German-born army officer (1721–1780)

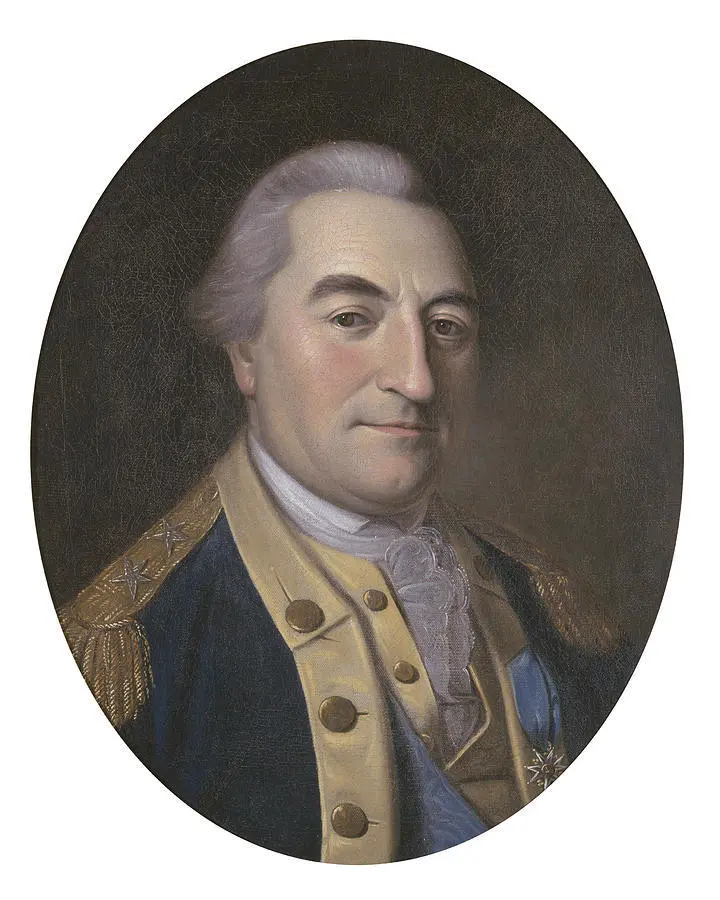
- Portrait by Charles Willson Peale, 1782
- Born: June 19, 1721; Hüttendorf, Brandenburg-Bayreuth, Holy Roman Empire (Note: (now Erlangen-Hüttendorf, Franconia, Germany))
- Died: August 19, 1780 (aged 59); Camden, South Carolina, U.S.
- Burial place: Bethesda Presbyterian Churchyard; Camden, South Carolina, U.S.
- Spouse: Anna Elizabeth Emilie van Robais
- Military career
- Allegiance: France; United States
- Branch: Royal French Army; Continental Army
- Service years: 1743–1764; 1777–1780
- Rank: Major-general
- Conflicts: War of Austrian Succession; Seven Years' War; American Revolutionary War; Valley Forge; Battle of Camden †

Signature
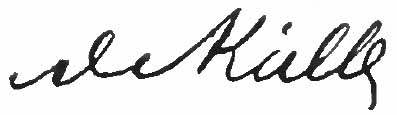

Johann von Robais, Baron de Kalb (June 19, 1721 – August 19, 1780), born Johann Kalb, was a German-born army officer who served in the French and Continental armies. During the American Revolutionary War, he served as a major general in the Continental Army and was mortally wounded at the 1780 Battle of Camden, dying several days later.

== Early life and education ==
De Kalb was born in Hüttendorf, a German village near Erlangen, Principality of Bayreuth, the son of Johann Leonhard Kalb and Margarethe Seitz. From a peasant family, he worked as a waiter until he left home at the age of sixteen. He learned French, English, and the social skills to earn a substantial military commission in the Loewendal German Regiment of the French Army in 1743.

== Career ==
De Kalb served with distinction in the War of the Austrian Succession in Flanders. During the Seven Years' War, he was promoted to lieutenant colonel and made assistant quartermaster general in the Army of the Upper Rhine, a division created by the disbanding of the Loewendal Regiment. He was awarded the Order of Military Merit in 1763 and elevated to the nobility with the title of baron.

In 1764, de Kalb resigned from the army and married Anna Elizabeth Emilie van Robais (*1748, +1785), the French heiress to a fortune from cloth manufacturing. He bought the Milon-la-Chapelle chateau near Versailles, where he took up a quiet life of farming. He had three children: Élie, Frederic, and Caroline. (Élie later married Elise Signard d'Ouffières and had a daughter, Nicette de Kalb, who married Raymond de Vandière de Vitrac d'Abzac, and continued to live in Milon-la-Chapelle; Frederic would die during the French Revolution without children.)

In 1768, de Kalb traveled to North America on a covert mission from the Duc de Choiseul, the Foreign Minister of France, to determine the level of discontent among colonists towards Great Britain, a major French adversary. During his four-month trip, de Kalb gained respect for the colonists and their "spirit of independence", producing detailed reports for the French government; upon his return to Europe, he expressed a strong desire to go back to colonial America and join their nascent fight against the British.

=== American Revolutionary War ===
In July 1777, de Kalb returned to North America with his protégé, the Marquis de Lafayette, to join the Continental Army. Before sailing from France, he had been promised commission as a major general; he was now disappointed and angry to learn that the Continental Congress was not inclined to honor this promise, but with Lafayette's influence he was appointed to the rank on September 5, 1777, which he learned of on the road to return to France.

De Kalb was at Valley Forge for most of the winter of 1777–1778, commanding a division of Patterson's and Learned's Brigades. He also wrote letters of introduction for John Adams to the French court.

In a January 1778 letter to his wife, de Kalb expressed a poor opinion of the French forces:

On the whole, I have annoyances to bear, of which you can hardly form a conception. One of them is the mutual jealousy of almost all the French officers, particularly against those of higher rank than the rest. These people think of nothing but their incessant intrigues and backbitings. They hate each other like the bitterest enemies, and endeavor to injure each other wherever an opportunity offers. I have given up their society, and very seldom see them. La Fayette is the sole exception; I always meet him with the same cordiality and the same pleasure. He is an excellent young man, and we are good friends ... La Fayette is much liked, he is on the best of terms with Washington.

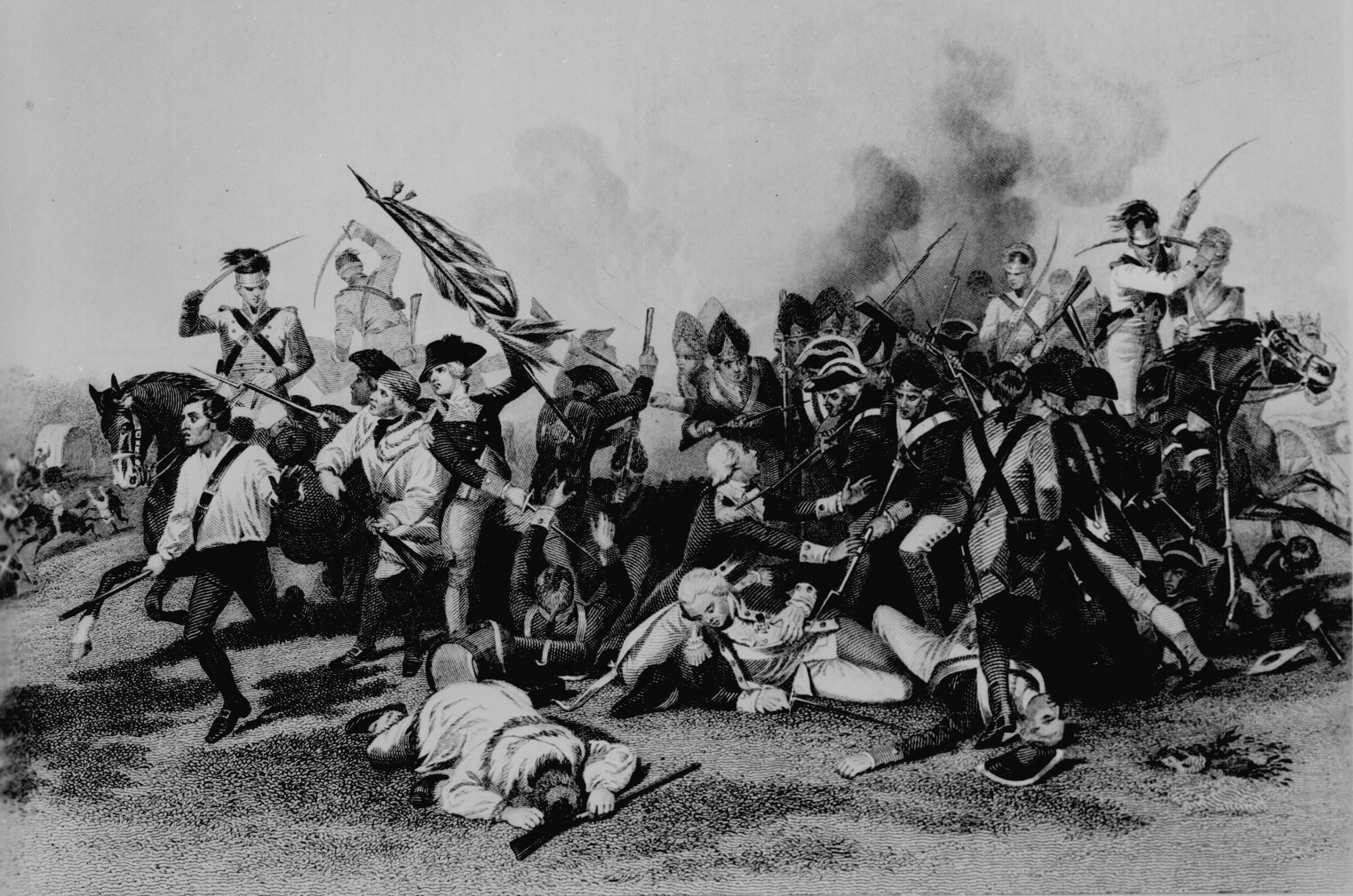
An engraving showing the wounding of Baron de Kalb

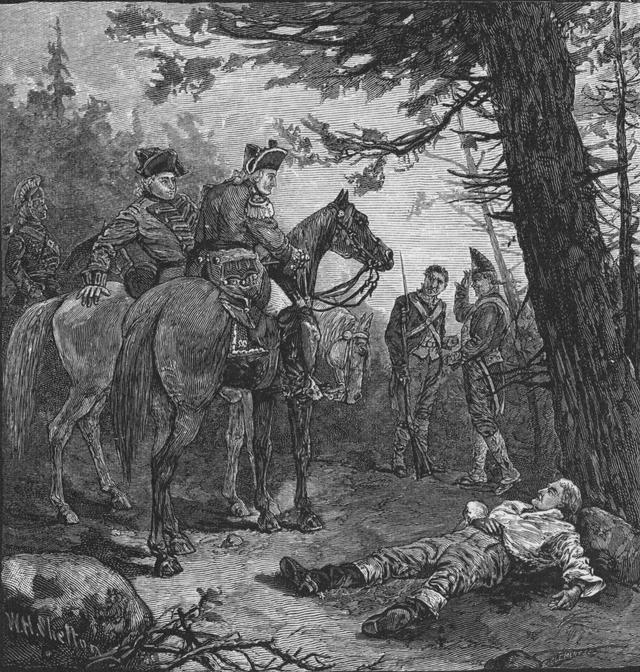
An engraving showing the wounded Baron de Kalb

De Kalb was assigned to command a division of Maryland and Delaware troops, and he was ordered south to the Carolinas in command of these reinforcements. During the British southern campaign, he was disappointed to learn that Horatio Gates had been appointed to command instead of him. Gates led the army to a disastrous defeat at the Battle of Camden on August 16, 1780. De Kalb's horse was shot from under him, causing him to tumble to the ground. He continued fighting on foot while directing and rallying his troops. In the course of the battle, he was shot three times and bayonetted repeatedly. After de Kalb collapsed from his wounds, his aide, the Chevalier du Buysson, blocked additional blows with his own body while calling out de Kalb's identity to the British.

Upon seeing de Kalb, British General Charles Cornwallis told him, "I am sorry, sir, to see you, not sorry that you are vanquished, but sorry to see you so badly wounded." It is reported that Cornwallis supervised the dressing of de Kalb's wounds by his own surgeons in Camden, South Carolina. As he lay dying, de Kalb was reported to have said to a British officer, "I thank you, sir, for your generous sympathy; but I die the death I always prayed for; the death of a soldier, fighting for the rights of man." He died three days later.

Upon visiting de Kalb's grave several years after his death, George Washington is reported to have said:

So; there lies the brave de Kalb; the generous stranger; who came from a distant land to fight our battles; and to water with his blood the tree of liberty. Would to God he had lived to share its fruits!

== Legacy ==
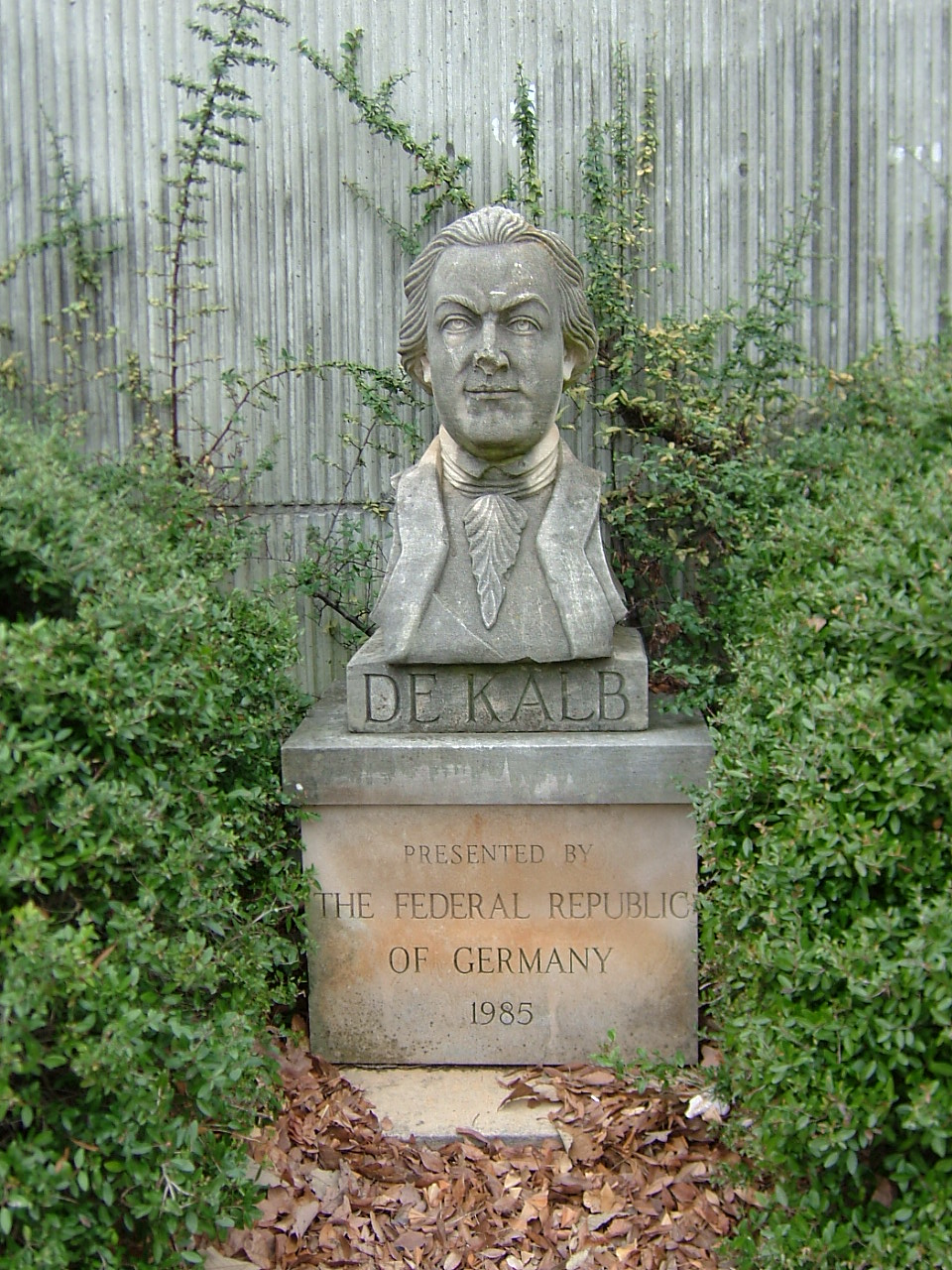
DeKalb bust in Decatur, Georgia

De Kalb was greatly revered by his contemporaries and is still regarded as a hero of the American Revolution. Numerous towns and counties in the U.S. bear his name, including in Alabama, Georgia, Illinois, Indiana, Mississippi, Missouri, New York, Tennessee and Texas. Streets include DeKalb Avenue in Brooklyn, New York City, Bridgeport, Connecticut and Merrick, New York, DeKalb Pike (U.S. Route 202) between King of Prussia and Montgomeryville, Pennsylvania, DeKalb Street in Camden, South Carolina, and others.

In Brooklyn, New York, the Knights of Columbus established the Baron DeKalb Council #1073 in 1906. His portrait was painted posthumously by Charles Willson Peale. In 1886, a monument to de Kalb was erected on the grounds of the Maryland State House to honor his contributions to the American Revolution.

Two warships of the U.S. Navy were named after him: the Civil War river ironclad USS Baron DeKalb and the World War I troop transport USS DeKalb.

An American elementary school run by the U.S. Department of Defense in Nuremberg, Germany, was named for him; it closed in the 1990s. Since 2006, the Major General Baron DeKalb Army Reserve Center has hosted the headquarters of the 200th Military Police Command at Fort Meade, Maryland.

In Camden, South Carolina, outside the Revolutionary War Visitor Center, a statue of de Kalb commemorates his bravery in the Battle of Camden.
