= USS DeKalb County =

1944 LST-542-class tank landing ship

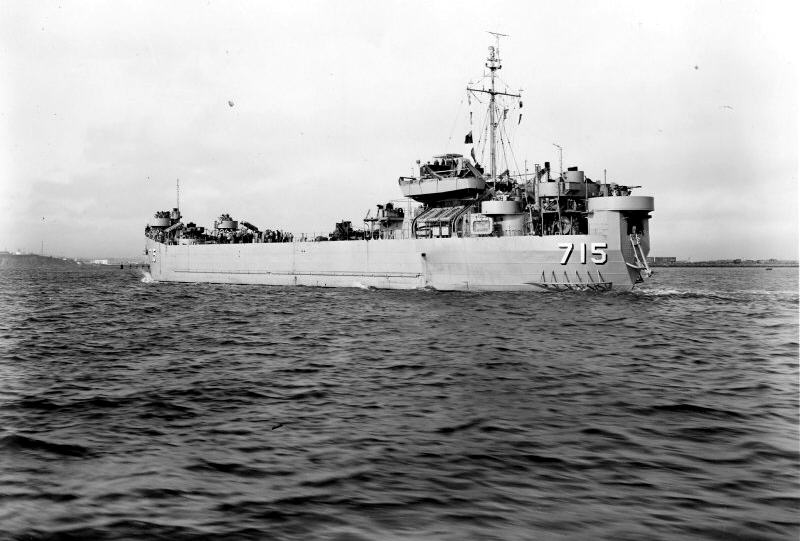
- Aft quarter view of USS DeKalb County (LST-715) off Mare Island Naval Shipyard, 9 August 1951

History

United States
- Name: USS LST-715
- Builder: Jeffersonville Boat & Machine Company, Jeffersonville, Indiana
- Laid down: 7 June 1944
- Launched: 20 July 1944
- Commissioned: 15 August 1944
- Decommissioned: 17 April 1946
- Stricken: 29 September 1947
- Honours and awards: 2 battle stars (World War II)
- Fate: Transferred to the US Army Transportation Corps, 28 June 1946
- Name: USAT LST-715
- Acquired: 28 June 1946
- Commissioned: 29 June 1946
- Reinstated: to Navy List, 10 August 1950
- Fate: Returned to the US Navy, 25 July 1950
- Name: USS LST-715
- Recommissioned: 30 August 1950
- Renamed: USS DeKalb County (LST-715), 1 July 1955
- Honours and awards: 6 battle stars (Korea)
- Fate: Transferred to Military Sea Transportation Service, December 1965
- Name: USNS DeKalb County (T-LST-715)
- In service: December 1965
- Out of service: 1 November 1973
- Stricken: 1 November 1973
- Fate: Sold for scrapping, 30 April 1984

General characteristics
- Class & type: LST-542-class tank landing ship
- Displacement: 1,625 long tons (1,651 t) light; 3,640 long tons (3,698 t) full
- Length: 328 ft (100 m)
- Beam: 50 ft (15 m)
- Draft: Unloaded : 2 ft 4 in (0.71 m) forward; 7 ft 6 in (2.29 m) aft; Loaded : 8 ft 2 in (2.49 m) forward; 14 ft 1 in (4.29 m) aft
- Propulsion: 2 × General Motors 12-567 diesel engines, two shafts, twin rudders
- Speed: 12 knots (22 km/h; 14 mph)
- Boats & landing craft carried: 2 LCVPs
- Troops: Approximately 130 officers and enlisted men
- Complement: 8–10, 89–100 men
- Armament: 8 × 40 mm guns; 12 × 20 mm guns

USS DeKalb County (LST-715) was an LST-542-class tank landing ship built for the United States Navy during World War II. Named after counties in six states, it was the only U.S. Naval vessel to bear the name.

LST-715 was laid down on 7 June 1944 at Jeffersonville, Indiana by the Jeffersonville Boat & Machine Company; launched on 20 July 1944; sponsored by Mrs. Loudie S. Moffatt; and commissioned on 15 August 1944.

Jack Greenberg (1924–2016), who was later to become the primary lawyer of the American civil rights movement, served as a lieutenant junior grade (USN) on the DeKalb County, fighting at both Iwo Jima and Okinawa.

== Service history ==
=== World War II ===
During World War II, LST-715 was assigned to the Asiatic-Pacific theater and participated in the following operations: assault and occupation of Iwo Jima (February and March, 1945) and the assault and occupation of Okinawa Gunto (May and June, 1945). Following the war, LST-715 performed occupation duty in the Far East until mid-September 1945. LST-715 was decommissioned on 17 April 1946 at Manicani Island, Republic of the Philippines.

=== United States Army ===
The ship was transferred to the United States Army Transportation Corps on 28 June 1946. Commissioned USAT LST-715 on 29 June 1946, the ship was struck from the Naval Vessel Register on 29 September 1947.

=== Korean War ===
Reacquired by the Navy on 25 July 1950, the ship was reinstated to the Naval Register on 10 August 1950. Recommissioned USS LST-715 on 30 August 1950, it participated in the following Korean War campaigns: North Korean Aggression (18 September to 2 November 1950), Communist China Aggression (3 November 1950 to 14 January 1951), Inchon Landing (13 to 17 September 1950), UN Counter Offensive (1 to 14 March 1951), Second Korean Winter (11 January to 30 April 1952), and Korean Defense Summer-Fall 1952 (1 May to 6 August 1952). LST-715 was redesignated USS DeKalb County (LST-715) on 1 July 1955.

=== Military Sea Transportation Service ===
It was transferred to the Military Sea Transportation Service (MSTS) in December 1965 where it served as USNS DeKalb County (T-LST-715). Placed out of service and again struck from the Naval Register on 1 November 1973, custody was transferred to the United States Maritime Administration (MARAD) for lay up in the National Defense Reserve Fleet at Suisun Bay, California. The ship was disposed of by MARAD on 30 April 1984 to Jon M. Associates, Suisun Bay, Benicia, California for scrapping.

LST-715 earned two battle stars for World War II service, and six battle stars during the Korean War.
