= USS LST-926 =

LST-542-class tank landing ship

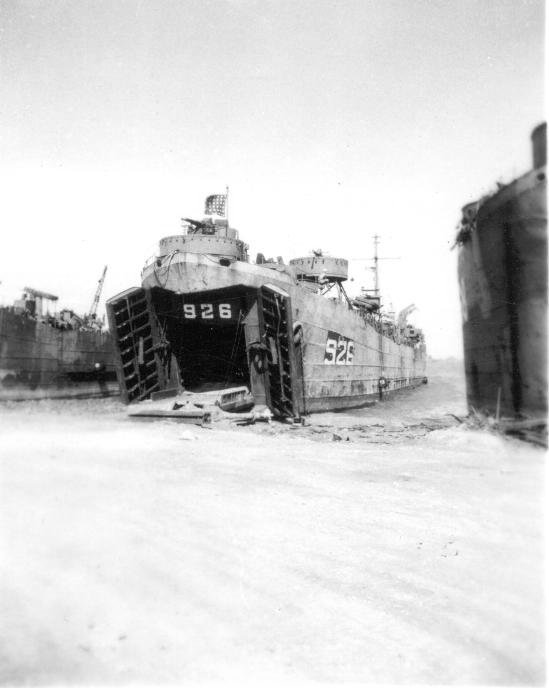
- USS LST-926 center, USS LST-598 at left, and USS LST-826 at right beached, in the South Pacific, circa 1944-45.

History

United States
- Name: LST-926
- Builder: Bethlehem-Hingham Shipyard, Hingham, Massachusetts
- Yard number: 3396
- Laid down: 13 May 1944
- Launched: 24 June 1944
- Commissioned: 20 July 1944
- Decommissioned: 14 June 1946
- Stricken: 31 July 1946
- Identification: Hull symbol: LST-926; Code letters: NVOY
- Honors and awards: 2 × battle star
- Fate: Sold for scrapping, 13 June 1948

General characteristics
- Class & type: LST-542-class tank landing ship
- Displacement: 1,625 long tons (1,651 t) (light); 4,080 long tons (4,145 t) (full (seagoing draft with 1,675 short tons (1,520 t) load); 2,366 long tons (2,404 t) (beaching)
- Length: 328 ft (100 m) oa
- Beam: 50 ft (15 m)
- Draft: Unloaded: 2 ft 4 in (0.71 m) forward; 7 ft 6 in (2.29 m) aft; Full load: 8 ft 3 in (2.51 m) forward; 14 ft 1 in (4.29 m) aft; Landing with 500 short tons (450 t) load: 3 ft 11 in (1.19 m) forward; 9 ft 10 in (3.00 m) aft; Limiting 11 ft 2 in (3.40 m); Maximum navigation 14 ft 1 in (4.29 m)
- Installed power: 2 × 900 hp (670 kW) Electro-Motive Diesel 12-567A diesel engines; 1,800 shp (1,300 kW)
- Propulsion: 1 × Falk main reduction gears; 2 × Propellers
- Speed: 11.6 kn (21.5 km/h; 13.3 mph)
- Range: 24,000 nmi (44,000 km; 28,000 mi) at 9 kn (17 km/h; 10 mph) while displacing 3,960 long tons (4,024 t)
- Boats & landing craft carried: 2 x LCVPs
- Capacity: 1,600–1,900 short tons (3,200,000–3,800,000 lb; 1,500,000–1,700,000 kg) cargo depending on mission
- Troops: 16 officers, 147 enlisted men
- Complement: 13 officers, 104 enlisted men
- Armament: Varied, ultimate armament; 2 × twin 40 mm (1.57 in) Bofors guns; 4 × single 40 mm Bofors guns; 12 × 20 mm (0.79 in) Oerlikon cannons

Service record
- Part of: LST Flotilla 6
- Operations: Lingayen Gulf landings (9 January 1945); Assault and occupation of Okinawa Gunto (1 April–30 June 1945)
- Awards: American Campaign Medal; Asiatic–Pacific Campaign Medal; World War II Victory Medal; Navy Occupation Service Medal w/Asia Clasp; Philippine Republic Presidential Unit Citation; Philippine Liberation Medal

USS LST-926 was an LST-542-class tank landing ship in the United States Navy. Like many of her class, she was not named and is properly referred to by her hull designation.

== Construction ==
LST-926 was laid down on 13 May 1944, at Hingham, Massachusetts, by the Bethlehem-Hingham Shipyard; launched on 24 June 1944; and commissioned on 20 July 1944.

== Service history ==
During World War II, LST-926 was assigned to the Asiatic-Pacific theater. She took part in the Lingayen Gulf landings in January 1945, and the assault and occupation of Okinawa Gunto in April and June 1945.

The morning after the Japanese surrender on 15 August, the ship's crewmen found the cockpit of a Yokosuka D4Y aircraft that had launched an unsuccessful kamikaze attack. It is speculated that Japanese Admiral Matome Ugaki was one of the three bodies inside. All three were buried on a nearby beach.

After the war, she performed occupation duty in the Far East until late March 1946. The ship was decommissioned on 14 June 1946, and struck from the Navy list on 31 July, that same year. On 13 June 1948, the tank landing ship was sold to the Walter W. Johnson Co., for scrapping.

== Awards ==
LST-926 earned two battle star for World War II service.

== Bibliography ==
- "LST-926". Dictionary of American Naval Fighting Ships. Naval History and Heritage Command. This article incorporates text from this source, which is in the public domain.
- "Bethlehem-Hingham, Hingham MA". www.ShipbuildingHistory.com. 11 August 2011.
- "USS LST-926". NavSource. 6 November 2015.
- "D4Y Judy Manufacture Number ???? Tail Code 701-122". Pacific Wrecks. 14 February 2020.
