= USS Hampshire County =

1944 LST-542-class tank landing ship

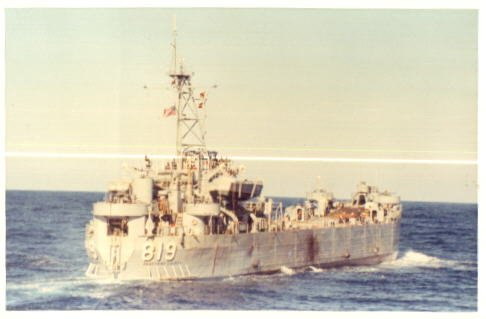
- USS Hampshire County (LST-819)

History

United States
- Name: USS Hampshire County (LST-819)
- Namesake: Hampshire County, Massachusetts; Hampshire County, West Virginia
- Builder: Missouri Valley Bridge & Iron Company, Evansville, Indiana
- Laid down: 12 September 1944
- Launched: 21 October 1944
- Commissioned: 7 November 1944
- Decommissioned: January 1946
- Recommissioned: 8 September 1950
- Decommissioned: 24 June 1955
- Renamed: USS Hampshire County (LST-819), 1 July 1955
- Recommissioned: 9 July 1966
- Decommissioned: 19 December 1970
- Stricken: 5 April 1975
- Motto: Possumus Quae Debmus
- Honors and awards: 1 battle star (World War II); 4 battle stars (Korea); 10 campaign stars, Presidential Unit Citation, and Navy Unit Commendation (Vietnam)
- Fate: Converted for commercial use and sold, 5 April 1975
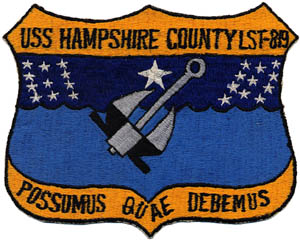
- Badge

Singapore
- Name: LST 2
- Owner: Landing System Technology Pte. Ltd., Singapore
- Acquired: 5 April 1975
- In service: 1975
- Out of service: 1978
- Fate: Sold, 1978

United States Greece
- Name: Petrola 142
- Owner: Maritime & Commercial Co. Argonaftis, S.A., Greece
- Acquired: 1978
- In service: 1980
- Out of service: 1983
- Identification: IMO number: 7629881
- Fate: Scrapped, 1995

General characteristics
- Class & type: LST-542-class tank landing ship
- Displacement: 1,625 long tons (1,651 t) light; 4,080 long tons (4,145 t) full
- Length: 328 ft (100 m)
- Beam: 50 ft (15 m)
- Draft: Unloaded : 2 ft 4 in (0.71 m) forward; 7 ft 6 in (2.29 m) aft; Loaded : 8 ft 2 in (2.49 m) forward; 14 ft 1 in (4.29 m) aft
- Propulsion: 2 × General Motors 12-567 diesel engines, two shafts, twin rudders
- Speed: 12 knots (22 km/h; 14 mph)
- Boats & landing craft carried: Two or six LCVPs
- Complement: 7 officers, 104 enlisted men
- Armament: 8 × 40 mm guns; 12 × 20 mm guns

USS Hampshire County (LST-819) was an LST-542-class tank landing ship built for the United States Navy during World War II. Named for counties in Massachusetts and West Virginia, she was the only U.S. Naval vessel to bear the name.

Originally laid down as LST-819 by the Missouri Valley Bridge & Iron Company of Evansville, Indiana on 12 September 1944; launched on 21 October; sponsored by Mrs. William M. Gilmore; and commissioned on 14 November 1944.

== World War II ==
Following shakedown off Florida, LST-819 loaded cargo, then departed New Orleans on 18 December for the Pacific. After brief stops at San Diego and Pearl Harbor, the tank landing ship arrived at Tulagi on 23 February 1945. During the next month she shuttled cargo throughout the Pacific, then ammunition for the Okinawa invasion. Arriving on 2 April, one day after the initial landing, LST-819 prepared to unload her cargo under heavy enemy air attack. Remaining off the island for the next three weeks, she assisted in the effort as the Japanese made an attempt to stop the American thrust toward Japan. For the rest of the war, she continued transport and cargo operations in the vicinity of Okinawa. After V-J Day, she operated with the occupation forces in Okinawa and Japan, then sailed for the United States in mid-November, arriving San Francisco on 6 January 1946. Later that month she sailed to Astoria, Oregon, was decommissioned there and joined the Pacific Reserve Fleet.

LST-819 received one battle star for World War II service.

== Korean War ==
During the Korean War build-up LST-819 recommissioned at Astoria on 8 September 1950. Following training she departed San Diego three months later, arriving at Yokosuka on 17 January 1951. Two weeks later she steamed to Pusan where she embarked Army personnel for transport to Inchon, arriving there on 19 February. From February to June LST-819 carried troops and vehicles from Japan to Korean ports, then on 8 June departed for the United States. After six months at San Diego LST-819 returned for her second tour in the Far East, arriving at Yokosuka on 15 February 1952. She resumed cargo runs to the war zone and harbor entrance patrol until late October when she steamed back to the United States.

After the Korean War LST-819 made another cruise to the Far East from August 1953 to June 1954 where she resumed her cargo operations under more peaceful conditions. She returned to San Diego on 17 July and operated along the West Coast until she decommissioned on 24 June 1955. While in reserve at San Diego LST-819 was renamed USS Hampshire County (LST-819) on 1 July 1955.

LST-819 received four battle stars for Korean War service.

== Vietnam War ==
Hampshire County was recommissioned at Tod Shipyard in San Padro, CA, in 1966, for service in the Vietnam War. By 9 September she had completed shakedown training and on 24 September left Del Mar, California for Da Nang, South Vietnam, arriving on 8 November. After debarking marines and cargo there, she returned to Guam, anchoring on 19 December. Hampshire County then participated in "Operation Market Time." After that she continued into 1967 in her important combat support missions.

On one mission, returning to Guam from Viet Nam, the ship encountered a hurricane. The crew found a crack forming amidship, growing in size and threatening the ship's survival. The crew performed Damage Repair by welding I-beams and other iron to the deck to prevent the crack from widening, potentially allowing the ship to break in two. The ship continued to Guam after the encounter, going into drydock for repairs (first hand account of electrician's mate aboard in the storm). Rumors floated that had the repairs not been completed, the ship would have sunken with all hands.

Hampshire County received the Combat Action Ribbon, Presidential Unit Citation, Navy Unit Commendation, RVN Gallantry Cross with Palm, RVN Civil Action Medal First Class with Palm, RVN Campaign Medal with 60's device, and the Vietnam Service Medal with 10 battle stars. The Hampshire County was awarded 10 battle stars during her Vietnam deployment.

== Decommissioning and sale ==
Decommissioned on 19 December 1970, Hampshire County was struck from the Naval Vessel Register on 1 April 1975. Sold by the Defense Reutilization and Marketing Service in 1975 she was converted for commercial use, acquired by Landing System Technology Pte. Ltd., of Singapore and renamed LST 2. The ship was then acquired by Maritime & Commercial Co. Argonaftis S.A. of Greece on 30 June 1978, and renamed Petrola 142. Laid up on 24 February 1983, the ship was eventually sold. She arrived at Aliağa, Turkey, for scrapping on 22 December 1995.
