= Švehla =

Švehla is a Czech and Slovak surname. People with the name include:

- Antonín Švehla (1873–1933), three-time prime minister of Czechoslovakia and agrarian politician
- Henry Svehla (c. 1932–1952), Medal of Honor recipient
- Róbert Švehla (1969–), Slovak-born American professional ice hockey player
- Petr Švehla (1972–), Czech amateur Greco-Roman wrestler
