= John Galloway (Medal of Honor) =

- Born: c. 1843; Philadelphia, Pennsylvania, U.S.
- Died: May 23, 1904; Philadelphia, Pennsylvania, U.S.
- Burial place: Mount Moriah Cemetery, Philadelphia, Pennsylvania
- Military career
- Allegiance: United States of America
- Branch: United States Army; Union Army
- Service years: 1861 - 1865
- Rank: Commissary Sergeant
- Unit: 8th Pennsylvania Cavalry Regiment
- Awards: Medal of Honor

Commissary Sergeant John Galloway (c. 1843 – May 23, 1904) was an American soldier who fought in the American Civil War. Galloway received his country's highest award for bravery during combat, the Medal of Honor, for his action at Farmville, Virginia in April 1865. He was honored with the award on October 30, 1897. He is the brother of fellow Medal of Honor recipient George N. Galloway.

Galloway joined the 8th Pennsylvania Cavalry from Philadelphia in August 1861. He was promoted to regimental commissary sergeant in January 1865, and was discharged the following July with the rank of first lieutenant.

After the war, he became a companion of the Pennsylvania Commandery of the Military Order of the Loyal Legion of the United States. He is buried in Mount Moriah Cemetery in Philadelphia, Pennsylvania.

== Medal of Honor citation ==
Citation: The President of the United States of America, in the name of Congress, takes pleasure in presenting the Medal of Honor to Commissary Sergeant John Galloway, United States Army, for extraordinary heroism on 7 April 1865, while serving with 8th Pennsylvania Cavalry, in action at Farmville, Virginia. His regiment being surprised and nearly overwhelmed, Commissary Sergeant Galloway dashed forward under a heavy fire, reached the right of the regiment, where the danger was greatest, rallied the men and prevented a disaster that was imminent.

== See also ==
- List of American Civil War Medal of Honor recipients: G–L
