= George N. Galloway =

U.S. Medal of Honor recipient

- Born: 1841 or 1842; Philadelphia, Pennsylvania, US
- Died: February 9, 1904 (aged 63-64); Philadelphia, Pennsylvania, US
- Burial place: Mount Moriah Cemetery, Philadelphia, Pennsylvania
- Military career
- Allegiance: United States of America
- Branch: United States Army
- Service years: 1861 - 1864
- Rank: Private
- Units: Company G, 95th Pennsylvania Volunteer Infantry Regiment
- Conflicts: American Civil War
- Awards: Medal of Honor

George Norton Galloway (1841 or 1842 – February 9, 1904) was a United States soldier who fought in the American Civil War as a member of the Union Army. On military records of the period, his surname was spelled as "Gallaway" or "Galloway". He is the brother of fellow Medal of Honor recipient John Galloway (Medal of Honor).

== Formative years ==
Born in Philadelphia, Pennsylvania, Galloway was employed as a brush maker during the early 1860s. Pennsylvania military records created in 1861 documented that he was 5' 9-1/2" tall with brown hair, dark eyes, and a light complexion during his late teen years.

== Military career ==
Galloway enrolled for Civil War military service in Philadelphia on September 19, 1861. Mustering in there that same day as a private, he became part of Company G in the 95th Pennsylvania Infantry Regiment (also known as the 95th Pennsylvania Volunteers).

Military records indicate that Galloway deserted his regiment on July 1, 1863, the day before the 95th Pennsylvania fought in Gettysburg. Arrested on September 2, 1863, he was later sent back to his unit, where he remained until he was transferred October 14, 1864. It was during this period of service that he demonstrated such bravery that he was awarded his nation's highest award for valor, the U.S. Medal of Honor. He was then honorably discharged from military service on November 18, 1864.

He died on February 9, 1904, and is interred at Mount Moriah Cemetery in Philadelphia, Pennsylvania.

== Medal of Honor citation ==
Galloway was presented with his U.S. Medal of Honor on October 24, 1895. Awarded for his actions at Alsop's Farm in Virginia in May 1864, his citation read as follows:

The President of the United States of America, in the name of Congress, takes pleasure in presenting the Medal of Honor to Private George Norton Galloway, United States Army, for extraordinary heroism on 8 May 1864, while serving with Company G, 95th Pennsylvania Infantry, in action at Alsops Farm, Virginia. Private Galloway voluntarily held an important position under heavy fire.

== See also ==
- List of American Civil War Medal of Honor recipients: G–L
