= Medal of Honor =

Highest award in the United States Armed Forces

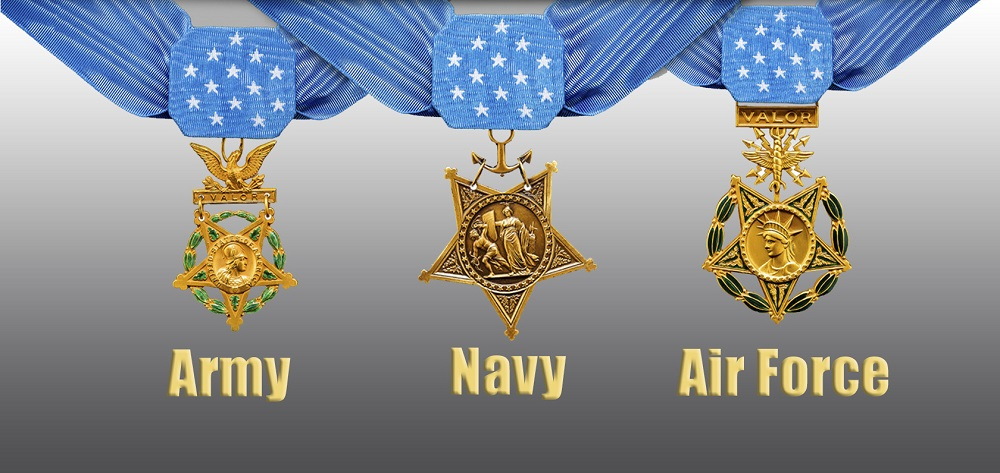
- Medals of Honor of the three military departments
- Type: Military medal
- Awarded for: Conspicuous gallantry and intrepidity at the risk of life above and beyond the call of duty (Note: As amended by Act of July 25, 1963)
- Country: United States
- Presented by: The president of the United States in the name of Congress
- Eligibility: United States Armed Forces service members
- Status: Actively awarded
- Established: Naval Service: December 21, 1861; Army: July 12, 1862; Air Force: August 10, 1956; Coast Guard: July 25, 1963; Space Force: January 1, 2021
- First award: March 25, 1863 (Note: For service in the American Civil War to a U.S. Army Private Jacob Parrott.)

Highlights
- Total awarded posthumously: 618
- Total recipients: 3,536 recipients (3,555 MOH awarded)
- Service ribbon and flag

Precedence
- Next (lower): Army: Distinguished Service Cross; Naval Service: Navy Cross; Air and Space Forces: Air Force Cross; Coast Guard: Coast Guard Cross

The Medal of Honor (MOH) is the highest military decoration of the United States Armed Forces and is awarded to recognize American soldiers, sailors, marines, airmen, guardians, and coast guardsmen who have distinguished themselves by acts of valor. The medal is normally awarded by the president of the United States (the commander in chief of the armed forces) and is presented "in the name of Congress." According to the Congressional Medal of Honor Society, (Note: The Congressional Medal of Honor Society includes the word Congressional only because the organization itself exists under a Congressional charter; the medal does not include the word Congressional.) Congressional Medal of Honor (CMOH) "is sometimes mistakenly used because the Medal was created by Congress," though it is not an ongoing Congressional medal but rather a military medal; the official name of the award is simply "Medal of Honor".

There are three distinct variants of the medal: one for the Department of the Army, awarded to soldiers; one for branches of the Department of the Navy, awarded to sailors, marines, and coast guardsmen; and one for military branches of the Department of the Air Force, awarded to airmen and guardians. The Medal of Honor was introduced for the Naval Service in 1861, soon followed by the Army's version in 1862. The Air Force used the Army's version until they received their own distinctive version in 1965. The Medal of Honor is the oldest continuously issued combat decoration of the United States Armed Forces. The president typically presents the Medal of Honor at a formal ceremony intended to represent the gratitude of the American people, with posthumous presentations made to the primary next of kin.

There have been 3,555 Medals of Honor awarded, to 3,536 recipients, with over 40 percent awarded for actions during the American Civil War. A total of 911 Army medals were revoked after Congress authorized a review in 1917, and a number of Navy medals were also revoked before the turn of the century—none of these are included in this total except for those that were subsequently restored. In 1990, Congress designated March 25 as Medal of Honor Day.

== History ==
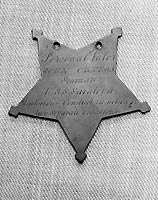
Medal of Honor (without the suspension ribbon) awarded to Seaman John Ortega in 1864.

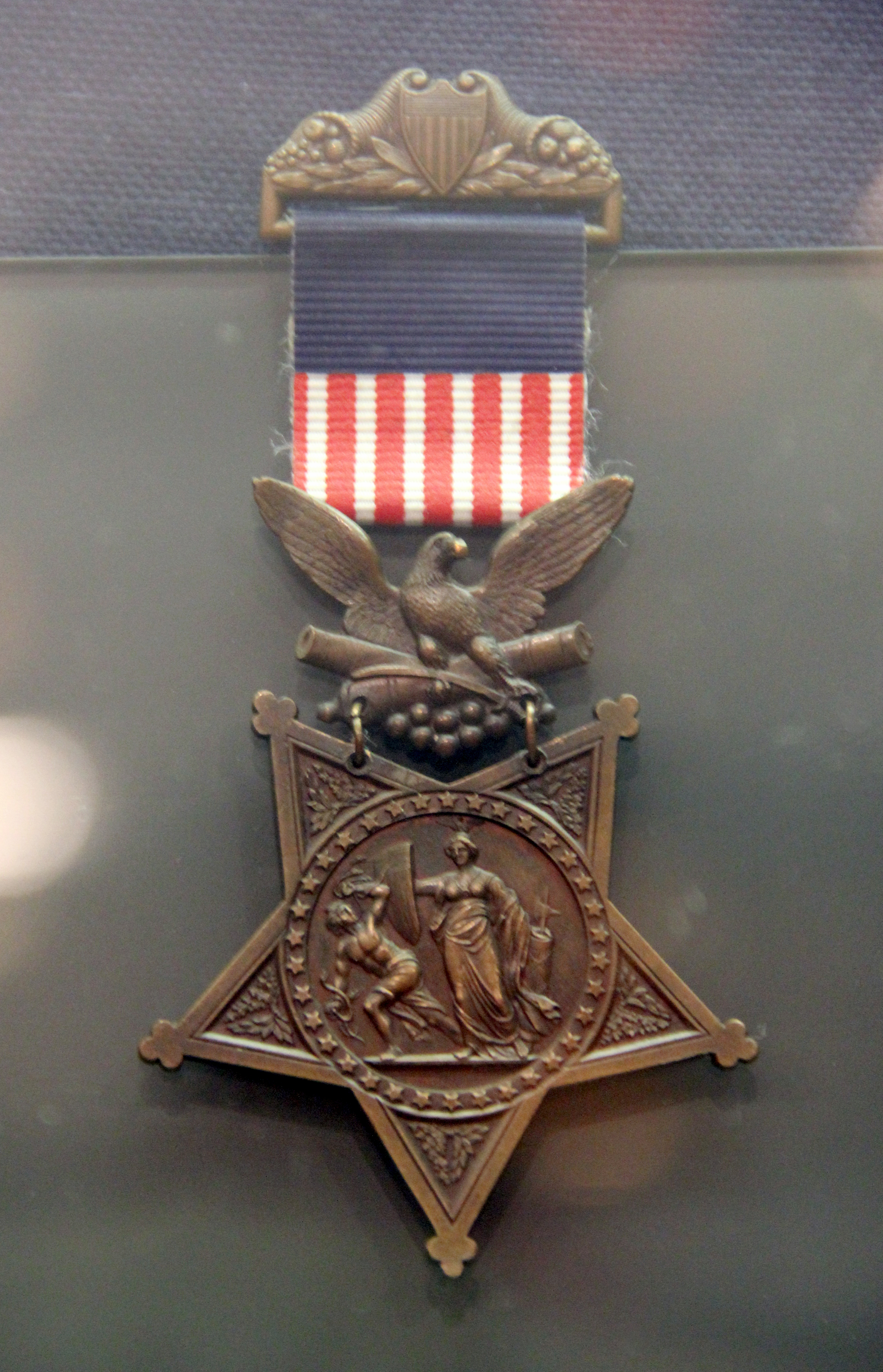
Medal of Honor awarded posthumously in 1866 to John Morehead Scott, one of the Andrews Raiders

In 1861, early in the American Civil War, a proposal for a battlefield decoration for valor was submitted to Lieutenant General Winfield Scott, the Commanding General of the United States Army, by Lieutenant Colonel Edward D. Townsend, an assistant adjutant at the Department of War and Scott's chief of staff. Scott, however, was strongly against the American republic's awarding medals for valor, a European monarchical tradition. After Scott retired in October 1861, however, Secretary of the Navy Gideon Welles adopted the idea of a decoration to recognize and honor distinguished naval service.

On December 9, 1861, Iowa senator James W. Grimes, Chairman on the Committee on Naval Affairs, introduced bill S. 82. The bill included a provision authorizing 200 "medals of honor," "to be bestowed upon such petty officers, seamen, landsmen, and marines as shall most distinguish themselves by their gallantry in action and other seaman-like qualities during the present war ...". On December 21, the bill was passed and signed into law by President Abraham Lincoln. Secretary Welles directed the Philadelphia Mint to design the new military decoration. On May 15, 1862, the United States Department of the Navy ordered 175 medals ($1.85 each) from the U.S. Mint in Philadelphia with "Personal Valor" inscribed on the back of each one.

On February 15, 1862, Senator Henry Wilson, the chairman of the Senate Committee on Military Affairs and the Militia, introduced a resolution (equivalent to a bill) for a Medal of Honor for the Army. The resolution (equivalent to a modern Act of Congress) was approved by Congress and signed into law on July 12, 1862. This measure provided for awarding a medal of honor "to such non-commissioned officers and privates as shall most distinguish themselves by their gallantry in action and other soldier-like qualities during the present insurrection." By mid-November the Department of War contracted with Philadelphia silversmith William Wilson and Son, who had been responsible for the Navy's design, to prepare 2,000 medals for the Army ($2.00 each) to be struck at the mint. The Army's version had "The Congress to" engraved on the back of the medal. Both versions were made of copper and coated with bronze, which "gave them a reddish tint."

On March 3, 1863, Congress made the Army Medal of Honor a permanent decoration by passing legislation permitting the award to such soldiers "as have most distinguished or who may hereafter most distinguish themselves in action." The same legislation also authorized the medal for officers of the Army. On March 25, 1863, the secretary of war presented the first Medals of Honor to six U.S. Army volunteers in his office.

In 1896, the ribbon of the Army's version of the Medal of Honor was redesigned with all stripes being vertical. Again, in 1904 the planchet of the Army's version of the Medal of Honor was redesigned by General George Lewis Gillespie. The purpose of the redesign was to help distinguish the Medal of Honor from other medals, particularly the membership insignia issued by the Grand Army of the Republic.

In 1917, based on the report of the Medal of Honor Review Board, established by Congress in 1916, 911 recipients were stricken from the Army's Medal of Honor list because the medal had been awarded inappropriately. Among them were William Frederick "Buffalo Bill" Cody and Mary Edwards Walker. In 1977, the Army's board for correction of military records unilaterally restored Walker's medal at the request of a relative. The board had no authority to overturn a statute, and the restoration violated not only the period law during the Civil War, but also the law requiring revocation in 1916, and modern law in 1977. As a reaction to Walker's restoration, a relative of Cody's requested the same action from the Army's board for correction, and it reinstated the medals for Cody and four other civilian scouts on June 12, 1989. Subsequent litigation over the Garlin Conner award, which was recommended by the Army's board for correction of military records in 2015, established that the correction boards lack the authority to unilaterally award Medals of Honor. In Conner's case, the board merely recommended the medal, which was then referred to the Senior Army Decorations Board, and ultimately to the secretary of the Army, the secretary of defense, and the president, who requested a waiver be passed by Congress.

A separate Coast Guard Medal of Honor was authorized in 1963 but was not designed or awarded. A separate design for a version of the medal for the Department of the Air Force was authorized in 1956, design completed on April 14, 1965, and first awarded in January 1967. Previously, airmen of the U.S. Air Force received the Army's version of the medal.

== Appearance ==
There are three versions of the Medal of Honor, one for each of the military departments of the Department of Defense (DoD): the Department of the Army, Department of the Navy (including the Navy, Marine Corps, and Coast Guard), and Department of the Air Force (Air and Space Forces). Members of the Coast Guard, part of the Department of Homeland Security, are eligible to receive the Naval version. Each medal is constructed differently, and the components are made from gilding metals and red brass alloys with some gold plating, enamel, and bronze pieces. The United States Congress considered a bill in 2004 which would require the Medal of Honor to be made with 90% gold, the same composition as the lesser-known Congressional Gold Medal, but the bill did not pass Congress.

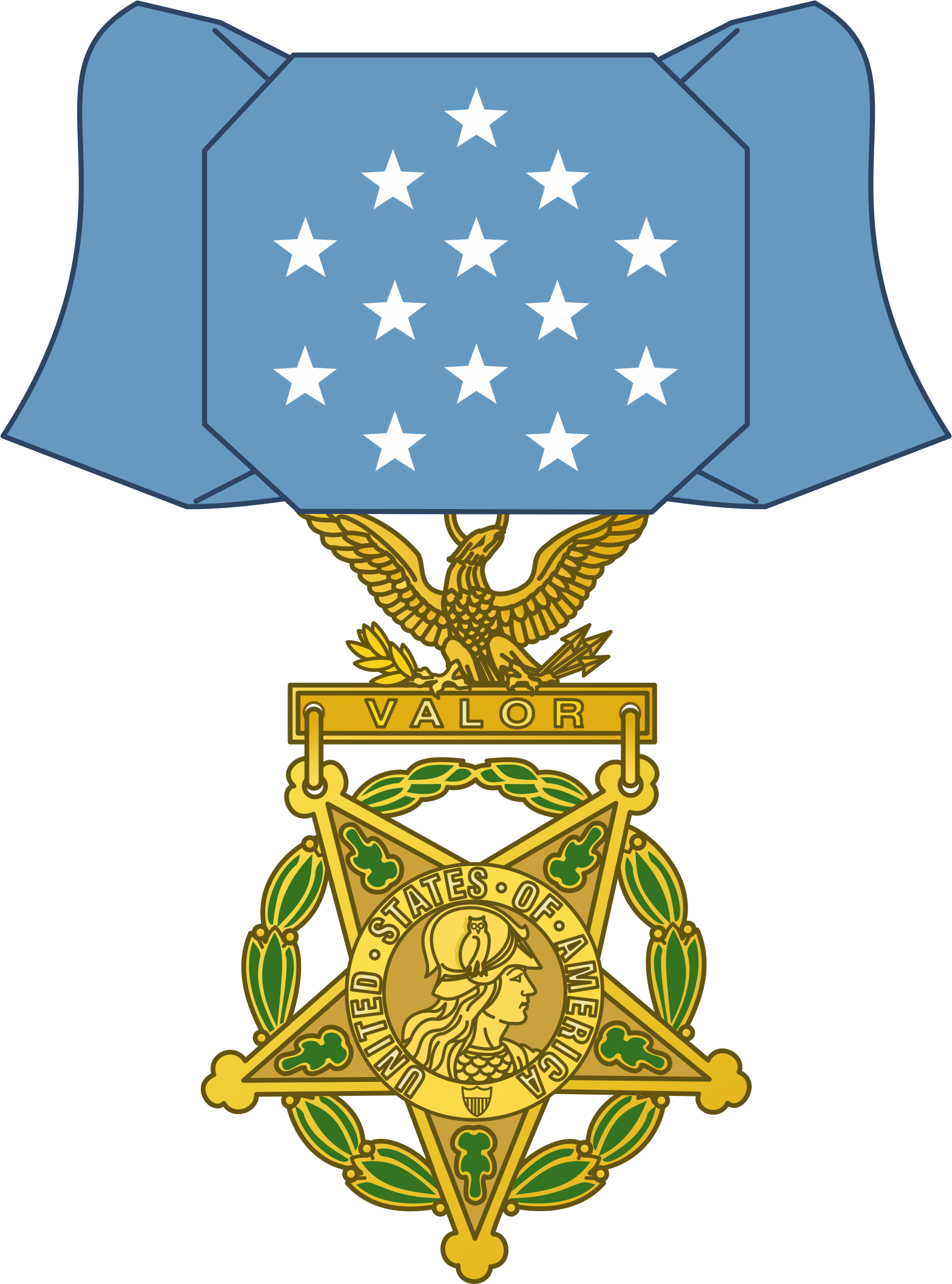
Army Medal of Honor

Naval Medal of Honor

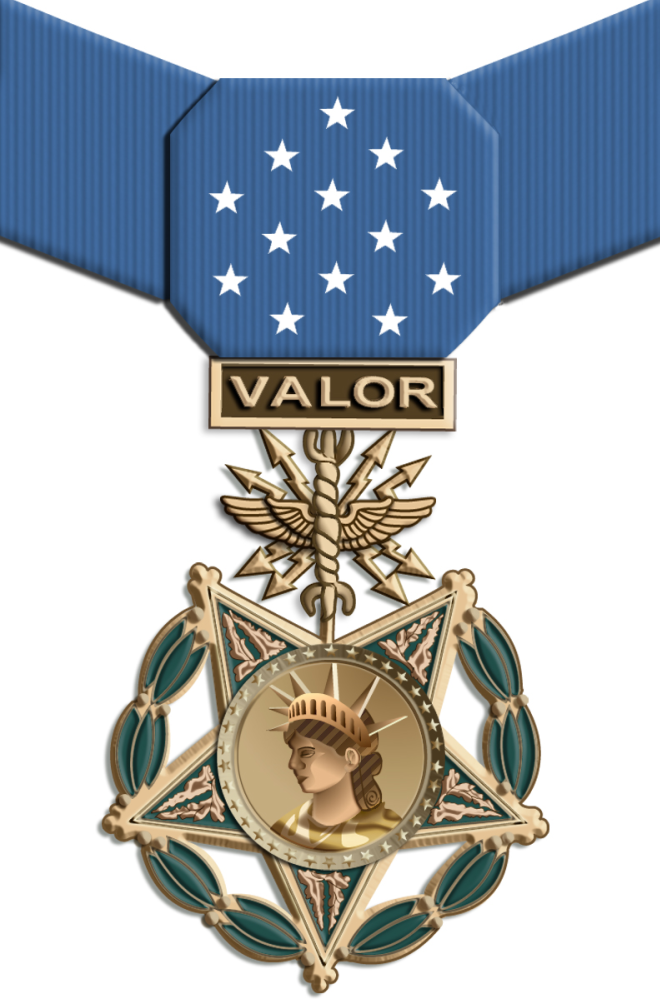
Air and Space Forces Medal of Honor

=== Army variant ===
The Army's version is described by the Institute of Heraldry as "a gold five-pointed star, each point tipped with trefoils, 1 1/2 inches [3.8 cm] wide, surrounded by a green laurel wreath and suspended from a gold bar inscribed VALOR, surmounted by an eagle. In the center of the star, Minerva's head surrounded by the words UNITED STATES OF AMERICA. On each ray of the star is a green oak leaf. On the reverse is a bar engraved THE CONGRESS TO with a space for engraving the name of the recipient." The pendant and suspension bar are made of gilding metal, with the eye, jump rings, and suspension ring made of red brass. The finish on the pendant and suspension bar is hard enameled, gold plated, and rose gold plated, with polished highlights.

=== Naval variant ===
The Naval version is described as "a five-pointed bronze star, tipped with trefoils containing a crown of laurel and oak. In the center is Minerva, personifying the United States, standing with her left hand resting on fasces and her right hand holding a shield emblazoned with the shield from the coat of arms of the United States. She repulses Discord, represented by snakes (originally, she was repulsing the snakes of secession). The medal is suspended from the flukes of an anchor." It is made of solid red brass, oxidized and buffed.

=== Air and Space Forces variant ===
The Air and Space Forces version is described as "within a wreath of green laurel, a gold five-pointed star, one point down, tipped with trefoils and each point containing a crown of laurel and oak on a green background. Centered on the star, an annulet of 34 stars is a representation of the head of the Statue of Liberty. The star is suspended from a bar inscribed with the word VALOR above an adaptation of Jupiter's thunderbolt from the Department of the Air Force's seal. The pendant is made of gilding metal. The connecting bar, hinge, and pin are made of bronze. The finish on the pendant and suspension bar is hard enameled, gold plated, and rose gold plated, with buffed relief.

=== Historic versions ===
The Medal of Honor has evolved in appearance over time. The inverted pentagram design of the Naval version's pendant adopted in early 1862 has not changed since its inception. The Army's 1862 version followed and was identical to the Naval version except an eagle perched atop cannons was used instead of an anchor to connect the pendant to the suspension ribbon. The medals featured a female allegory of the Union, with a shield in her right hand that she used to fend off a crouching attacker and serpents. In her left hand, she held a fasces. There are 34 stars surrounding the scene, representing the number of states in the union at the time. In 1896, the Army version changed the ribbon's design and colors due to misuse and imitation by nonmilitary organizations. In 1904, the Army "Gillespie" version introduced a smaller redesigned star and the ribbon was changed to the light blue pattern with white stars seen today. The 1904 Army version also introduced a bar with the word "Valor" above the star. In 1913, the Naval version adopted the same ribbon pattern.

After World War I, the Department of the Navy decided to separate the Medal of Honor into two versions, one for combat and one for non-combat. This was an attempt to circumvent the requirement enacted in 1919 that recipients participate "in action involving actual conflict with the enemy," which would have foreclosed non-combat awards. By treating the 1919 Medal of Honor as a separate award from its Civil War counterpart, this allowed the Department of the Navy to claim that it was not literally in violation of the 1919 law. The original upside-down star was designated as the non-combat version and a new pattern of the medal pendant, in cross form, was designed by the Tiffany Company in 1919. Secretary of the Navy Josephus Daniels selected Tiffany after snubbing the Commission of Fine Arts, which had submitted drawings that Daniels criticized as "un-American". The so-called Tiffany Cross was to be presented to a sailor or marine who "in action involving actual conflict with the enemy, distinguish[es] himself conspicuously by gallantry and intrepidity at the risk of his life above and beyond the call of duty." Despite the "actual conflict" guidelines, the Tiffany Cross was awarded to Navy CDR (later RADM) Richard E. Byrd and Floyd Bennett for their flight to the North Pole in 1926. The decision was controversial within the Navy's Bureau of Navigation (which handled personnel administration), and officials considered asking the attorney general of the United States for an advisory opinion on the matter. Byrd himself apparently disliked the Tiffany Cross, and eventually requested the alternate version of the medal from President Herbert Hoover in 1930. The Tiffany Cross itself was not popular among recipients—one author reflected that it was "the most short-lived, legally contentious, and unpopular version of the Medal of Honor in American history." In 1942, in response to a lawsuit, the Department of the Navy requested an amendment to expressly allow noncombat awards of the Medal of Honor. When the amendment passed, the Department of the Navy returned to using only the original 1862 inverted 5-point star design and retired the Tiffany Cross.

In 1944, the suspension ribbons for both versions were replaced with the now-familiar neck ribbon. When the Air and Space Force's version was designed in 1965, it incorporated similar elements and design from the Army version. At the Department of the Air Force leadership's insistence, the new medal depicted the Statue of Liberty's image in place of Minerva on the medal and changed the connecting device from an eagle to Jupiter's thunderbolt flanked with wings as found on the Department of the Air Force's seal. The Air Force diverged from the traditional depiction of Minerva in part due to a desire to distinguish itself from the Army, including the Institute of Heraldry that traditionally designs awards, but which falls under the Army.

1862–1895 Army version

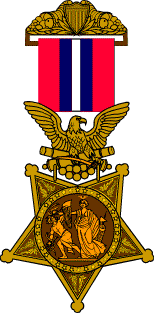
1896–1903 Army version

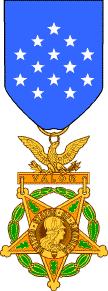
1904–1944 Army version

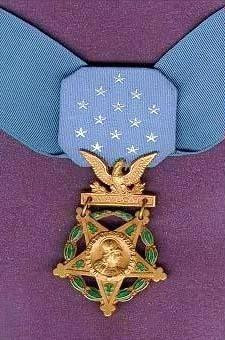
Post 1944 Army version
1862–1912 Navy version

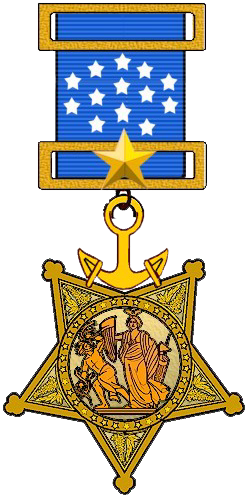
1913–1942 Navy version

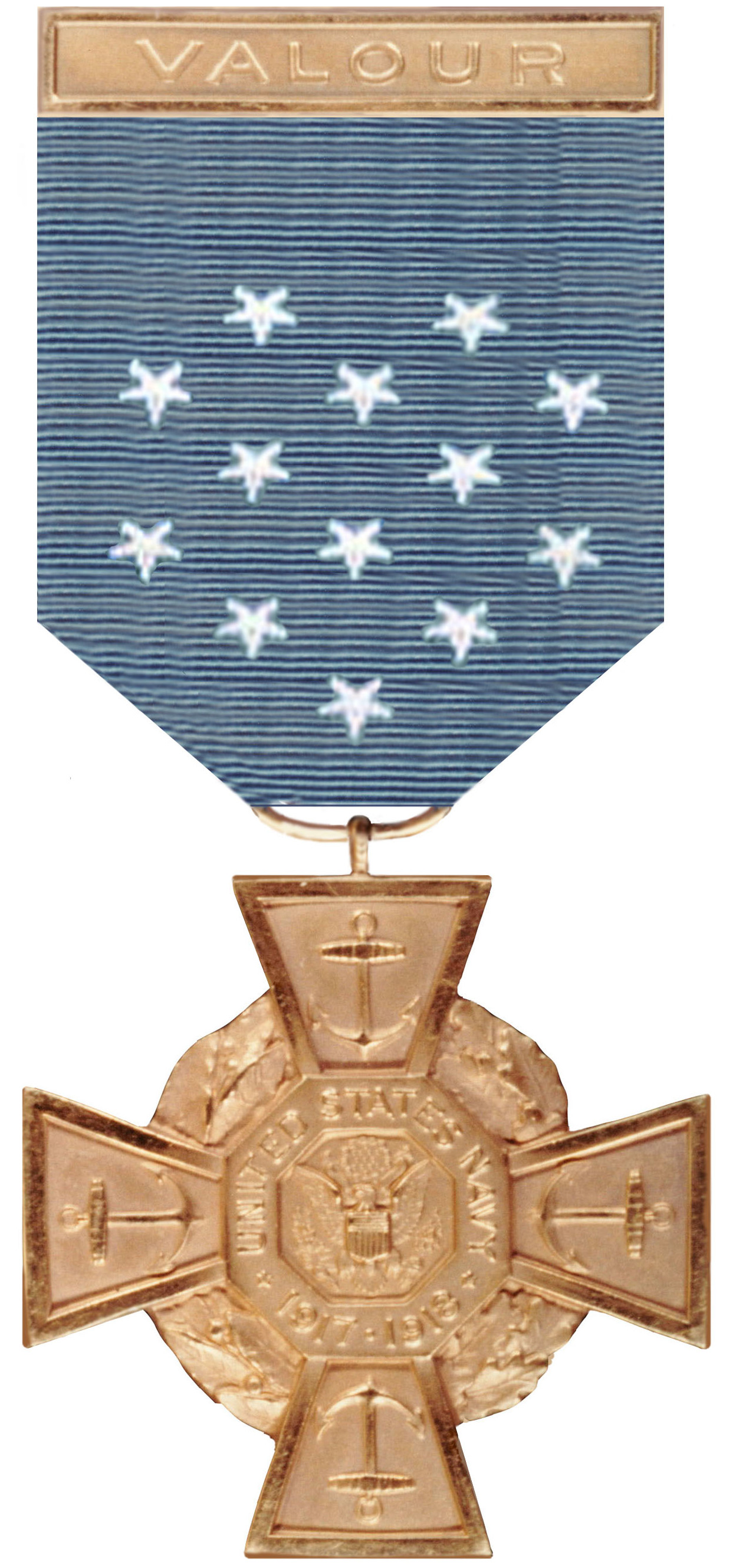
1919–1942 Navy "Tiffany Cross" version

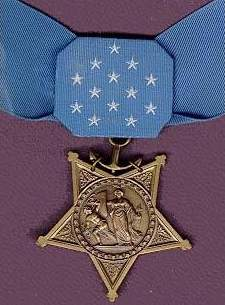
Post 1942 Navy version

== Neck ribbon, service ribbon and lapel button ==
Service ribbon

On May 2, 1896, Congress authorized a "ribbon to be worn with the medal and [a] rosette or knot to be worn in lieu of the medal." The service ribbon is light blue with five white stars in the form of an "M." It is placed first in the top position in the order of precedence and is worn for situations other than full-dress military uniform. The lapel button is a 1/2-inch (13 mm), six-sided light blue bowknot rosette with thirteen white stars and may be worn on appropriate civilian clothing on the left lapel.

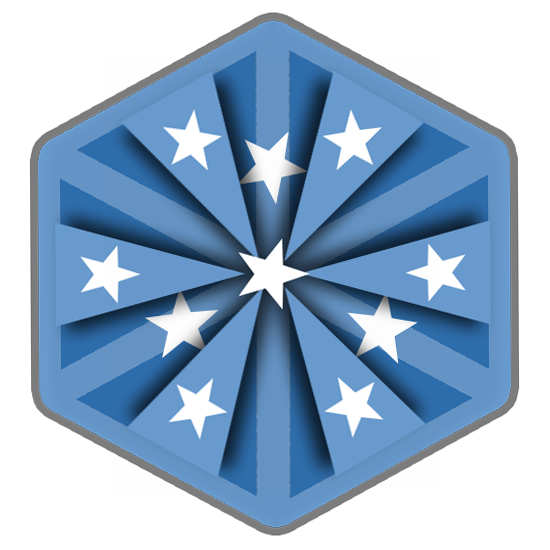
Medal of Honor rosette lapel button

Since 1944, the Medal of Honor has been attached to a light blue colored moiré silk neck ribbon that is 1 3/16 in (30 mm) in width and 21 3/4 in (550 mm) in length. The center of the ribbon displays thirteen white stars in the form of three chevron. Both the top and middle chevrons are made up of five stars, with the bottom chevron made of three stars. The medal itself differs by branch:

=== Department of the Army ===
A gold five-pointed star, each point tipped with trefoils, one inch wide, surrounded by a green laurel wreath and suspended from a gold bar inscribed "VALOR" surmounted by an eagle. In the center of the star, Minerva's head surrounded by the words "UNITED STATES OF AMERICA." On each ray of the star is a green oak leaf. On the reverse is a bar engraved "THE CONGRESS TO" with a space for engraving the name of the recipient.

=== Department of the Navy ===
The Navy Medal of Honor is a five-pointed bronze star, tipped with trefoils containing a crown of laurel and oak. In the center is Minerva, personifying the United States, standing with left hand resting of fasces and right hand holding a shield blazoned with the shield from the coat of arms of the United States. She repulses Discord, represented by snakes. The medal is suspended from the flukes of an anchor.

=== Department of the Air Force ===
Within a wreath of green laurel, a gold five-pointed star, one point down, tipped with trefoils and each point containing a crown of laurel and oak on a green background. Centered on the star, an annulet of 34 stars is a representation of the head of the Statue of Liberty. The star is suspended from a bar inscribed with the word "VALOR" above an adaptation of the thunderbolt from the Air Force Coat of Arms.

The Medal of Honor is one of only two United States military awards suspended from a neck ribbon. The other is the Commander's Degree of the Legion of Merit, and is usually awarded to individuals serving foreign governments.

== Devices ==
In 2011, Department of Defense (DOD) instructions in regard to the Medal of Honor were amended to read "for each succeeding act that would otherwise justify award of the [Medal of Honor], the individual receiving the subsequent award is authorized to wear an additional [Medal of Honor] ribbon or a "V" Device on the Medal of Honor suspension ribbon" (the "V" device is a 1/4-inch-high (6.4 mm) bronze miniature letter "V" with serifs that denotes valor). The Medal of Honor was the only decoration authorized to use the "V" device (none were ever issued) to designate subsequent awards in such a fashion. Nineteen individuals, all now deceased, were double Medal of Honor recipients. Effective December 2016, the relevant DOD manual was updated to read:

A separate MOH is presented to an individual for each succeeding act that justifies award. A [service] member awarded more than one MOH will always wear a separate MOH or separate MOH ribbon to correspond with the number of awards received.

The update further explicitly removed authorization for any device(s) on the MOH:

There are no attachments authorized for the MOH.

== Medal of Honor Flag ==
Medal of Honor Flag

On October 23, 2002, Pub. L. 107–248 (text) (PDF) was enacted, modifying 36 U.S.C. § 903, authorizing a Medal of Honor Flag to be presented to each person to whom a Medal of Honor is awarded. In the case of a posthumous award, the flag will be presented to whomever the Medal of Honor is presented to, which in most cases will be the primary next of kin of the deceased awardee.

The flag was based on a concept by retired U.S. Army Special Forces First Sergeant Bill Kendall of Jefferson, Iowa, who in 2001, designed a flag to honor Medal of Honor recipient Army Air Forces Captain Darrell Lindsey, a Martin B-26 Marauder pilot from Jefferson who was killed in action during World War II. Kendall's design of a light blue field emblazoned with 13 white five-pointed stars was nearly identical to that of Sarah LeClerc's of the Institute of Heraldry. LeClerc's gold-fringed flag, ultimately accepted as the official flag, does not include the words "Medal of Honor" as appeared on Kendall's flag. The color of the field and the 13 white stars, arranged in the form of a three-bar chevron, consisting of two chevrons of five stars and one chevron of three stars, emulate the suspension ribbon of the Medal of Honor. The flag has no defined proportions.

The first Medal of Honor Flag recipient was U.S. Army Sergeant First Class Paul R. Smith, whose flag was presented posthumously. President George W. Bush presented the Medal of Honor and Flag to the family of Smith during the award ceremony for him in the White House on April 4, 2005.

A special Medal of Honor Flag presentation ceremony was held for over 60 living Medal of Honor recipients on board the USS Constitution in September 2006.

== Recommendation process and presentation ==
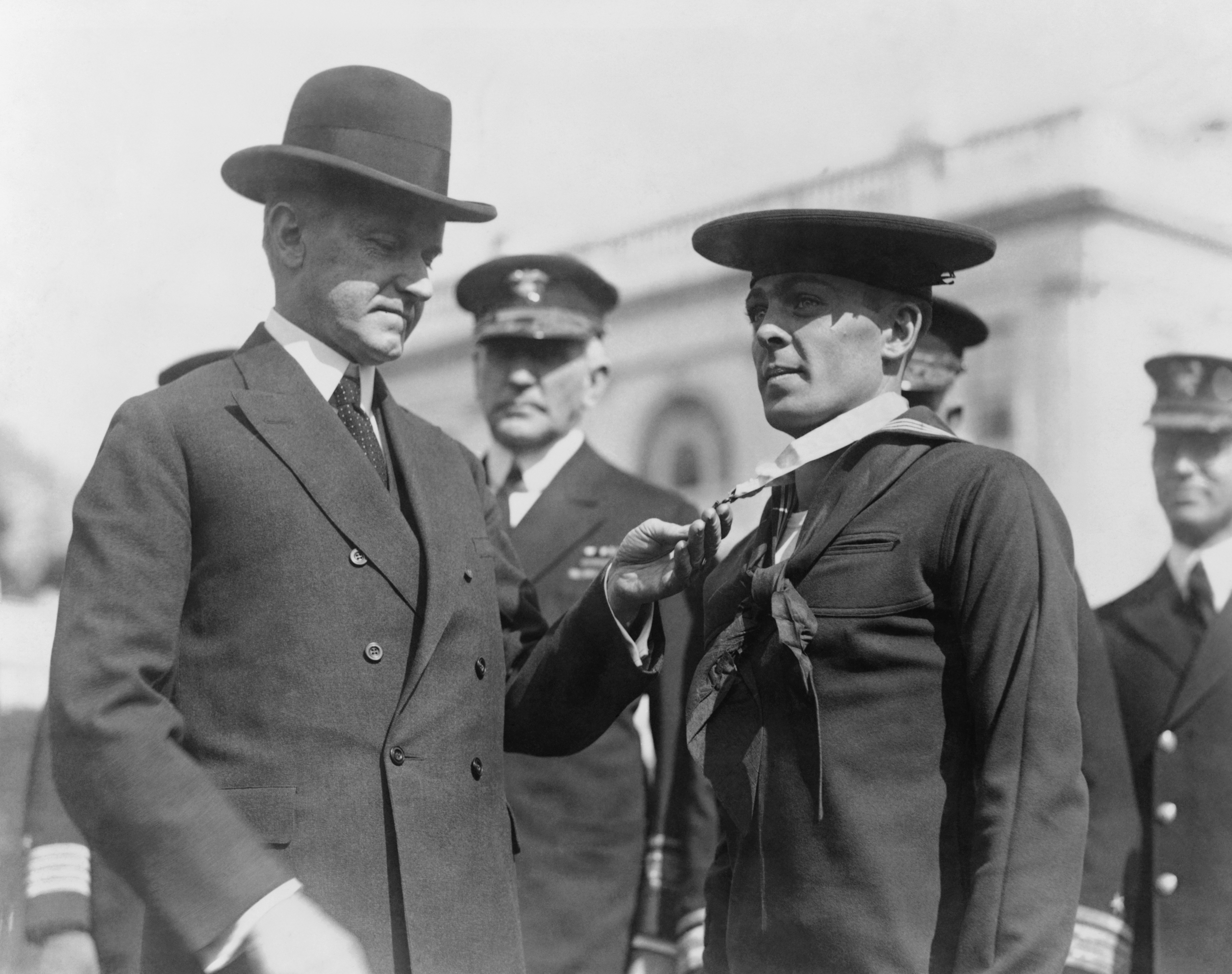
President Calvin Coolidge bestowing the Medal of Honor upon Henry Breault, March 8, 1924

There are two distinct protocols for recommending and adjudicating the Medal of Honor. The first and most common is recommendation within three years and approval within five years through the chain of command of the service member. The second method, which normally applies outside of the statute of limitations, is when a recommendation is referred to a military service by a member of the U.S. Congress, generally at the request of a constituent under 10 U.S.C. § 1130. In both cases, if the proposal is outside the time limits for the recommendation, approval to waive the time limit requires a special Act of Congress. The Medal of Honor is presented by the President on behalf of, and in the name of, the Congress. Since 1980, nearly all Medal of Honor recipients—or in the case of posthumous awards, the next of kin—have been personally decorated by the president. Since 1941, more than half of the Medals of Honor have been awarded posthumously.

== Evolution of criteria ==
=== Awarding ===
==== 19th century (Navy) ====
Navy regulations published in 1865 specified that "The medal shall only be awarded to those petty officers, and others indicated, who shall have evinced in battle some signal act of valor or devotion to their country; and nothing save such conduct, coupled with good general qualities in the service, shall be held to establish a sufficient claim to it." The regulation also permitted awards to seamen for "extraordinary heroism in the line of their profession," which meant heroism outside of combat operations.

==== 19th century (Army) ====
Several months after President Abraham Lincoln signed Public Resolution 82 into law on December 21, 1861, for a Navy medal of honor, a similar resolution was passed in July 1862 for an Army version of the medal. Six U.S. Army soldiers who hijacked a Confederate locomotive named The General in 1862 were the first Medal of Honor recipients; James J. Andrews led the raid. He was caught and hanged as a U.S. spy, but as a civilian he was not eligible to receive the medal. Many Medals of Honor awarded in the 19th century were associated with "saving the flag" (and country), not just for patriotic reasons, but because the U.S. flag was a primary means of battlefield communication at the time. Because no other military decoration was authorized during the Civil War, some seemingly less exceptional and notable actions were recognized by a Medal of Honor during that conflict.

==== 20th century ====
Early in the twentieth century, the Department of the Navy awarded many Medals of Honor for peacetime bravery. For instance, in 1901, John Henry Helms aboard USS Chicago was awarded the medal for saving the ship's cook from drowning. Six sailors aboard USS Iowa were awarded the medal after the ship's boiler exploded on January 25, 1904. Richard Byrd and Floyd Bennett were awarded the medal—the combat ("Tiffany") version despite the existence then of a non-combat form of the Navy medal—for the 1926 flight they claim reached the North Pole. And Ensign Thomas J. Ryan was awarded the medal for saving a woman from the burning Grand Hotel in Yokohama, Japan, following the 1923 Great Kantō earthquake. Between 1919 and 1942, the Department of the Navy issued two separate versions of the Medal of Honor, one for acts related to combat and one for non-combat bravery.

==== World War I ====
The criteria for the award tightened during World War I for the Army version of the Medal of Honor, while the Navy version retained a non-combat provision until 1963. In an Act of Congress of July 9, 1918, the War Department version of the medal required that the recipient "distinguish himself conspicuously by gallantry and intrepidity at the risk of his life above and beyond the call of duty," and also required that the act of valor be performed "in action involving actual conflict with an enemy." This followed shortly after the results of the Army Medal of Honor Review Board, which struck 911 medals from the Medal of Honor list in February 1917 for lack of basic prerequisites. These included the members of the 27th Maine erroneously awarded the medal for reenlisting to guard the capital during the Civil War, 29 members of Abraham Lincoln's funeral detail, and six civilians, including Buffalo Bill Cody (restored along with four other scouts in 1989) and a doctor, Mary Edwards Walker, who had cared for the sick (this last was restored posthumously in 1977).

==== World War II ====
As a result of lawsuits, the Department of the Navy requested the Congress expressly authorize non-combat medals in the text of the authorizing statute, since the department had been awarding non-combat medals with questionable legal backing that had caused it much embarrassment. The last non-combat Navy Medal of Honor was awarded in 1945, although the Department of the Navy attempted to award a non-combat Medal of Honor as late as the Korean War. Official accounts vary, but generally, the Medal of Honor for combat was known as the "Tiffany Cross", after the company that designed the medal. The Tiffany Cross was first awarded in 1919, but was unpopular partly because of its design as well as a lower gratuity than the Navy's original medal. The Tiffany Cross Medal of Honor was awarded at least three times in non-combat circumstances. By a special Act of Congress, the medal was presented to Byrd and Bennett (see above). In 1942, the Department of the Navy reverted to a single Medal of Honor, although the statute still contained a loophole allowing the award for both "action involving actual conflict with the enemy" or "in the line of his profession." Arising from these criteria, approximately 60 percent of the medals earned during and after World War II have been awarded posthumously.

==== Vietnam era ====
With the passage of Public Law 88–77 on July 25, 1963, the requirements for the Medal of Honor were standardized among all the services, requiring that a recipient had "distinguished himself conspicuously by gallantry and intrepidity at the risk of his life above and beyond the call of duty." Thus, the act removed the loophole allowing non-combat awards to Navy personnel. The act also clarified that the act of valor must occur during one of three circumstances:

1. While engaged in action against an enemy of the United States
2. While engaged in military operations involving conflict with an opposing foreign force.
3. While serving with friendly foreign forces engaged in an armed conflict against an opposing armed force in which the United States is not a belligerent party.

Congress drew these three circumstances of combat from President Kennedy's executive order of April 25, 1962, which previously added the same criteria to the Purple Heart. On August 24, Kennedy added similar criteria for the Bronze Star Medal. The amendment was necessary because Cold War armed conflicts did not qualify for consideration under previous statutes such as the 1918 Army Medal of Honor statute that required valor "in action involving actual conflict with an enemy," since the United States has not formally declared war since World War II as a result of the provisions of the United Nations Charter. According to congressional testimony by the Army's Deputy Chief of Staff for Personnel, the services were seeking authority to award the Medal of Honor and other valor awards retroactive to July 1, 1958, in areas such as Berlin, Lebanon, Quemoy and Matsu Islands, Taiwan Straits, Congo, Laos, Vietnam, and Cuba.

==== Modern adjudication ====
Recommendations for valor awards are processed under three basic pathways. First, a recommendation can originate with a servicemember's chain of command. Normally, servicemembers may not self-recommend for awards. In cases of chain of command recommendation, each intermediate commander will recommend approval or disapproval, citing "specific reasons when disapproval is recommended." The approval authority for the Medal of Honor is the president of the United States, although in the past this has been delegated to subordinate commanders.

If outside of statutory time limitations, another pathway is for a member of Congress to submit a recommendation package for service review under 10 USC 1130, or for Congress to otherwise waive time limitations by statute. A third pathway is for award packages that are submitted timely but lost during processing and then later rediscovered, which permits a service secretary to waive time limitations without seeking a congressional waiver.

Most services first screen submissions at their awards branches. For the Army, this entails a review at the Human Resources Command level to determine if the award package is complete according to law and regulation. Next, the package is reviewed by the Army Decorations Board. Then the Senior Army Decorations Board (SADB) reviews the package—this body "draws its membership from lieutenant generals who serve in the office of the Secretary of the Army and on the Army Staff," and is "responsible for reviewing high level valor awards and making recommendations to the Secretary of the Army." The equivalent of the SADB in the Navy is the Navy Department Board of Decorations and Medals (NDBDM), and in the Air Force the Secretary of the Air Force Decorations Board (SAFDB).

Above the decorations boards a Medal of Honor recommendation goes to the assistant secretary for manpower and reserve affairs, the chief of staff of the service, the service secretary, the secretary of defense, and ultimately the president.

=== Revocation ===
==== 19th century ====
Early Navy regulations published in the Civil War era permitted the Navy Department to unilaterally rescind Medals of Honor for dishonorable behavior, including being "convicted of treason, cowardice, felony, or any infamous crime." As a result, at least 15 medals were revoked in the nineteenth century, including a medal for Third-Class Boy George Hollat, whose medal was revoked for desertion. Hollat's name erroneously remains on the Navy's list of medal recipients in modern times. The Army did not revoke any medals until the twentieth century.

==== 20th century ====
In the early twentieth century the Medal of Honor Legion requested that some Army Medals of Honor be revoked, in particular the 864 medals awarded to members of the 27th Maine Volunteer Infantry Regiment for reenlisting to guard the capital during the Civil War, many of which were erroneous. The Judge Advocate General of the Army determined that it would be unlawful for the Army to revoke the medals unilaterally absent "fraud, mistake in matters of fact arising from errors in calculation, or newly discovered material evidence," since this would require reopening acts or decisions of predecessors, and thus unsettling administrative res judicata (an administrative finality doctrine). This interpretation led Congress to authorize a review to revoke these medals in 1916, leading to the revocation of 911 medals. The Army later authorized revocation of service medals due to misconduct in 1961, and eventually expanded this authority to include valor decorations (including the Medal of Honor) in 1974. The Army regulation stated "[o]nce an award has been presented, it may be revoked if facts subsequently determined would have prevented original approval of the award, had they been known at the time of award." Eventually, all services' regulations permitted revocation on similar grounds: the Air Force adopted unilateral revocation of valor decorations in 1969, and Navy adopted regulations permitting revocation of valor decorations in 1976.

==== 21st century ====
Unilateral revocation of military decorations (including the Medal of Honor) were eventually standardized by the Office of the Secretary of Defense after controversy surrounding the revocation of the Distinguished Service Cross approved for Army Major Mathew L. Golsteyn, who was charged with murdering a detainee but then pardoned (a grant of forgiveness, which differs from a court's finding of innocence) by President Donald Trump before trial. This incident led DoD to clarify the prerequisites for revoking military awards due to misconduct in the DoD Awards Manual in 2019: "[t]he revocation of [personal military decorations] under the 'honorable' service requirement should be used sparingly and should be limited to those cases where the Service member's actions are not compatible with continued military service, result in criminal convictions, result in determinations that the Service member did not serve satisfactorily in a specific grade or position, or result in a discharge from military service that is characterized as 'Other Than Honorable,' 'Bad Conduct,' or 'Dishonorable.'" DoD also requested that Congress expand the statutory requirement for honorable service after award qualification to include all military decorations, which passed in December 2019. In 2019, a bill titled "Remove the Stain Act" sought to revoke Medals of Honor awarded for conduct during the Wounded Knee Massacre of 1890. The bill directed revocation of 20 Medals of Honor, and also directed removal of the recipients from the Medal of Honor Roll. The number of medals awarded for conduct at Wounded Knee – which was actually 19 – was based on a mistake in the War Department's circular listings in the 1890s, which transcribed Private Marvin Hillock as a Wounded Knee recipient despite actually earning the medal at White Clay Creek a day later. Directing revocation from the MoH Roll was also a mistake, as the Roll of that time was merely a pension listing for recipients who lived past the age of 65 and separated honorably from the military without retiring. Since many of the Wounded Knee recipients did not live to the age of 65, were discharged dishonorably, or were retired from the military, this meant they never would have been on the Roll. The Remove the Stain Act did not pass despite being added to the House version of the FY2022 National Defense Authorization Act. In that particular case, the Senate Committee on Armed Services expressed that "these Medals of Honor were awarded at the prerogative of the president of the United States, not the Congress," suggesting that it was not the role of the legislature to direct awarding or revocation of medals, but rather to control the authorizing criteria for the award. In July 2024, the Secretary of Defense announced a joint DoD and Department of Interior review to consider revoking the Wounded Knee Medals of Honor. Notably, the DoD review cited the joint explanatory statement for the FY2022 National Defense Authorization Act (which removed the Remove the Stain Act from the bill) as the impetus for the medal review. The DoD review concluded in October 2024, reportedly recommending that no medals be revoked. Cheyenne River Sioux Tribe chairman Ryman LeBeau wrote an op-ed on the outcome, saying "the Pentagon board has recommended that America keep the Medals of Honor for the Wounded Knee Massacre" with all three DoD panelists voting against revocation and both Department of Interior (the department charged with Indian affairs) panelists voting in favor.

== Authority and privileges ==
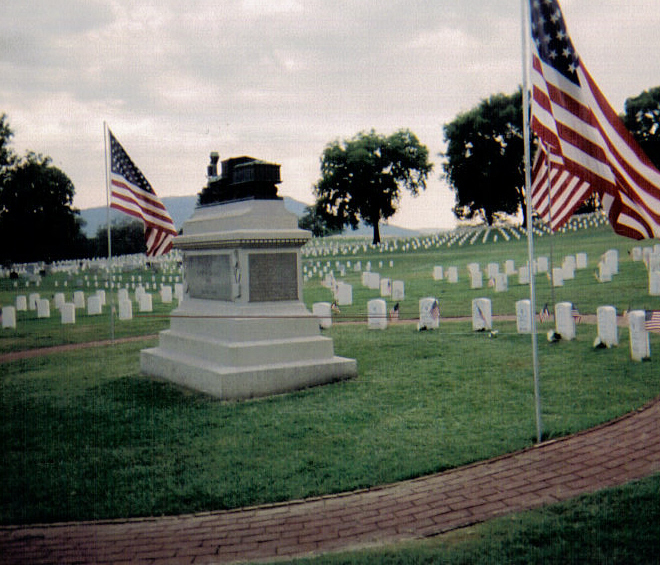
Medal of Honor monument and Medal of Honor headstones of the Civil War recipients of "Andrews Raid" at the Chattanooga National Cemetery in Chattanooga, Tennessee

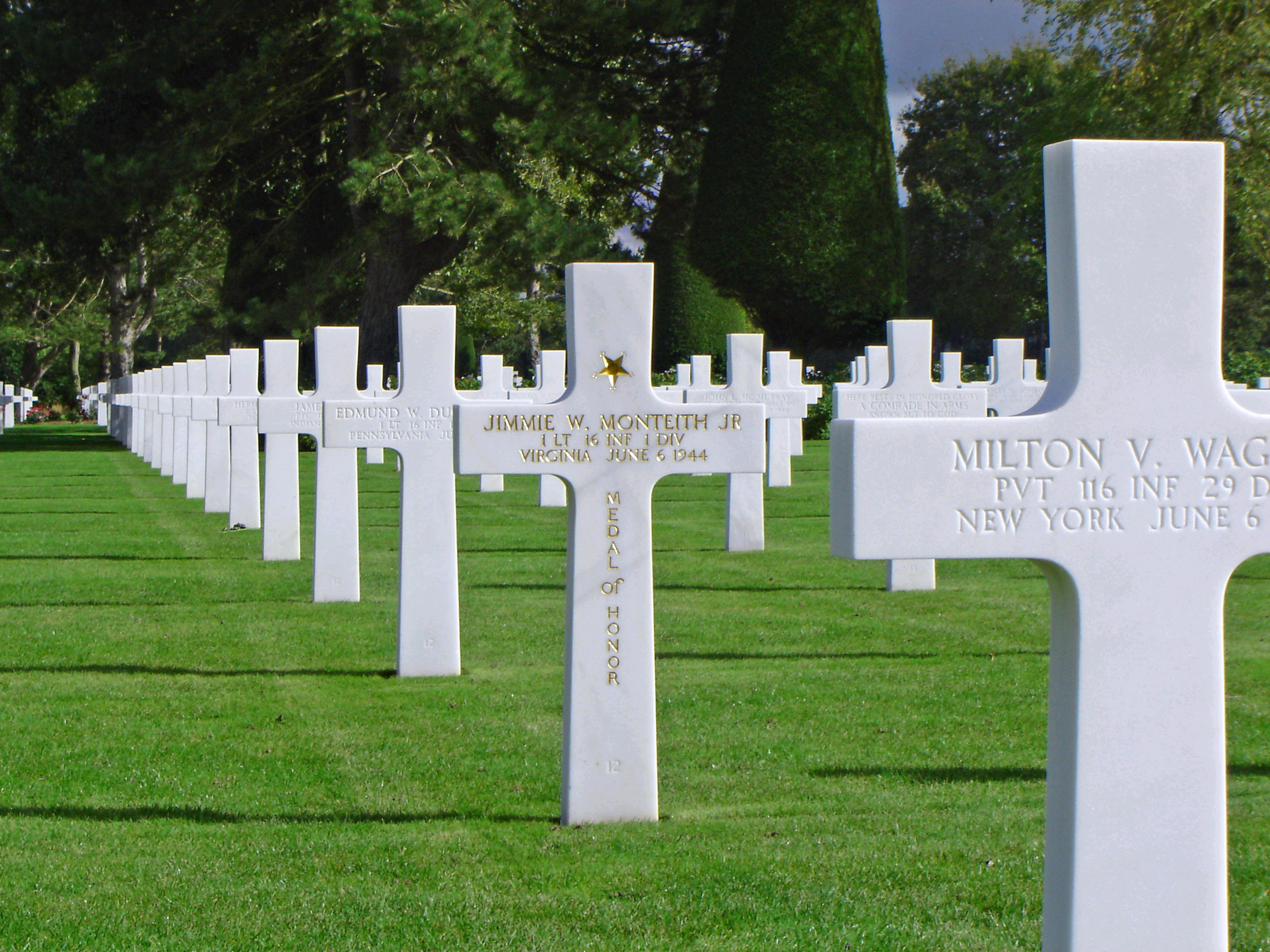
Medal of Honor gravemarker of Jimmie W. Monteith at the Normandy American Cemetery and Memorial

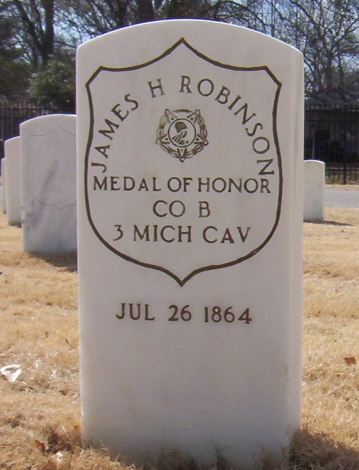
Medal of Honor headstone of James H. Robinson at the Memphis National Cemetery

The four specific statutory sections authorizing the medal, as last amended on January 1, 2021, are as follows:

- Army: 10 U.S.C. § 7271

The President may award, and present in the name of Congress, a medal of honor of appropriate design, with ribbons and appurtenances, to a person who while a member of the Army, distinguished himself conspicuously by gallantry and intrepidity at the risk of his life above and beyond the call of duty....

- Navy and Marine Corps: 10 U.S.C. § 8291

The President may award, and present in the name of Congress, a medal of honor of appropriate design, with ribbons and appurtenances, to a person who, while a member of the naval service, distinguishes himself conspicuously by gallantry and intrepidity at the risk of his life above and beyond the call of duty. . . .

- Air Force and Space Force: 10 U.S.C. § 9271

The President may award, and present in the name of Congress, a medal of honor of appropriate design, with ribbons and appurtenances, to a person who, while a member of the Air Force or the Space Force, distinguishes himself conspicuously by gallantry and intrepidity at the risk of his life above and beyond the call of duty. . . .

- Coast Guard: 14 U.S.C. § 2732 A version is authorized but it has never been awarded. (Note: U.S. Coast Guard Signalman First Class Douglas Albert Munro was posthumously awarded the Navy version of the Medal of Honor for bravery at Guadalcanal on September 27, 1942.)

The President may award, and present in the name of Congress, a medal of honor of appropriate design, with ribbons and appurtenances, to a person who while a member of the [Army] [naval service] [Air Force] [Coast Guard], distinguished himself conspicuously by gallantry and intrepidity at the risk of his life above and beyond the call of duty.

=== Privileges and courtesies ===
The Medal of Honor confers special privileges on its recipients:

- Each Medal of Honor recipient may have his or her name entered on the Medal of Honor Roll (10 U.S.C. § 1134a and 38 U.S.C. § 1562) so long as they qualified for the medal under modern statutory authority.
- Each person whose name is placed on the Medal of Honor Roll is certified to the United States Department of Veterans Affairs as being entitled to receive a monthly pension above and beyond any military pensions or other benefits for which they may be eligible. The pension is subject to cost-of-living increases; as of December 1, 2025, it is $5,625 a month.
- Enlisted recipients of the Medal of Honor are entitled to a supplemental uniform allowance.
- Recipients receive special entitlements to air transportation under the provisions of DOD Regulation 4515.13-R. This benefit allows the recipient to travel as deemed fit, as well as allows the recipient's dependents to travel either overseas–overseas, overseas–continental U.S., or continental U.S.–overseas when accompanied by the recipient.
- Special identification cards and commissary and exchange privileges are provided for Medal of Honor recipients and their eligible dependents.
- Recipients are granted eligibility for interment at Arlington National Cemetery, if not otherwise eligible.
- Fully qualified children of recipients are automatically nominated to any of the United States service academies.
- Recipients receive a ten percent increase in retired pay.
- Those awarded the medal after October 23, 2002, receive a Medal of Honor Flag. The law specified that all 103 living prior recipients as of that date would receive a flag.
- Recipients receive an invitation to all future presidential inaugurations and inaugural balls.
- As with all medals, retired personnel may wear the Medal of Honor on "appropriate" civilian clothing. Regulations specify that recipients of the Medal of Honor are allowed to wear the uniform "at their pleasure" with standard restrictions on political, commercial, or extremist purposes (other former members of the armed forces may do so only at certain ceremonial occasions).
- Forty states offer a special license plate for certain types of vehicles to recipients at little or no cost to the recipient. The states that do not offer Medal of Honor specific license plate offer special license plates for veterans for which recipients may be eligible.
- In 1969, the Nebraska State Legislature amended the Nebraska Hall of Fame statutes "to provide that Nebraskans awarded the Medal of Honor shall be named to the Hall of Fame" and required that the Hall of Fame Commission procure a plaque with the names of the Medal of Honor recipients.

=== Saluting ===
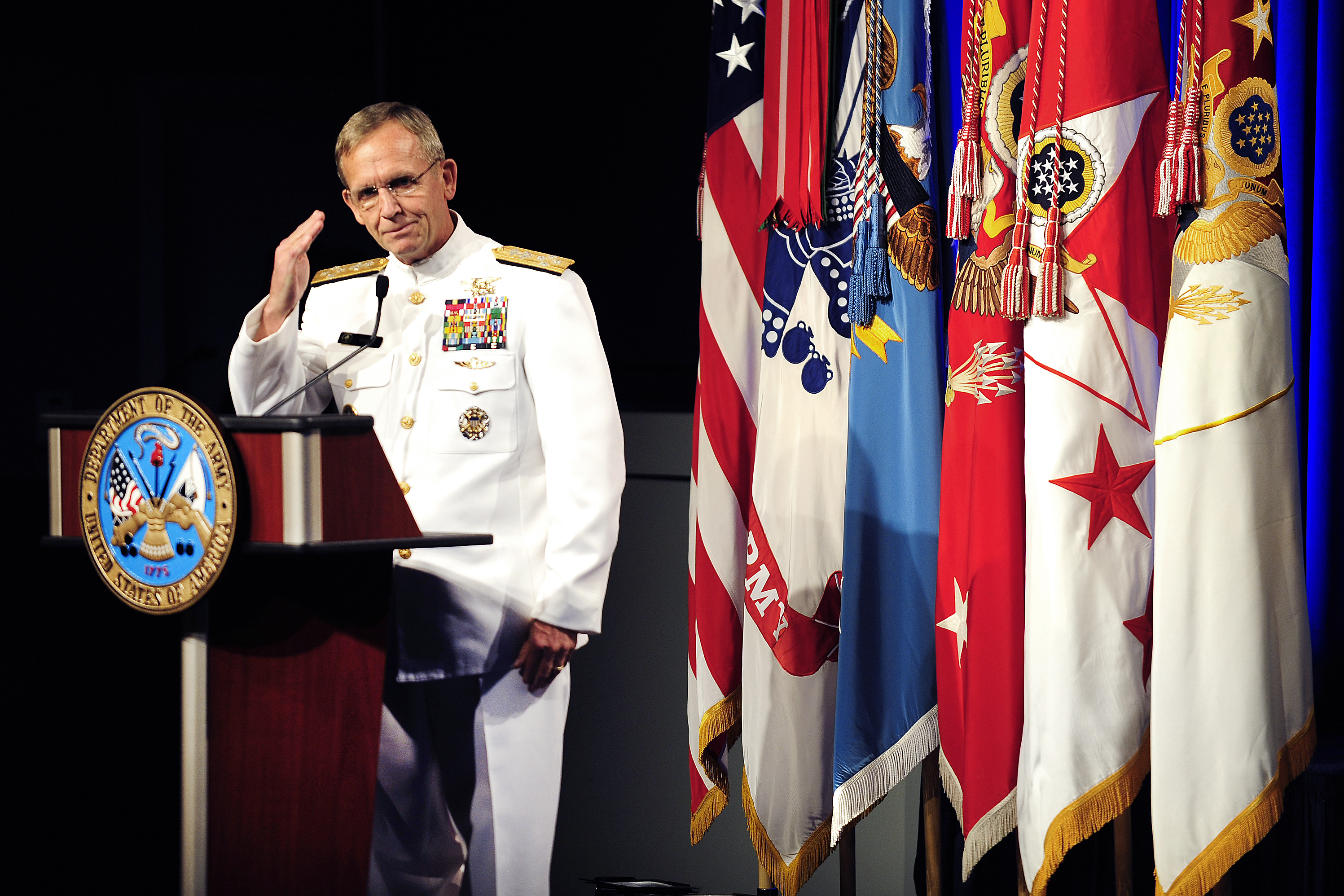
Admiral Eric T. Olson salutes Sergeant First Class Leroy Petry at a ceremony at The Pentagon (July 2011)

Although not required by law or military regulation of all military services, members of the uniformed services are encouraged to render salutes to recipients of the Medal of Honor as a matter of respect and courtesy regardless of rank or status, whether or not they are in uniform. This is one of the few instances where a living member of the military will receive salutes from members of a higher rank. According to paragraph 1.8.1.1 of Air Force Instruction 1-1, the United States Air Force requires that salutes be rendered to Medal of Honor recipients. In 2026, the United States Navy began requiring salutes to be rendered to all recipients, in appropriate circumstances.

== Legal protection ==
=== 1904 ===
The Army redesigned its Medal of Honor, largely a reaction to the copying of the Medal of Honor by various veterans organizations, such as the Grand Army of the Republic. To prevent the making of copies of the medal, Brigadier General George Gillespie, Jr., a Medal of Honor recipient from the Civil War, applied for and obtained a patent for the new design. General Gillespie received the patent on November 22, 1904, and he transferred it the following month to the Secretary of War at the time, William Howard Taft.

=== 1923 ===
Congress passed a statute (the year before the 20-year term of the patent would expire)—which would later be codified at 18 U.S.C. §704—prohibiting the unauthorized wearing, manufacturing, or sale of military medals or decorations. In 1994, Congress amended the statute to permit an enhanced penalty if the offense involved the Medal of Honor.

=== 2006 ===
The Stolen Valor Act of 2005 was enacted. The law amended 18 U.S.C. § 704 to make it a federal criminal offense for a person to deliberately state falsely that he or she had been awarded a military decoration, service medal, or badge. The law also permitted an enhanced penalty for someone who falsely claimed to have been awarded the Medal of Honor.

=== 2012 ===
In the case of United States v. Alvarez, the Supreme Court of the United States held that the Stolen Valor Act of 2005's criminalization of the making of false claims of having been awarded a military medal, decoration, or badge was an unconstitutional violation of the First Amendment's guarantee of free speech. The case involved an elected official in California, Xavier Alvarez, who had falsely stated at a public meeting that he had been awarded the Medal of Honor, even though he had never served in any branch of the armed forces. The Supreme Court's decision did not specifically address the constitutionality of the older portion of the statute which prohibits the unauthorized wearing, manufacturing, or sale of military medals or decorations, since the Alvarez prosecution only involved First Amendment protected speech. Under the law, the unauthorized wearing, manufacturing, or sale of the Medal of Honor is punishable by a fine of up to $100,000 and imprisonment of up to one year.

=== 2013 ===
Given the Supreme Court's ruling, President Barack Obama signed into law the Stolen Valor Act of 2013, making it a federal offense for someone to falsely represent themselves as awardees of medals for valor in order to receive "money, property, or other tangible benefit" (including grants, educational benefits, housing, etc.). False representations about the Medal of Honor or other valor decorations still result in a fine or imprisonment up to one year, or both, but are now narrowly tailored to financial gain rather than protected speech. As of 2017, there were only two reported arrests and prosecutions under the law, leading at least 22 states to enact their own legislation to criminalize stolen valor amid claims that the federal law was virtually unenforced.

== Duplicate medals ==
Medal of Honor recipients may apply in writing to the headquarters of the service branch of the medal awarded for a replacement or display Medal of Honor, ribbon, and appurtenance (Medal of Honor flag) without charge. Primary next of kin may also do the same and have any questions answered in regard to the Medal of Honor that was awarded. This service applies to all military decorations, which can be "issued on a one-time basis and without charge to the recipient."

== Recipients ==
On This Day In History: The Medal of Honor was created in 1862.

- The first Medals of Honor were awarded and presented to six U.S. Army soldiers ("Andrews Raiders") on March 25, 1863, by Secretary of War Edwin Stanton, in his office of the War Department. Private Jacob Parrott, a U.S. Army volunteer from Ohio, became the first Medal of Honor recipient, awarded for his volunteering for and participation in a raid on a Confederate train in Big Shanty, Georgia, on April 12, 1862, during the American Civil War. After the medal presentations, the six decorated soldiers met with President Lincoln in the White House.
- Bernard John Dowling Irwin was the first (chronologically by action) Medal of Honor recipient during the Apache Wars. His actions on February 13, 1861, are the earliest for which the Medal of Honor was awarded.
- The first U.S. Navy sailors were awarded the Medal of Honor on April 3, 1863. 41 sailors received the award, with 17 awards for action during the Battle of Forts Jackson and St. Philip.
- The first marines awarded the Medal of Honor were John F. Mackie and Pinkerton R. Vaughn on July 10, 1863; Mackie for USS Galena on May 15, 1862, and Vaughn for USS Mississippi on March 14, 1863.
- The first, and so far only, Coast Guardsman to be awarded the Medal of Honor was Signalman First Class Douglas Munro. He was posthumously awarded it on May 27, 1943, for evacuating 500 marines under fire on September 27, 1942, during the Battle of Guadalcanal.
- The only woman awarded the Medal of Honor is Mary Edwards Walker, who was a civilian Army acting assistant surgeon during the American Civil War. She received the award in 1865 after the Judge Advocate General of the Army determined that she could be given a retroactive commission or brevet, but Secretary of War Stanton ruled against her in spite of this legal advice. Instead of a commission, President Andrew Johnson directed that "the usual medal of honor for meritorious services be given her." Evidently, Johnson did not know that the award was restricted by law to soldiers, which made the award to a contract surgeon (a civilian) unlawful. This defect later led to the award's revocation in 1917, and then questionable reinstatement by the Army's Board for Correction of Military Records in 1977. The reinstatement is often attributed to President Jimmy Carter, in error.
- The first black recipients of the Medal of Honor were sixteen Army soldiers and sixteen Navy sailors that fought during the Civil War. The first black recipient was Robert Blake, who received the medal on April 16, 1864 for serving as a powder boy on the USS Marblehead. The first Army award was announced on April 6, 1865, to twelve black soldiers from the five regiments of U.S. Colored Troops who fought at New Market Heights outside of Richmond on September 29, 1864. The first action by a black man to eventually earn the Medal of Honor was by William Harvey Carney. He earned the Medal during the Battle of Fort Wagner, but was not presented with it until 1900.
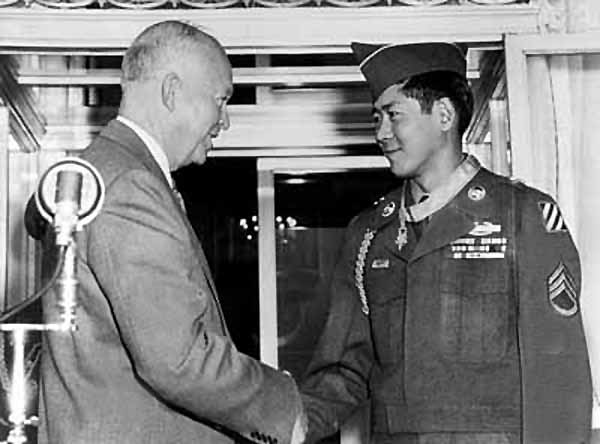
- President Dwight D. Eisenhower congratulates SSG Miyamura after having awarded him the Medal of Honor on October 27, 1953.
  The only Medal of Honor to be classified as "top secret" was awarded to Hiroshi "Hershey" Miyamura for his actions on April 24, 1951, during the Korean War when he was presumed dead. The Medal of Honor, which had not been publicly announced, was classified as top secret for his protection until his release in August 1953.

The 1917 Medal of Honor Board revoked 911 awards, but only 910 names from the Army's Medal of Honor list, including awards to Mary Edwards Walker, William F. "Buffalo Bill" Cody and the first of two awards issued February 10, 1887, to George W. Mindil, who retained his award issued October 25, 1893. None of the 911 impacted recipients were ordered to return their medals, although on the question of whether the recipients could continue to wear their medals, the Judge Advocate General advised the Medal of Honor Board that the Army was not obligated to police the matter. Walker continued to wear her medal until her death, although some authors mistakenly claim that the Army sought its return. Although some sources claim that President Jimmy Carter formally restored her medal posthumously in 1977, this action was actually taken unilaterally by the Army's Board for Correction of Military Records. The Army Board for Correction of Military Records also restored the Medals of Honor of Buffalo Bill and four other civilian scouts in 1989.

- Sixty-one Canadians who served in the United States Armed Forces earned the Medal of Honor, most during the American Civil War. Since 1900, four Canadians have received the medal. The only Canadian-born, naturalized U.S. citizen to receive the medal for heroism during the Vietnam War was Peter C. Lemon.

While the governing statute for the Army's Medal of Honor (10 U.S.C. § 6241), beginning in 1918, explicitly stated that a recipient must be "an officer or enlisted man of the Army", "distinguish himself conspicuously by gallantry and intrepidity at the risk of his life above and beyond the call of duty", and perform an act of valor "in action involving actual conflict with an enemy", exceptions have been made:

- Charles Lindbergh, 1927, civilian pilot, and U.S. Army Air Corps reserve officer. Lindbergh's medal was authorized by a special act of Congress, which effectively waived his ineligibility on the grounds of not being on military duty, not performing an act of gallantry, and not being in action (combat) against an enemy. Lindbergh's award also violated President Coolidge's executive order prohibiting multiple awards for the same action, as he also received a Distinguished Flying Cross for the same transatlantic flight.
- Major General (Retired) Adolphus Greely was awarded the medal in 1935, on his 91st birthday, "for his life of splendid public service." The result of a special act of Congress similar to Lindbergh's, Greely's medal citation did not reference any acts of valor.
- Foreign unknown recipients include five WWI Unknowns: the Belgian Unknown Soldier, the British Unknown Warrior, the French Unknown Soldier, the Italian Unknown Soldier, and the Romanian Unknown Soldier.
- U.S. unknown recipients include one each from four wars: World War I, World War II, Korea, and Vietnam. The Vietnam Unknown was later identified as Air Force First Lieutenant Michael Blassie through the use of DNA identification. Blassie's family asked for his Medal of Honor, but the Department of Defense denied the request in 1998. According to Undersecretary of Defense Rudy de Leon, the medal was awarded symbolically to all Vietnam unknowns, not to Blassie specifically. The action also resulted in clarification of unknown medal awards in the FY2005 defense bill, which expressly stated such medals are "awarded to the member as a representative of the members of the armed forces who died in such war or other armed conflict and whose remains have not been identified, and not to the individual personally."

Awards by conflict
Conflict	Date	Medal count (3,530)	List article
Civil War	1861–1865	1,523	American Civil War Medal of Honor recipients
Indian Wars	1865–1891	426	Medal of Honor recipients for the Indian Wars
Korean Expedition	1871	15	Medal of Honor recipients in the Korean Expedition
Spanish–American War	1898	110	Medal of Honor recipients for the Spanish–American War
Second Samoan Civil War	1899	4	Medal of Honor recipients for the Samoan Civil War
Philippine–American War	1899–1902	86	Philippine–American War Medal of Honor recipients
Boxer Rebellion	1899–1901	59	Medal of Honor recipients for the Boxer Rebellion
Occupation of Veracruz	1914	56	Medal of Honor recipients for Veracruz
United States occupation of Haiti	1915–1934	8	Medal of Honor recipients for Haiti
Dominican Republic Occupation	1916–1924	3	Medal of Honor recipients for the Occupation of the Dominican Republic
World War I	1914–1918	126	Medal of Honor recipients for World War I
Occupation of Nicaragua	1912–1933	2	Medal of Honor recipients for Occupation of Nicaragua
World War II	1939–1945	472	Medal of Honor recipients for World War II
Korean War	1950–1953	146	Korean War Medal of Honor recipients
Vietnam War	1955–1975	268	Medal of Honor recipients for the Vietnam War
USS Liberty incident	1967	1	Medal of Honor recipients for the USS Liberty incident
Battle of Mogadishu	1993	2	Medal of Honor recipients for the Battle of Mogadishu
Iraq War	2003–2011	7	Medal of Honor recipients for the Iraq War
War in Afghanistan	2001–2021	20	Medal of Honor recipients for the War in Afghanistan
Operation Inherent Resolve	2014–present	1	Medal of Honor recipients for Operation Inherent Resolve
Venezuelan intervention	2026	1	Medal of Honor recipients for Venezuelan Intervention
Noncombat	1865–1939	193	Medal of Honor recipients in non-combat incidents
Unknown soldiers	1914–1973	9	Unknown Medal of Honor recipients (4 American and 5 Allies)

Awards by military branch
Army	Navy	Marine Corps	Air Force	Coast Guard	Total
2,461	749	300	19	1	3,530

Note that the number of Air Force recipients does not count recipients from its pre-September 19, 1947, Army-related predecessor organizations. Nevertheless, the Air Force's transfer agreement gave it retroactive jurisdiction over military awards to the date the Air Corps was authorized by statute: Jul. 2, 1926. Thus, were a decoration submitted retroactively for an aviator's actions on or after that date (including a Medal of Honor), it would be processed by the Air Force despite the fact that the Air Force did not yet exist as a separate service.

=== Double recipients ===
Nineteen service members have been awarded the Medal of Honor twice. The first double Medal of Honor recipient was Thomas Custer (brother of George Armstrong Custer) for two separate actions that took place several days apart during the American Civil War.

Five "double recipients" were awarded both the Army's and Navy's Medal of Honor for the same action, with all five of these occurrences taking place during World War I. This was a consequence of the marine recipients serving under Army command, which had been reviewed by the Army's judge advocate general. According to the judge advocate general, the marines were "a party 'of the Army'" since they were detached for service under the Army by presidential directive, and thus were subject to the Army's decoration statutes for that time period. No modern recipients have more than one medal because of laws passed for the Army in 1918, and for the Navy in 1919, which stipulated that "no more than one medal of honor . . . shall be issued to any one person," although subsequent awards were still authorized by issuance of bars or other devices in lieu of the medal itself. The prohibition on wearing multiple medals did not technically apply to the double recipients of WWI because they received Medals of Honor from different services, which meant the same medals were not duplicated and had independent statutory authority. Later, in 1927, President Coolidge issued an executive order that forbade issuing more than one federal decoration for the same action, a policy that continues through the present time. The statutory bar on issuing multiple Medals of Honor was finally repealed in the FY2014 defense bill, at the request of the Office of the Secretary of Defense, meaning that recipients can now be issued more than one medal rather than simply receiving a device for subsequent awards. However, it is still true that no more than one medal may be issued for the same action.

The most Medals of Honor earned by any service member is two. The last living individual to be awarded two Medals of Honor was John J. Kelly, on October 3, 1918; the last individual to receive two Medals of Honor for two different actions was Smedley Butler, in 1914 and 1915. None of the double awardees earned two distinct medals under modern Medal of Honor criteria, although the WWI awardees qualified under substantially modern statutes.

Name	Service	Rank (Note: Rank refers to rank held at time of Medal of Honor action.)	War(s)	Notes
Frank Baldwin	Army	First Lieutenant, Captain	American Civil War, Indian Wars	
Smedley Butler	Marine Corps	Major	Veracruz, Haiti	
John Cooper	Navy	Coxswain	American Civil War	
Louis Cukela	Marine Corps	Sergeant	World War I	Awarded both Navy and Army versions for same action.
Thomas Custer	Army	Second Lieutenant	American Civil War	Battle of Namozine Church on April 3 and Battle of Sayler's Creek on April 6, 1865.
Daniel Daly	Marine Corps	Private, Gunnery Sergeant	Boxer Rebellion, Haiti	
Henry Hogan	Army	First Sergeant	Indian Wars	
Ernest A. Janson	Marine Corps	Gunnery Sergeant	World War I	Both awarded for same action. Received the Army MOH under the name Charles F. Hoffman.
John J. Kelly	Marine Corps	Private	World War I	Both awarded for same action.
John King	Navy	Water tender	Peacetime	1901 and 1909
Matej Kocak	Marine Corps	Sergeant	World War I	Both awarded for same action.
John Lafferty	Navy	Fireman, First Class Fireman	American Civil War, peacetime	
John C. McCloy	Navy	Coxswain, Chief Boatswain	Boxer Rebellion, Veracruz	
Patrick Mullen	Navy	Boatswain's Mate	American Civil War	
John H. Pruitt	Marine Corps	Corporal	World War I	Both awarded for same action.
Robert Sweeney	Navy	Ordinary Seaman	Peacetime	1881 and 1883
Albert Weisbogel	Navy	Captain of the Mizzen Top	Peacetime	1874 and 1876
Louis Williams	Navy	Captain of the Hold	Peacetime	1883 and 1884. Also known as Ludwig Andreas Olsen.
William Wilson	Army	Sergeant	Indian Wars	

=== Related recipients ===
Arthur MacArthur, Jr. and Douglas MacArthur were the first father and son to be awarded the Medal of Honor. The only other such pairing is Theodore Roosevelt, Jr. (awarded in 2001) and Theodore Roosevelt III. Notably, one member in each pair was strongly influenced by political considerations; Douglas MacArthur's medal was approved for service (rather than gallantry) in violation of both law and policy that prohibited such action, and Theodore Roosevelt's medal was approved after members of Congress successfully lobbied the Secretary of the Army to reverse a prior determination that "Theodore Roosevelt's bravery in battle did not rise to the level that would justify the Medal of Honor and, indeed, it did not rise to the level of men who fought in that engagement."

Seven pairs of brothers have received the Medal of Honor:

- James Pond and George F. Pond, in the American Civil War for separate actions. James for actions on 6 October 1863 and George on 15 May 1864.
- George N. Galloway and John Galloway, in the American Civil War for separate actions. George for actions on May 8, 1864 and John for actions on April 7, 1865.
- John and William Black, in the American Civil War. The Blacks are the first brothers to be so honored.
- Charles and Henry Capehart, in the American Civil War, the latter for saving a drowning man while under fire.
- Antoine and Julien Gaujot. The Gaujots also have the unique distinction of receiving their medals for actions in separate conflicts, Antoine in the Philippine–American War and Julien when he crossed the Mexican border to rescue Mexicans and Americans in a Mexican Revolution skirmish.
- Harry and Willard Miller, during the same naval action in the Spanish–American War.
- Allen and James Thompson, in the same American Civil War action.

Two other notable pairs of related recipients include two uncle and nephew recipients. Admiral Frank Friday Fletcher (rear admiral at the time of award) and his nephew, Admiral Frank Jack Fletcher (lieutenant at the time of award), both awarded for actions during the United States occupation of Veracruz. Guy W. S. Castle for actions during the U.S. occupation of Veracruz, and his nephew Frederick Walker Castle for actions during World War II.

=== Late awards ===
Since 1979, 86 late Medal of Honor awards have been presented for actions from the Civil War to the Vietnam War. In addition, five recipients whose names were included on the Army's medal revocations in 1917 had their awards restored. A 1993 study commissioned by the U.S. Army investigated "racial disparity" in the awarding of medals. At the time, no Medals of Honor had been awarded to U.S. soldiers of African descent who served in World War II. After an exhaustive review, the study recommended that ten Distinguished Service Cross recipients be awarded the Medal of Honor. On January 13, 1997, President Bill Clinton presented the Medal of Honor to seven of these World War II veterans, six of them posthumously and one to former Second Lieutenant Vernon Baker.

In 1998, a similar study of Asian Americans resulted in Clinton presenting 22 Medals of Honor in 2000. This was following a historical review conducted by a team of historians headed by Jim McNaughton at the Defense Language Institute Foreign Language Center, located in the Presidio of Monterey, California. The review ultimately forwarded at least 47 cases of Distinguished Service Crosses for potential upgrade, as well as one Silver Star. Twenty of the resulting medals went to U.S. soldiers of Japanese descent of the 442nd Regimental Combat Team (442nd RCT) who served in the European Theater of Operations during World War II. One of these Medal of Honor recipients was Senator Daniel Inouye, a former U.S. Army officer in the 442nd RCT.

In 2005, President George W. Bush presented the Medal of Honor to Tibor Rubin, a Hungarian-born American Jew who was a Holocaust survivor of World War II and enlisted U.S. infantryman and prisoner of war in the Korean War, whom many believed to have been overlooked because of his religion.

On April 11, 2013, President Obama presented the Medal of Honor posthumously to Army chaplain Captain Emil Kapaun for his actions as a prisoner of war during the Korean War. This follows other awards to Army Sergeant Leslie H. Sabo, Jr. for conspicuous gallantry in action on May 10, 1970, near Se San, Cambodia, during the Vietnam War and to Army Private First Class Henry Svehla and Army Private First Class Anthony T. Kahoʻohanohano for their heroic actions during the Korean War.

As a result of a congressionally mandated review to ensure brave acts were not overlooked due to prejudice or discrimination, on March 18, 2014, President Obama upgraded Distinguished Service Crosses to Medals of Honor for 24 Hispanic, Jewish and black individuals—the "Valor 24"—for their actions in World War II, the Korean War and the Vietnam War. Three were still living at the time of the ceremony.

In 2010 and again in 2014, Congress directed the Department of Defense to "survey military leaders . . . to the lowest level of command to determine if there is a trend of downgrading awards . . . for medals related to acts of valor and gallantry," and also to "review the Medal of Honor process to ensure that the nomination process, valor requirements, and timeliness of the process do not unfairly penalize service members." This ultimately resulted in a review of all post 9/11 valor awards, several of which resulted in Medals of Honor.

Another historical review for World War I medals that may have been tainted by discrimination was authorized in the FY2021 National Defense Authorization Act. Conducted under the George S. Rob Centre at Park University, the review is still ongoing but has already identified some 200 medals for potential upgrade.

== 27th Maine and other revoked awards ==
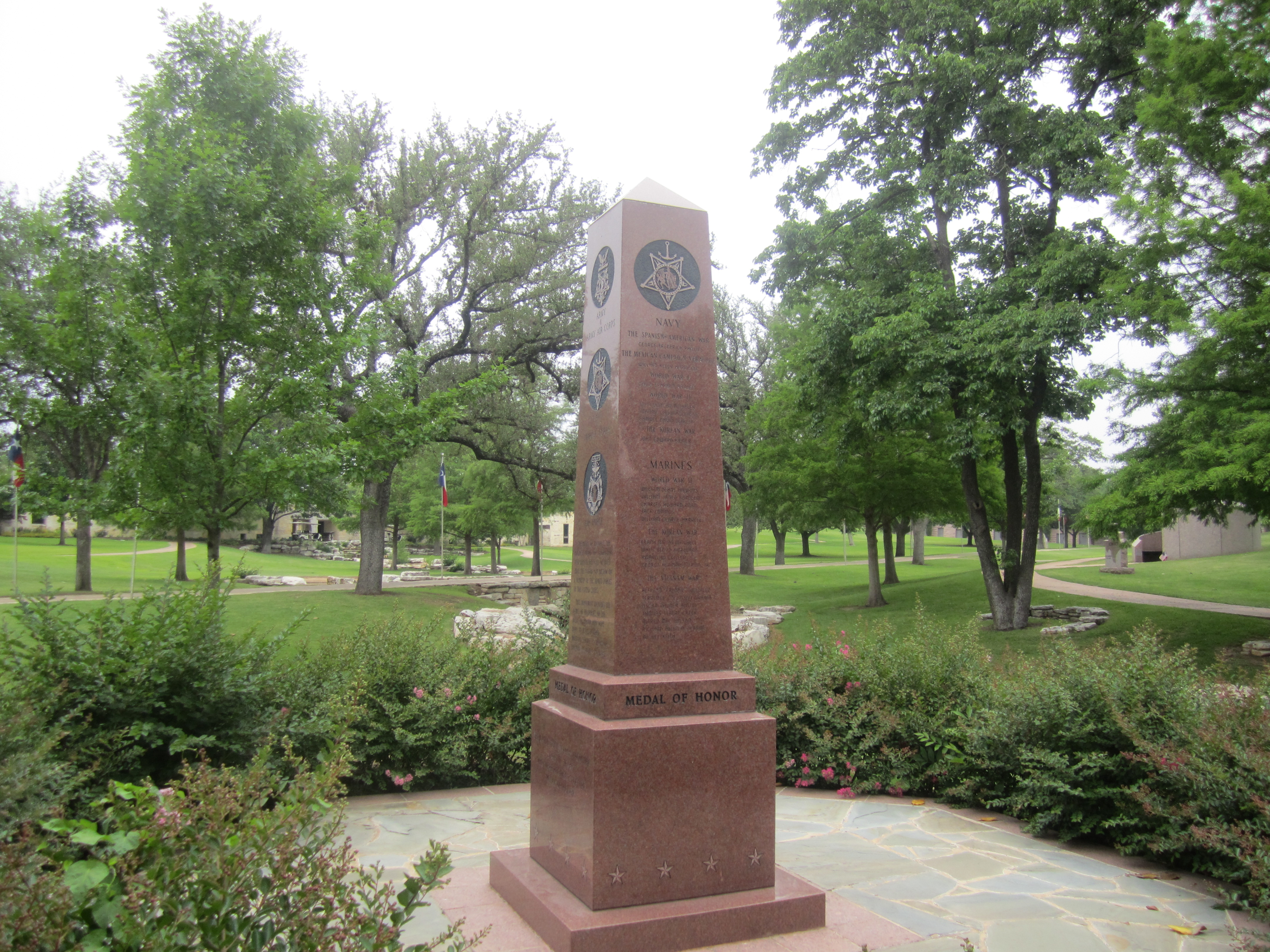
A Medal of Honor monument at the Texas State Cemetery in Austin, Texas

During the Civil War, Secretary of War Edwin M. Stanton promised a Medal of Honor to every man in the 27th Maine Volunteer Infantry Regiment who extended his enlistment beyond his separation date. The Battle of Gettysburg was imminent, and approximately 300 men of the regiment volunteered to serve until the battle was resolved. The remaining men returned to Maine, and with the Union victory at Gettysburg the volunteers with extended enlistments soon followed. They arrived back in Maine in time to be discharged with the men who had returned earlier. Since there seemed to be no official list of the extended volunteers, the War Department exacerbated the situation by forwarding 864 medals to the commanding officer of the regiment. The commanding officer only issued the medals to the volunteers who stayed behind and retained the others on the grounds that, if he returned the remainder to the War Department, the War Department would try to reissue the medals.

In 1916, a board of five Army generals on the retired list convened under act of law to review every Army Medal of Honor awarded. The board was to report on any Medals of Honor awarded or issued "for any cause other than distinguished conduct by an officer or enlisted man in action involving actual conflict with an enemy." The board, led by Nelson A. Miles, identified 911 awards for causes other than distinguished conduct. This included the 864 medals awarded to members of the 27th Maine regiment; 29 servicemen who served as Abraham Lincoln's funeral guard; six civilians, including Mary Edwards Walker and Buffalo Bill Cody; and 12 others. Walker's medal was restored by the Army Board for Correction of Military Records in 1977, an action that is often erroneously attributed to President Jimmy Carter. Cody and four other civilian scouts who rendered distinguished service in action, and who were therefore considered by the board to have fully earned their medals, also had their medals restored by the Army Board for Correction of Military Records in 1989. The report issued by the Medal of Honor review board in 1917 was reviewed by the Judge Advocate General, who also advised that the War Department should not seek the return of the revoked medals from the recipients identified by the board. In the case of recipients who continued to wear the medal, the War Department was advised to take no action to enforce the statute.

== See also ==
- Medal of Honor Day
- List of Medal of Honor recipients
- Medal of Honor Memorials
  - Medal of Honor Memorial (Indianapolis)
  - African-American Medal of Honor Recipients Memorial
  - Kentucky Medal of Honor Memorial
  - Texas Medal of Honor Memorial
- Distinguished Intelligence Cross
- Home of the Heroes, a recognition of Pueblo, Colorado, for being the hometown of four Medal of Honor recipients
- Merchant Marine Distinguished Service Medal
- Military awards and decorations
- National Medal of Honor Museum
