= George Hollat =

Medal of Honor recipient who sailed for the Union Navy in the American Civil War

- Civil War era Navy Medal of Honor
- Born: April 11, 1845; London, England
- Died: January 26, 1912 (aged 66–67); Cleveland, Ohio
- Military career
- Allegiance: United States
- Branch: United States Navy
- Rank: Third Class Boy
- Unit: USS Varuna
- Conflicts: American Civil War • Battle of Forts Jackson and St. Philip
- Awards: Medal of Honor

George Hollat (April 11, 1845 – January 26, 1912) was a Union Navy sailor in the American Civil War and a recipient of the U.S. military's highest decoration, the Medal of Honor, for his actions at the Battle of Forts Jackson and St. Philip.

Born in 1846, Hollat was living in New York when he joined the Navy. He served during the Civil War as a third class boy on the USS Varuna. At the Battle of Forts Jackson and St. Philip near New Orleans on April 24, 1862, Varuna was rammed twice by the Confederate steamer CSS Governor Moore (formerly known as the Charles Morgan) and eventually sunk. Hollat "remained steadfast and courageous at his battle station" throughout the close-range fight. For this action, he was awarded the Medal of Honor a year later on April 3, 1863, however his medal remained unclaimed and in the possession of the Department of the Navy as of 1898.

Hollat's official Medal of Honor citation reads:

Hollat served as third class boy on board the U.S.S. Varuna during an attack on Forts Jackson and St. Philip, 24 April 1862. He rendered gallant service through the perilous action and remained steadfast and courageous at his battle station despite extremely heavy fire and the ramming of the Varuna by the rebel ship Morgan, continuing his efforts until his ship, repeatedly holed and fatally damaged, was beached and sunk.
