= Henry Svehla =

United States Army Medal of Honor recipient

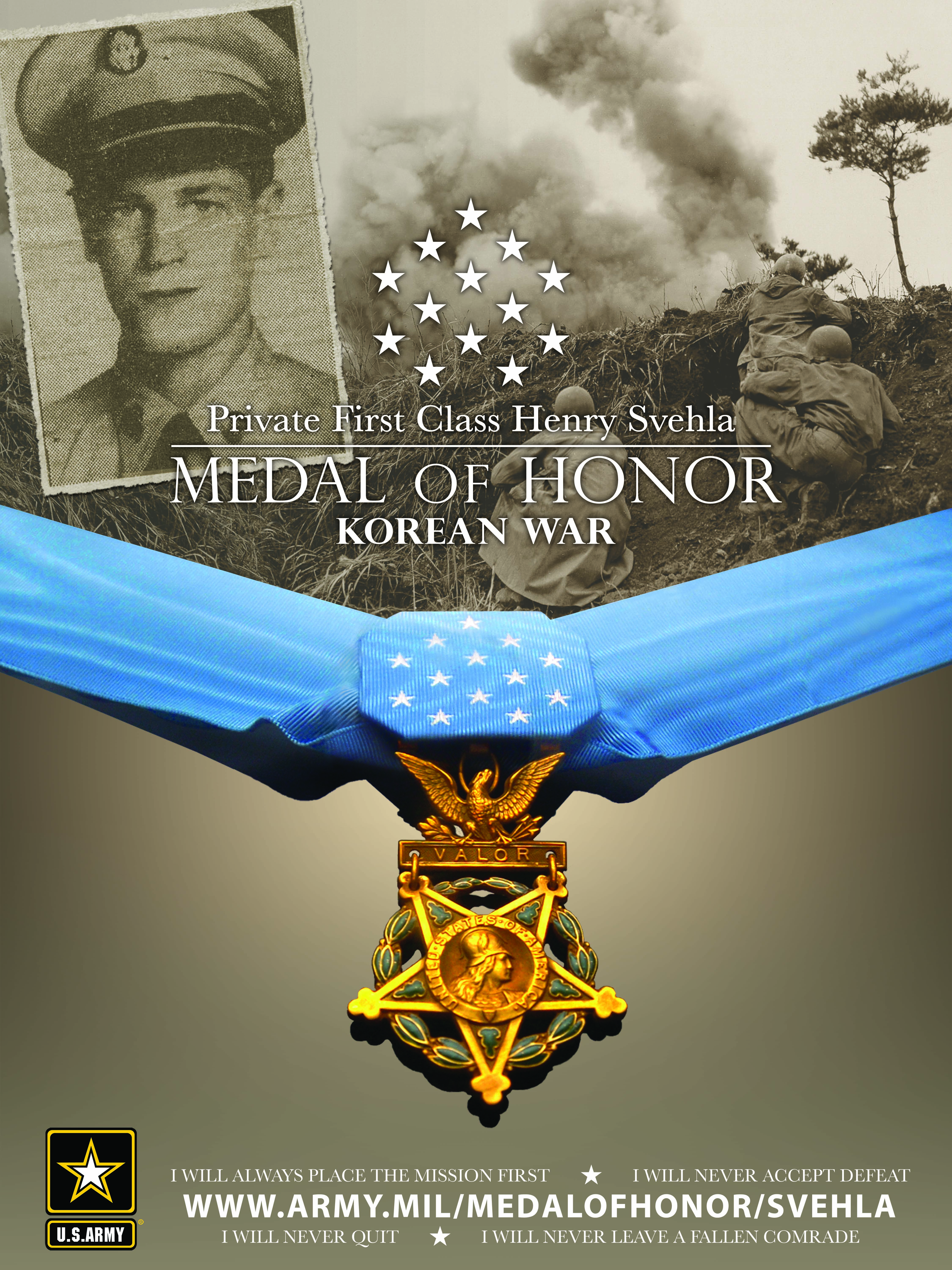
- Medal of Honor honoring Henry Svehla
- Born: October 30, 1932; Newark, New Jersey, US
- Died: June 12, 1952 (aged 19); Korea
- Burial place: remains never recovered; he is memorialized at the National Memorial Cemetery of the Pacific, Honolulu, Hawaii, the National Korean War Veterans Memorial, Washington, DC and has a memorial headstone in Arlington National Cemetery, Arlington, Virginia
- Military career
- Allegiance: United States
- Branch: United States Army
- Service years: 1951–1952
- Rank: Private first class
- Units: 2nd Battalion, 32nd Infantry Regiment, 7th Infantry Division
- Conflicts: Korean War †
- Awards: Medal of Honor; Purple Heart

Henry Svehla (October 30, 1932 – June 12, 1952) was a United States Army soldier. On May 2, 2011, Svehla was posthumously awarded the United States military's highest decoration, the Medal of Honor, for his actions in the Korean War. Previously he had been awarded the Distinguished Service Cross.

Svehla joined the Army in 1951. By June 12, 1952, Svehla was a private first class serving in Korea as a rifleman with Company F, 32nd Infantry Regiment, 7th Infantry Division. On that day, his platoon came under heavy fire and he charged forward to attack the enemy. When a grenade landed amidst his group, he smothered the blast with his body in order to protect those around him. He was killed in the explosion. His remains have never been recovered.

For these actions, Svehla was awarded the Medal of Honor by President Barack Obama on May 2 during a White House ceremony. His sisters Dorothy Mathews and Sylvia Svehla accepted the medal on his behalf. Also receiving a Medal of Honor at the ceremony was the family of Private First Class Anthony T. Kahoʻohanohano, a fellow 7th Infantry Division soldier killed in the Korean War.

A White House press release describes Svehla's actions:

Coming under heavy fire and with his platoon's attack beginning to falter, Private First Class Svehla leapt to his feet and charged the enemy positions, firing his weapon and throwing grenades as he advanced. Disregarding his own safety, he destroyed enemy positions and inflicted heavy casualties. When an enemy grenade landed among a group of his comrades, without hesitation and undoubtedly aware of the extreme danger, he threw himself on the grenade.

== Medal of Honor citation ==
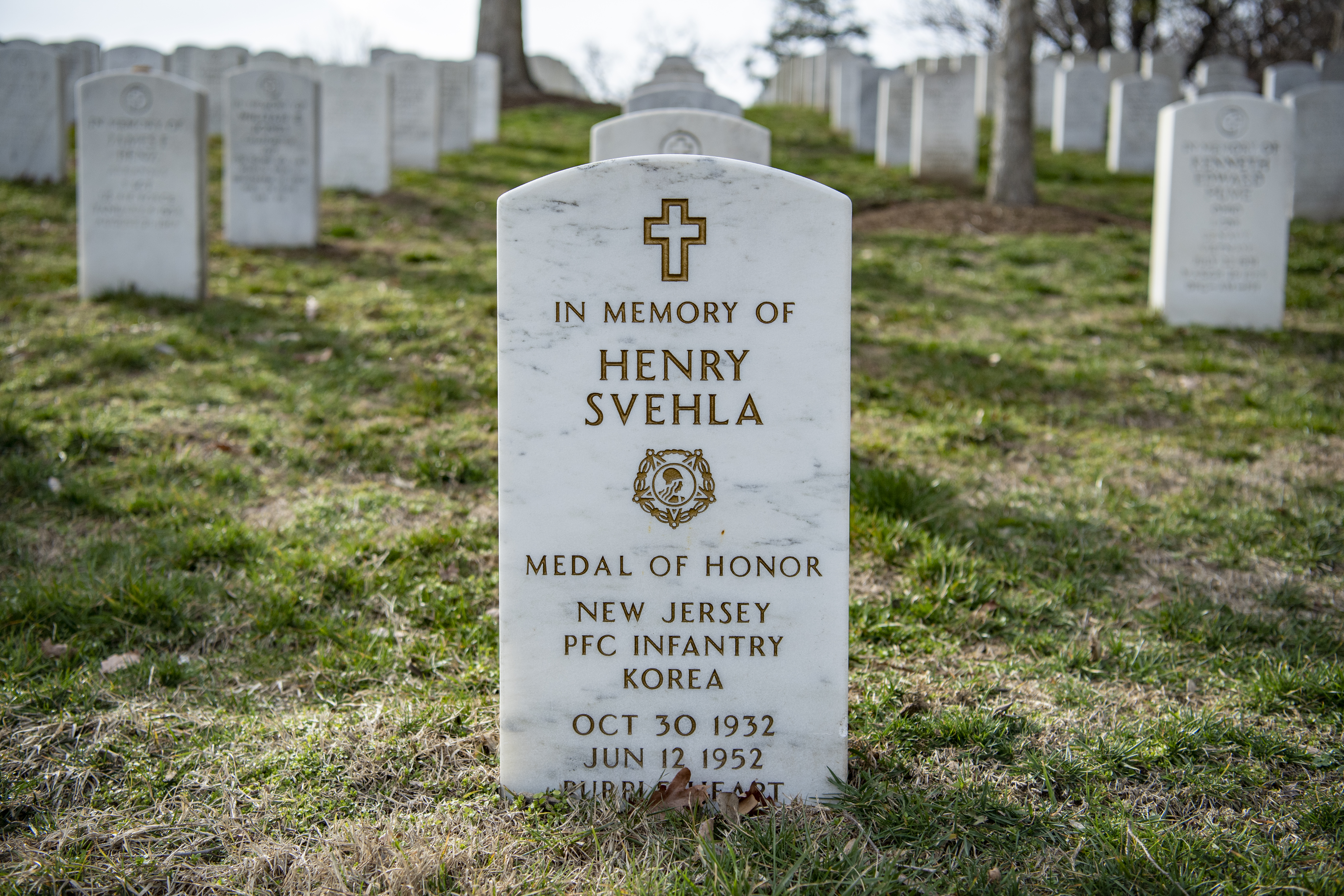
Memorial marker at Arlington National Cemetery

The President of the United States of America, in the name of Congress, takes pleasure in presenting the Medal of Honor to (Posthumously) to Private First Class Henry Svehla (ASN: RA-21748254), United States Army, for extraordinary heroism in connection with military operations against an armed enemy of the United Nations while serving with Company F, 2d Battalion, 32d Infantry Regiment, 7th Infantry Division. Private First Class Svehla distinguished himself by extraordinary heroism in action against enemy aggressor forces at Pyongony, Korea, on 12 June 1952. That afternoon, while Private First Class Svehla and his platoon were patrolling a strategic hill to determine enemy strength and positions, they were subjected to intense enemy automatic weapons and small arms fire at the top of the hill. Coming under heavy fire, the platoon's attack began to falter. Realizing the success of mission and the safety of the remaining troops were in peril, Private First Class Svehla leapt to his feet and charged the enemy positions, firing his weapon and throwing grenades as he advanced. In the face of this courage and determination, the platoon rallied to attack with renewed vigor. Private First Class Svehla, utterly disregarding his own safety, destroyed enemy positions and inflicted heavy casualties, when suddenly, fragments from a mortar round exploding nearby seriously wounded him in the face. Despite his wounds, Private First Class Svehla refused medical treatment and continued to lead the attack. When an enemy grenade landed among a group of his comrades, Private First Class Svehla, without hesitation and undoubtedly aware of extreme danger, threw himself upon the grenade. During this action, Private First Class Svehla was mortally wounded. Private First Class Svehla's extraordinary heroism and selflessness at the cost of his own life, above and beyond the call of duty, are in keeping with the highest traditions of the military service and reflect great credit upon himself, his unit and the United States Army.

Action Date: June 12, 1952

Service: Army

Rank: Private First Class

Company: Company F

Battalion: 2d Battalion

Regiment: 32d Infantry Regiment

Division: 7th Infantry Division
