= 125th Pennsylvania Infantry Regiment =

Union Army infantry regiment

125th Pennsylvania Infantry
- Pennsylvania flag
- Active: August 16, 1862 – May 18, 1863
- Country: United States
- Allegiance: Union
- Branch: Infantry
- Motto: In God We Trust
- Equipment: 1861 Springfield Musket
- Engagements: American Civil War: Battle of Antietam; Battle of Chancellorsville

Commanders
- Notable commanders: Colonel Jacob C. Higgins

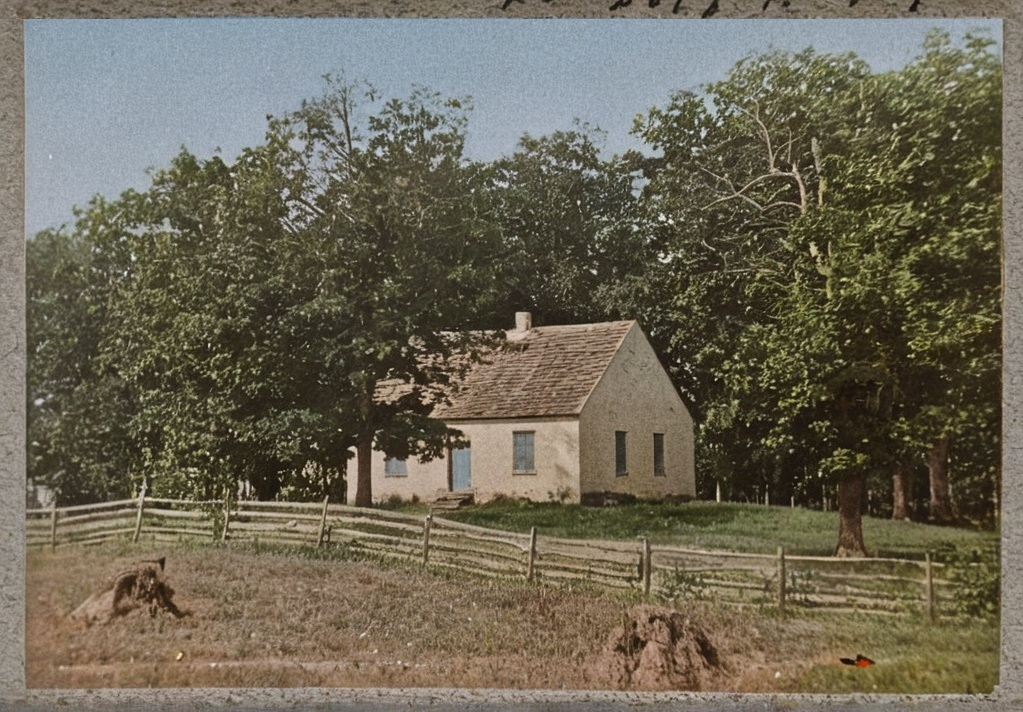
The 125th PA was ordered to “Advance into [the West Woods] and hold them at all hazards” without support on either flank. (Note: ’’At all hazards’’ implies, until 100% casualties are received. Carrying 60 rounds and firing at a rate of 3 shots per minute, a Civil War infantryman could become defenseless in 20 minutes. A defenseless soldier is more useful in retreat than over-run and captured by the enemy.) (Note: A few hours earlier, General Mansfield had felt certain that the new regiments within his command, such as the 125th PA, were certain to run away from duty at their first opportunity.) Deep in these woods, they engaged MG Stonewall Jackson's command, which twice requested reinforcement from MG Longstreet.

Union troops charge past the Dunker Church at the Battle of Antietam

The 125th Pennsylvania Infantry volunteered during the American Civil War and served a 9-month term from August 1862 to May 1863. It selected the motto In God We Trust. The Regiment fought at the Battle of Antietam under the leadership of Colonel Jacob C. Higgins less than six weeks after being recruited in Blair, Cambria and Huntingdon Counties. The Regiment was noted for its charge through the East Woods, along the Great Cornfield, down Smoketown Road, past the Dunker Church, and into the West Woods. While in formation beyond the Dunker Church in an 'overextended' position, the Regiment repulsed four counterattacks at a price of 229 casualties (33% of engaged) within 20 minutes. A fifth, heavily reinforced Confederate counterattack forced a retreat with a desperate struggle to retain the Regimental colors. Two weeks before the end of their enlistment, the 125th Pennsylvania also occupied the perimeter of Chancellorsville, Virginia, during the Battle of Chancellorsville.

== Composition ==
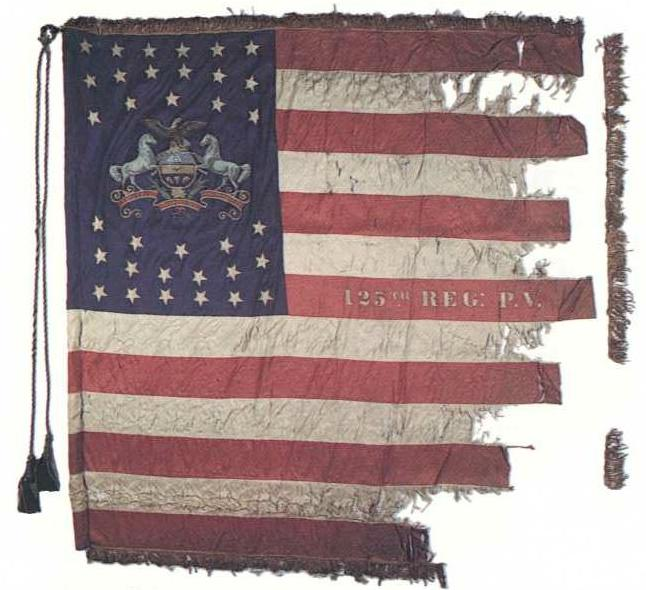
One month after Antietam, the 125th received this official Color from the Commonwealth.

As the Civil War extended into its second year, President Abraham Lincoln appealed nationally for 300,000 additional men on July 1, 1862. In response on July 21, Governor A. G. Curtin called for 21 new regiments from the Commonwealth of Pennsylvania with nine-month enlistments. Four regiments were expected from Blair and Huntingdon Counties, and the 125th Regiment of Pennsylvania Volunteers was recruited as ten companies from late July through early August.

Company	Primary Location of Recruitment, County	Earliest Captain
A	Tyrone, Blair	Francis M. Bell
B	Williamsburg, Blair	Ulyses L. Hewit
C	Huntingdon, Huntingdon, Also known as the "Huntingdon Bible Company".	William W. Wallace, coiner, circa August 1862, of motto "In God We Trust".
D	Altoona, Blair	Christian Hostetter
E	East Freedom, Blair	William McGraw
F	Broad Top Region, Huntingdon	John J. Lawrence
G	Hollidaysburg, Blair	John McKeage
H	Huntingdon, Huntingdon	Henry H. Gregg
I	Huntingdon, Huntingdon	William F. Thomas
K	Altoona, Blair (with approximately half from Cambria County)	Joseph W. Gardner

They came from all walks of life, namely, elected official, professional, businessman, mechanic, farmer or day laborer, and the great majority had no prior military experience. Although the draft would come to Pennsylvania in September, the members of the 125th enlisted earlier and primarily for "patriotic motives".

== Campaigns ==
Battle of Antietam (1st Div, 1st Brigade)
Mud March (1st Div, 2nd Brigade)
Battle of Chancellorsville (2nd Div, 2nd Brigade)

== Battle of Antietam ==
After mustering at Harrisburg, the regiment was assigned to the 1st Brigade, 1st Division, XII Corps in the Army of the Potomac while they trained at Washington, D.C. They marched from Washington to Frederick to Sharpsburg in response to the Confederate Army's crossing of the Potomac River into Maryland. Less than six weeks after mustering, with a minimum of training, and without combat experience they entered the battle on the morning of September 17, 1862.

As the fighting effectiveness of General Hooker's First Corps waned, the Twelfth Corps marched into battle under the command of General Joseph K. F. Mansfield. Certain that the five new regiments of Williams' First Division would run away if deployed in line of battle, Mansfield ordered the First Brigade to lead in a tight formation known as close column of companies. This deterrent to flight transformed the massed troops into an ideal artillery target. As shot and shell began to fly over and drop nearby, a single strike could have killed dozens of men.

After the regiment deployed into an inverted and prone line of battle, Captain Gardner of Company K noticed that there was something wrong with a mounted General Mansfield as he returned from a forward reconnaissance position. He ordered Sergeant John Coho and Private Samuel Edmiston (Note: Due their own illiteracy, sincere attempts at phonetic spelling by others, and one's peculiar pronunciation (Kə-hō’), these surnames are inconsistently rendered as Kehoe, Caho, Kho, Kahoe, Edmundson, Edmonson & Edmanton in the regiment's history. As stated here, the spellings are consistent with their headstones and pension filings on Findagrave.) to Mansfield's assistance, and his men were joined by Private E.S. Rudy of Company H and two men from a nearby regiment. The five saw the General was seriously wounded, helped him from his horse, lifted him onto their reversed muskets, carried him on this improvised chair to safety in the rear, and turned him over to a surgeon and team of stretcher bearers before they returned to duty.

After a delay for re-organization of the Corps command, the 125th Pennsylvania moved forward to support Monroe's First Rhode Island Battery (I Corps, 1 Div) near the intersection of Smoketown Road and Mumma Farm Lane at about 8:30. They were then detached from the XII Corps, 1st Division, and made a stand with Tyndale's and Stainbrook's Brigades of Greene's 2nd Division (XII), forcing the Confederates to temporarily withdraw from the West Woods.

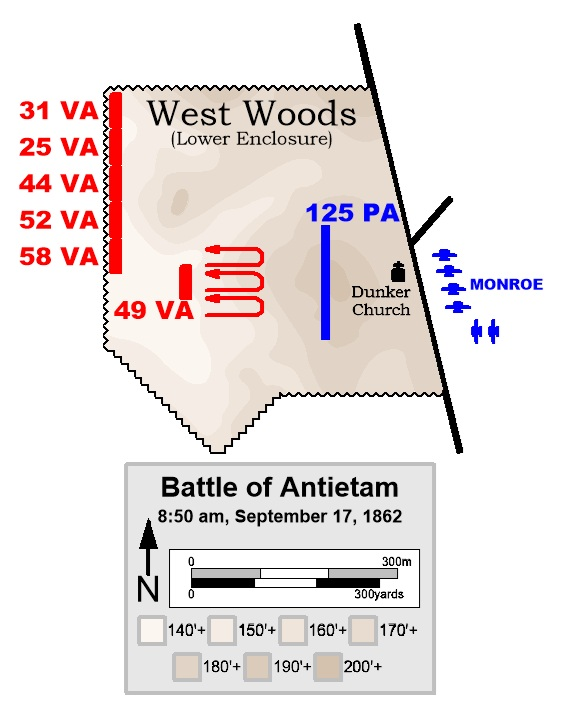
BG Jubal Early directs the 49th VA in a series of attacks against the 125th PA

By 8:50, they remained the lone Union element in the lower enclosure of the West Woods. By about 9:00, as the Confederates counter-attacked, the 34th NY (II,2) arrived to the 125th Pennsylvania's rear, while the 7th MI (II,2) arrived remotely to the 125th Pennsylvania's right, and Sumner's (II Corps) "Disaster in the West Woods" began.

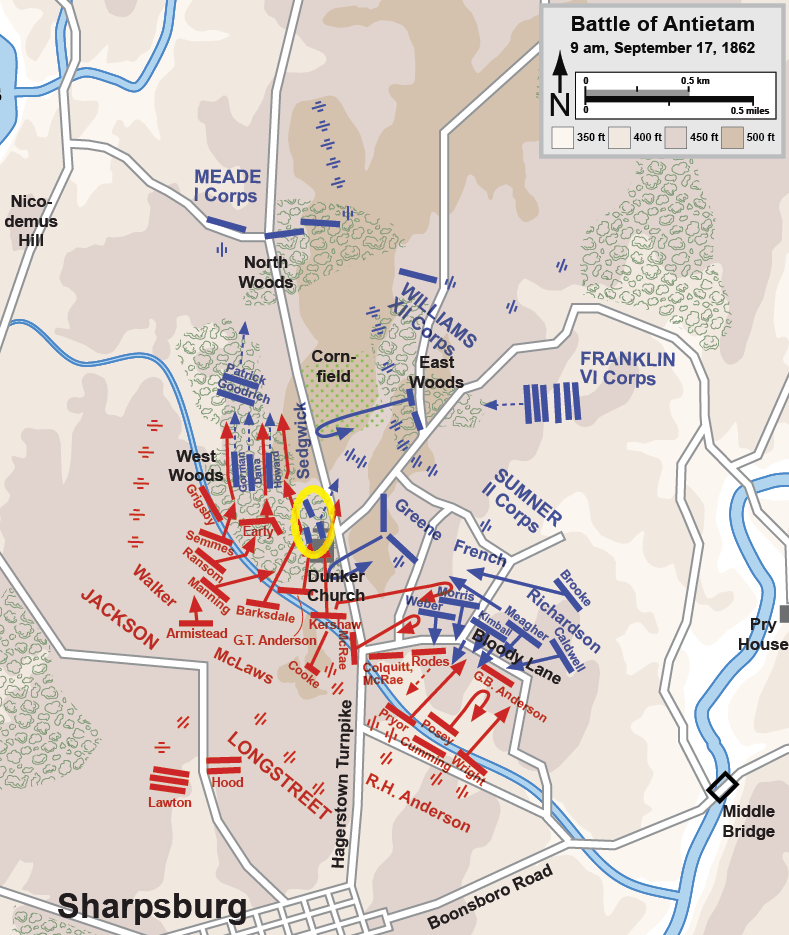
125th PA & 34th NY (inside yellow oval) are counter-attacked shortly after 9 a.m.

Receiving heavy fire from Kershaw's Brigade of McLaw's Division under Longstreet and Early's brigade of Ewell's Division under Stonewall Jackson, the outnumbered 125th Pennsylvania and 34th NY resisted for a few more minutes, during which time they sustained a very high rate of casualties, (Note: The Regiment reports the casualties occurred "within twenty minutes",) and were finally forced to retreat. (Note: In his official post-battle report, Colonel Higgins wrote,"Had I remained in my position two minutes longer I would have lost my whole command".) Sensing a rout, the Confederates followed the retreating regiments and continued to administer fire until Union artillery elements stalled their pursuit. The 125th Pennsylvania remained with Monroe's Battery (now re-positioned near the intersection of Smoketown Road and Mumma Farm Lane) until the end of the Battle.

The commander of II Corps, 2nd Division, 1st Brigade, Brigadier General Willis A. Gorman, observed the performance and fate of the 125th Pennsylvania and commented, "On our left, in the woods, there was a force that told me they belonged to General Crawford's brigade, that were posted there when we first entered it. They fought handsomely until the heavy force of the enemy turned their left, when they retired rapidly, and by this movement in five minutes the enemy's fire came pouring hotly on our left flank and rear."

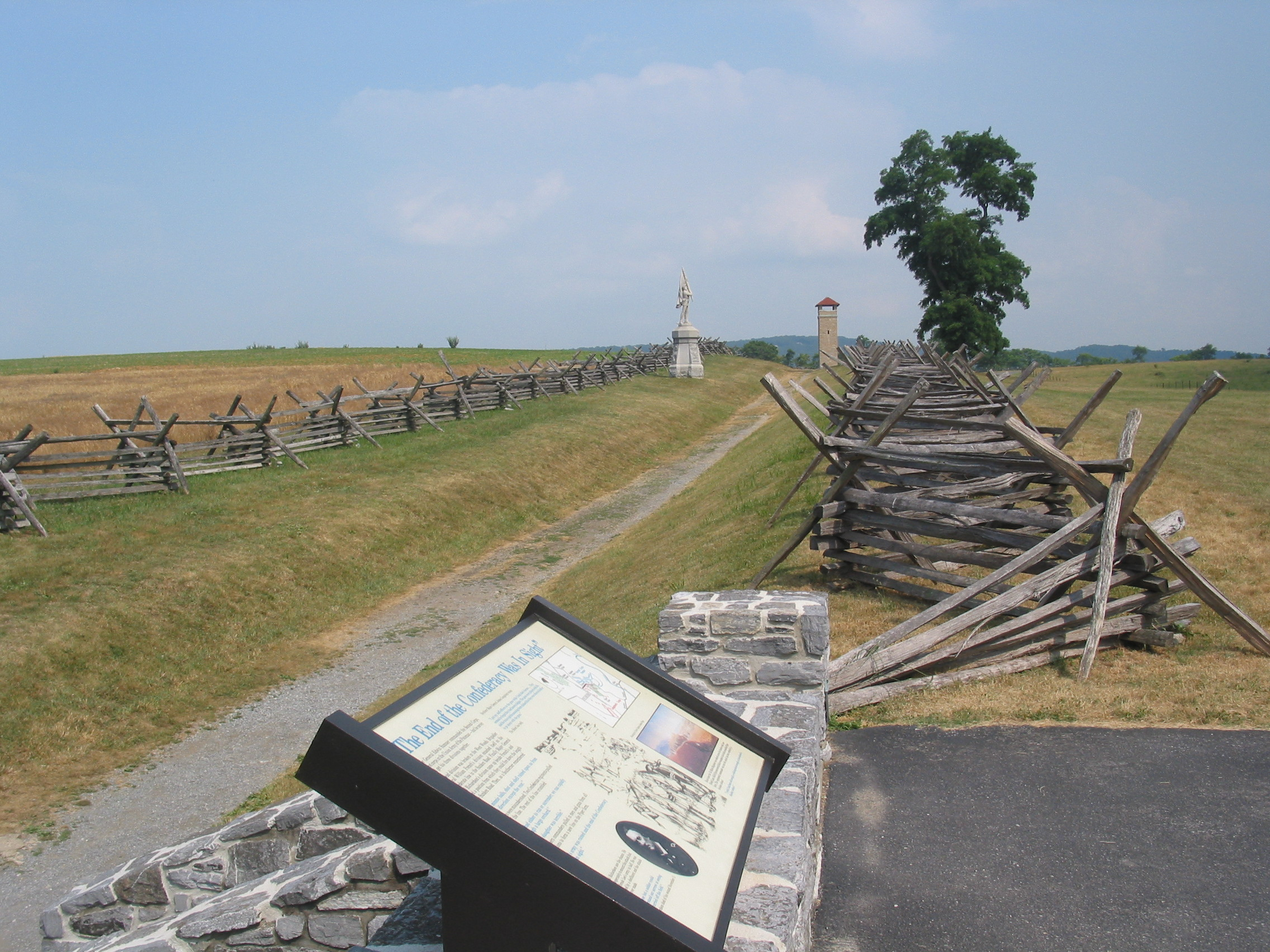
The Sunken Road at Antietam National Battlefield

=== Battle analysis ===
In his memoirs General William T. Sherman decried a systematic problem which the 125th Pennsylvania fell prey to at Antietam, along with many other Regiments in their initial battles:

"The greatest mistake in our civil war was in the mode of recruitment and promotion. When a regiment became reduced by the necessary wear and tear of service, instead of being filled up at the bottom, and the vacancies among the officers filled from the best non-commissioned officers and men, the habit was to raise new regiments, with new colonels, captains, and men, leaving the old and experienced battalions to dwindle away into mere skeleton organizations."

Significantly, Antietam was the last battle fought in the east without the construction of field fortifications, although naturally occurring features, such as the Sunken Road and the quarry holes above the Burnside Bridge, were exploited as rifle pits. Three months after Antietam at Fredericksburg, several of Longstreet's divisions fought behind breastworks, and eight months after Antietam at Chancellorsville, both armies constructed hasty fortifications at every opportunity.

=== Battlefield monument ===
Inscription
Location	Text
Foot of Statue	COLOR SERGEANT; GEORGE A. SIMPSON; KILLED AT ANTIETAM
Front Bronze Plaque	125TH PENNSYLVANIA VOLUNTEER INFANTRY; 1ST BRIGADE 1ST DIVISION; 12TH CORPS; RECRUITED IN BLAR; HUNTINGDON AND CAMBRIA; COUNTIES PENNA.
Left Side Bronze Plaque	MOVED AT EARLY DAWN FROM BIVOUAC; ON FARM OF GEORGE LINE TO EAST WOODS; NEAR POINT WHERE GEN. J.K.F. MANSFIELD; WAS MORTALLY WOUNDED FROM THERE TO; SUPPORT MONROE'S FIRST RHODE ISLAND; BATTERY ON SMOKETOWN ROAD THEN TO; WOODS THAT STOOD HERE SEPTEMBER 17; 1862. WAS THE FIRST UNION REGIMENT; THEREIN BEING FAR ADVANCED AND WITHOUT; SUFFICIENT SUPPORT IT WAS OUTFLANKED BY; THE ENEMY AND RETIRED BEHIND BATTERIES; IN FIELD IN REAR AND SUBSEQUENTLY; SAVED THE GUNS OF MONROE'S BATTERY; FROM CAPTURE. REMAINED IN LINE UNTIL; CLOSE OF BATTLE MONUMENT IS NEAR; THE LEFT OF ITS MAIN LINE OF BATTLE. LOSS AT ANTIETAM KILLED AND DIED OF WOUNDS 54; SERIOUSLY WOUNDED 91; SLIGHTLY WOUNDED AND NOT REPORTED 84 [TOTAL] 229

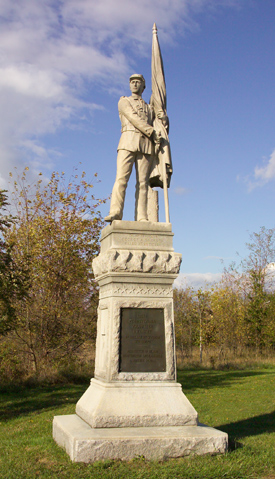
125th Pennsylvania Infantry Monument at Antietam National Battlefield

Color Bearer, Sergeant George A. Simpson: #3953 at Antietam National Cemetery

The 125th Pennsylvania Volunteer Infantry Monument on the Antietam Battlefield was dedicated on September 17, 1904, and is located on Confederate Avenue behind (West) of the Dunker Church. During the 125th Pennsylvania's withdrawal from the indicated position in the West Woods, one of the most dramatic events in the regiment's history began with the regimental color-bearer, Sergeant George Simpson who stands immortalized in granite on top of the monument:

After receiving a bullet to the brain, Simpson fell on the flag and stained it with blood oozing from his right temple. Corporal Eugene Boblitz of Company H grabbed the colors and was soon felled with a leg wound that crippled him for life. Several other soldiers were shot trying to save the colors. (Note: "When [George A. Simpson] fell, the flag was picked up by Uriah Hoffman, of this town, who also received a dangerous wound, and is since reported dead, then by J. Randolph Simpson, who had only partially raised it, when he too was seriously wounded in the breast.") Finally, Sergeant W.W. Greenland (Note: Greenland was wounded in the left ankle but not hors de combat.) snatched up the bloodstained banner and passed it on to Captain William Wallace, (Note: "Captain Wallace, after our colors had fallen five times from as many color bearers, seized our colors and directed the rally of the regiment in the rear of the battery.") (Note: Each of the five (Boblits, Hoffman, J.R. Simpson, Greenland and Wallace) performed meritorious service in defense of the U.S. flag; the action of each is identical, or substantially identical, to one (or more) of seventeen similar action(s) (by Cleveland, Copp, Davis, Dougall, Fleetwood, Holton, Karpeles, Kinsey, Munsell, Noll, Stephen O'Neill, Platt, Ratcliff, Smith, Swift, Veale, and/or Wambsgan) which received the Congressional Medal of Honor during the Civil War . However, none of the five received the Honor.) who used it to rally the regiment. About 200 men formed in line, and about 60 gathered around the much-contested colors in protection. In the twenty-first century, there is often much debate over how we treat the flag. In the Civil War, there was none. Many soldiers were willing to give their lives for that flag.

== Mud March ==
By October 26, 1862, the 125th Pennsylvania had been reassigned to the 2nd Brigade, 1st Division (XII Corps) under Brigadier General Thomas L. Kane and newly positioned at Loudon Heights, VA, near Harper's Ferry, for extended drilling. Departing on December 10, one leg of the 125th Pennsylvania's march toward Fredericksburg was brilliantly fortunate (avoiding Burnside's signature disaster), but the second leg coincided with Burnside's fatal act of futility, the Mud March.

Escorting the XII Corps' train of ammunition wagons from Dumfries (January 20) to Stafford Courthouse (January 24), the 125th Pennsylvania endured the same days of heavy rain which stalled the movement of the Army's Center Grand Division (III and V Corps) toward Banks' Ford. All participants in the Mud March moved very slowly or became stuck fast, and Burnside's aspirations for success at Fredericksburg expired with his command.

== Battle of Chancellorsville ==
=== April 27–30 ===
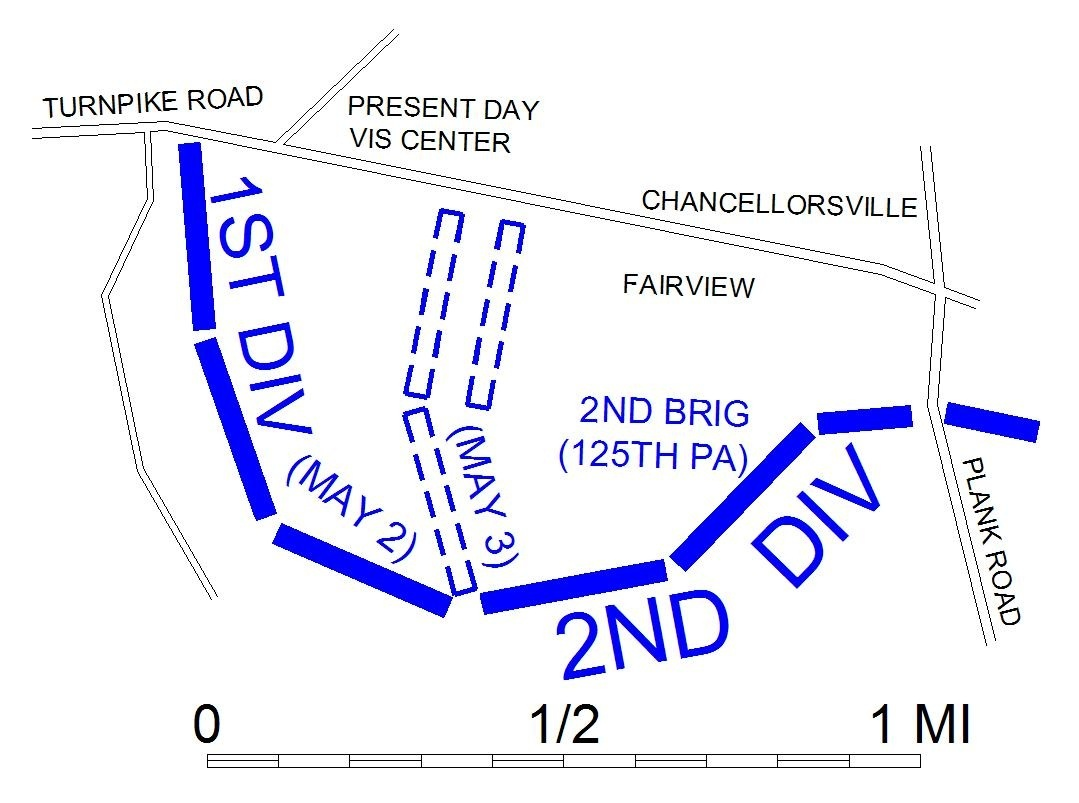
XII Corps trenches are visible in the modern day. They run parallel to Slocum Drive on its southern side within 20'-60' of the modern road.

On April 27–28, the initial three corps of the Army of the Potomac began their march under the leadership of General Henry W. Slocum. They crossed the Rappahannock and Rapidan rivers as planned and began to concentrate on April 30 around the hamlet of Chancellorsville, which was little more than a single large, brick mansion at the junction of the Orange Turnpike and Orange Plank Road.

Upon reaching Chancellorsville on April 30, 1863, General Joseph Hooker deployed the Army of the Potomac in a defensive perimeter around the intersection. Slocum's Twelfth Corps held the center of the Union line, and for three days, his troops entrenched, creating a sturdy earthwork screened by a line of fallen trees known as abatis.

=== May 1 ===
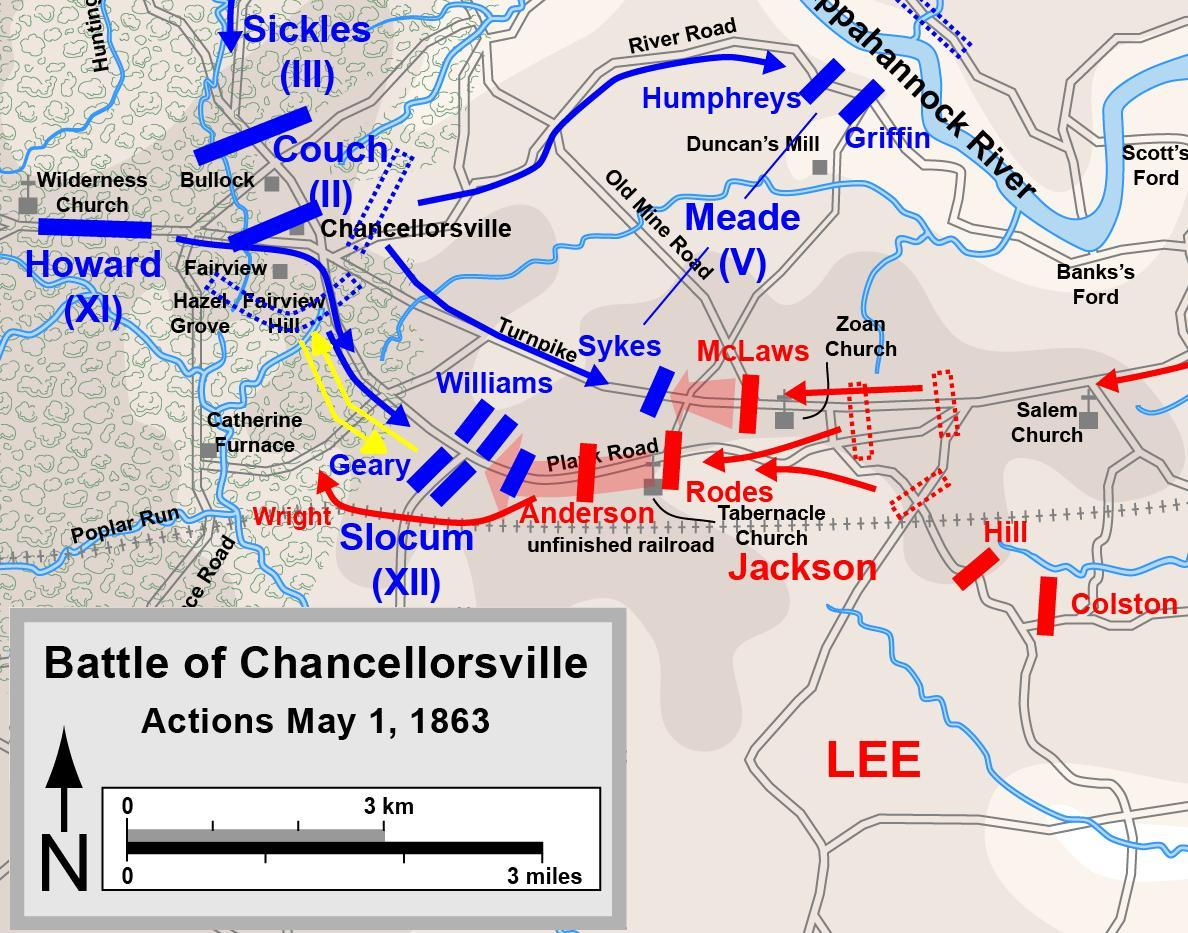
Movements of XII Corps, 2nd Division, on May 1 are indicated by yellow arrows. Map by Hal Jespersen, www.posix.com/CW

While Hooker still maintained the initiative, he commanded a three-pronged eastward thrust. The 1st & 3rd Divisions of the V Corps (Meade) advanced along River Road, the 2nd Division (Sykes) advanced along the Turnpike, and the entirety of the XII Corps (Slocum) advanced along the Plank Road. One mile out, Slocum (XII Corps, including the 125th Pennsylvania) encountered a Confederate picket post and reacted cautiously by deploying his two divisions in line of battle, one Division on each side of Plank Road. Advancing slowly for the next half mile in this formation, the XII Corps had just emerged onto high ground at the Alrich farm, favorable for an offensive, when a Hooker emissary, Colonel Joseph Dicksinson, reported the advance far short of objective and already engaging the enemy at about 1:30 p.m.

Simultaneously, Hooker received unfavorable reports about the progress of Sykes (V-2) (east of Chancellorsville on the Turnpike) and Sedgwick (VI) (east of Fredericksburg). Meade's (V) 1st & 3rd Divisions were advancing unimpeded toward a strategic imperative, occupation of Bank's Ford on the Rappahannock River; nonetheless, Hooker called a halt to all operations and ordered a retreat into defensive positions around Chancellorsville. Thereby, the initiative had been lost for the remainder of the battle.

=== May 2 ===
Between noon and 2 p.m., an armed, westward-moving force became visible and audible to the 125th Pennsylvania's 2nd Division. Private Hicks noted, "From this force we could hear an occasional command, 'Close up,' 'Steady, men,' and like words, and now and then we could catch glimpses of the gray-clothed ranks moving with steady steps, with arms at right shoulder and paying no attention either to us or to our skirmish line in front". The degree of subterfuge associated with the movement was noted by Captain Wallace:

During a suspicious lull in operations, a field officer near me, training his glass on a distant woods, drew my attention to a column of the enemy moving eastward in front of that woods. It was apparently a large force, but as we kept watching it, we were surprised by the occasional reappearance of an officer on a white horse. In each instance he would emerge from our right and disappear on our left, and as it was the same officer, we found that we were witnessing a bit of war strategy, and that a small force was circling many times around that woods to convey the impression that it was an army change of base in one direction, while in reality it was moving the other way.

Following the failure of the Union command to recognize and respond to General Thomas J. Jackson's flanking movement and the subsequent attack, the entire XII Corps attempted to rally the panic-stricken fugitives of the XI Corps, but they would not stop until they were either captured or reached the Rappahannock River. Ultimately, intense night-fighting, especially artillery from Hazel Grove, stemmed the attack, but the 125th Pennsylvania, along with the most of their 2nd Division, was not involved.

=== May 3 ===
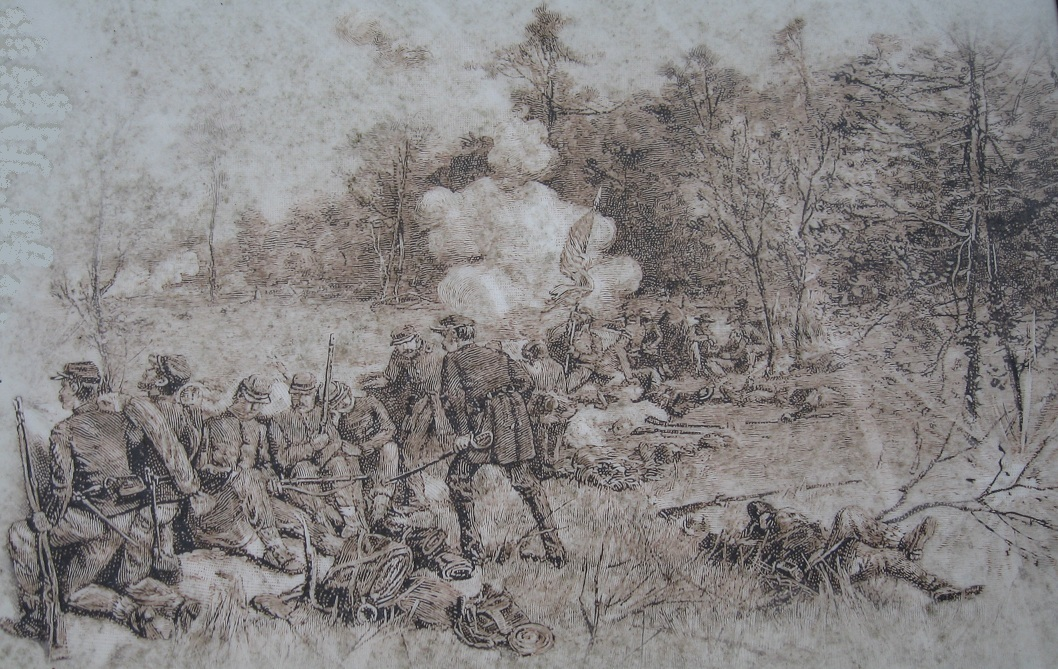
The 125th Pennsylvania fights along the XII Corps, 2nd Division, trench line on May 3, 1863

For two days of battle the Confederates did not test Slocum's position, but starting at 5:30 a.m. on May 3, Lee ordered a broad assault. While Virginians led by General William Mahone attacked the 2nd Division of the XII Corps, Confederate artillery on the Orange Plank Road and at Hazel Grove sent shells screeching into Slocum's line from the rear. The XII Corps gamely held its ground, but as the hours passed, its supply of ammunition ran low. At 9 a.m., Slocum ordered a retreat, and by 10a.m., fighting had essentially ceased with the Confederates in possession of Chancellorsville.

=== Battle analysis ===
Constructing effective breastworks near the Chancellor Mansion and Tavern, the 125th Pennsylvania's Regimental losses were limited (5 killed, 12 wounded, and 10 captured). On May 2, Stonewall Jackson's famous 'Flanking Maneuver' avoided the trap of breastworks placed by the III, XI and XII Corps and led to an attack on the XI Corps' rear.

The fiercest fighting of the Chancellorsville Campaign occurred on May 3, including action at Salem Church and Fredericksburg, and produced the second bloodiest day of the Civil War. The smaller Confederate Army (60,892 CS men vs. 133,868 US men) experienced a significantly higher rate of casualties (22% CS vs. 13% US) than the enemy during General Robert E. Lee's 'Perfect Battle'.

== Muster out and after ==
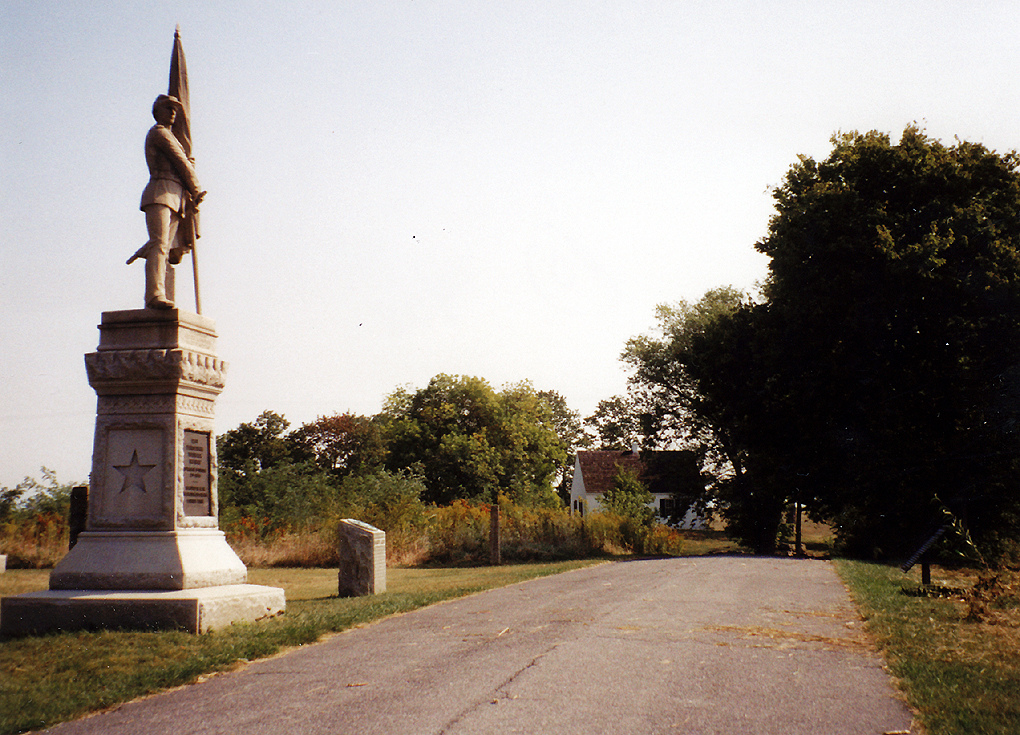

Shortly after the Regiment mustered out and returned home, the Confederate victory at the Second Battle of Winchester on June 13–15, 1863, opened the doorway for the invasion of Pennsylvania. Many of the Regiment reenlisted immediately at the State level as part of the Emergency and State Militia Troops of 1863. Others reenlisted for national service in units of infantry, cavalry or artillery, and some successively reenlisted at both levels.

== Mission statement and legacy ==
"To teach the lesson of patriotism to future generations".

== Notable members ==
- Henry C. Warfel, Medal of Honor recipient
- Honorable Josiah D. Hicks, U.S. Representative, 53rd, 54th & 55th Congresses
- Honorable Thomas McCamant, Pennsylvania Auditor General, 1888–1892
- Walter W. Greenland, Adjutant-General of the Commonwealth of Pennsylvania, 1892–1895
- Thomas Williamson Hurd Sr., Mayor of Altoona, 1878–1880
- John D. Patterson, Mayor of Harrisburg, 1875–1881

== Sources ==
- Alexander, Ted (2011). The Battle of Antietam: The Bloodiest Day. Charleston, SC: History Press. ISBN 978-1-60949-179-6.
- Armstrong, Marion V. (2024). Opposing the Second Corps at Antietam: The Fight for the Confederate Left and Center on America's Bloodiest Day. Tuscaloosa, Alabama: University Alabama Press. ISBN 978-0-8173-6169-3.
- Bates, Samuel P. (1870). History of Pennsylvania Volunteers, 1861-5. Vol. IV. Harrisburg,PA: B.Singerly – via Internet Archive.
- Bosbyshell, Oliver C., ed. (1906). Pennsylvania At Antietam. Harrisburg,PA: Harrisburg Publishing Co – via Internet Archive.
- Carman, Ezra A. (2012). Clemens, Thomas G. (ed.). The Maryland Campaign of September 1862. Vol. II: Antietam. El Dorado Hills, California: Savas Beatie LLC. ISBN 978-1-61121-114-6.
- Huyette, Miles C. (1915). The Maryland Campaign and The Battle of Antietam. Buffalo, New York: The Hammond Press – via Internet Archive.
- Priest, John Michael (1993). Antietam: The Soldiers' Battle. Oxford, UK: Oxford University Press. ISBN 0-19-508466-7.
- Regimental Committee (1906). History of the 125th PA Volunteers, 1862–1863. Philadelphia: J.B.Lippincott – via Internet Archive.
