= Jacob C. Higgins =

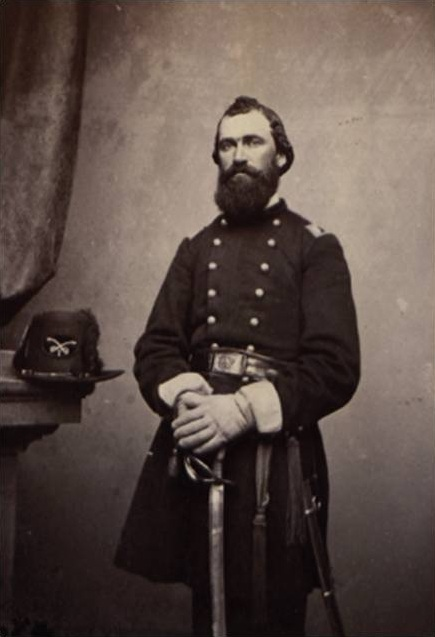
- Colonel Jacob C. Higgins
- Born: Jacob C. Higgins; March 7, 1826; Williamsburg, Pennsylvania
- Died: June 1, 1893 (aged 67) Johnstown, Pennsylvania
- Buried: Grandview Cemetery; Johnstown, Pennsylvania
- Allegiance: United States of America
- Service years: 1847–65
- Rank: Colonel
- Commands: PA Militia; 125th Pennsylvania Infantry; PA Emergency Militia; 22nd Pennsylvania Cavalry; Cavalry Brigades
- Conflicts: Mexican–American War; American Civil War

Jacob C. Higgins (1826–1893) was a commander of Pennsylvania troops who participated in both major military conflicts of his time, the Mexican–American War and the American Civil War. Among his Civil War commands, he guided the 125th Pennsylvania Infantry regiment under heavy fire during the Battle of Antietam and likewise during the Battle of Chancellorsville. Following the muster out and return home of the 125th PA, the Gettysburg campaign sent cavalry under Confederate General John D. Imboden to threaten vital railroad resources at Altoona, Pennsylvania and iron production facilities in the Juniata River watershed; in response, Emergency Militia was organized by Colonel Higgins and minimized this northwestern incursion.

== Early life ==
In 1826, Jacob Higgins was born to John and Mary R. Higgins in Williamsburg, Pennsylvania, in what would later become part of Blair County. Growing up in a rugged, mountainous region of the state and coming from an ancestry of "hardy stock", Higgins learned early many of the characteristics of toughness and independence.

== Mexican–American War ==
Following the outbreak of the Mexican–American War, Higgins soon joined "The Wayne Guards," Company M of the 2nd Pennsylvania Infantry in 1847. Mustering at Pittsburgh, the 2nd Regiment was shipped off to the seat of war in Mexico and assigned to the army of General Winfield Scott.

By September 1847, General Scott's army had pushed within striking distance of the Mexican capital, but first had to assault the remaining stronghold at Chapultepec Castle. Higgins was wounded during the assault on the Castle, but one day later, he participated in the capture of Mexico City. The Regiment was mustered out on July 21, 1848.

== Civil War commands ==
=== First Regiment of Pennsylvania Militia ===
At the outbreak of the war in 1861, he was at Portage Iron Works at Duncansville, Pennsylvania. He promptly responded to the first call for troops by Governor Andrew Curtin, who telegraphed him to come to Harrisburg at once. He was then Colonel of the First Regiment, Fourth Brigade, Eleventh Division, Pennsylvania Militia. On April 20, 1861, he was commissioned Captain and Quartermaster of the Second Brigade (General Wynkoop's) under General Robert Patterson.

=== First Pennsylvania Cavalry ===
In July 1861, he was mustered out of service and at once recruited Company G, First Pennsylvania Cavalry, and was commissioned Captain on August 1, 1861. On September 27, he was promoted to lieutenant-colonel of the First Pennsylvania Cavalry and commanded five companies. At the Battle of Dranesville, December 20, 1861, he commanded the five companies which led Union forces into the fight:

At the opening of the engagement, the cavalry was ordered to push forward, and compel the enemy to unmask his position. Colonel Higgins sent two companies, H and I, under Captain Streck, forward on the road north of the town, while companies C, D and E, Under Captain Taylor, charged directly through it, and pushed on until the enemy, opening on their flank and rear, compelled them to withdraw. The infantry now became engaged, and the cavalry was ordered to the support of Easton's Battery, where it remained until the close of action, which resulted in the total rout of the enemy.

The First Pennsylvania Cavalry is also known as the 44th Pennsylvania Volunteers.

=== 125th Pennsylvania Infantry ===
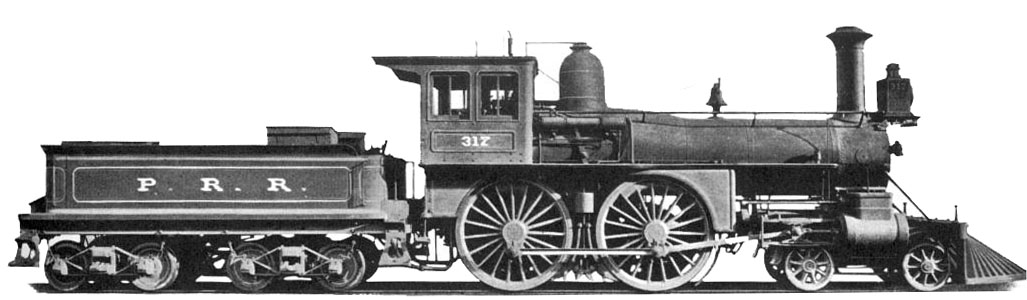
The Pennsylvania Railroad's locomotive shops at Altoona were jeopardized by the Gettysburg campaign of June–July 1863.

He resigned in 1862, helped to recruit the 125th Regiment, Pennsylvania Volunteer Infantry, and was commissioned its Colonel on August 16, 1862. He was at South Mountain but not engaged in battle. He was at the Battle of Antietam on September 17, where he spent the whole day while the regiment suffered a heavy loss. He was with the Regiment en route to Fredericksburg and was at Chancellorsville, Virginia. In that five-day battle, he commanded the left wing, Second Brigade, Geary's Division, Twelfth Army Corps, and while General Thomas L. Kane was temporarily disabled, he was in command of the Second Brigade. When the term of the Regiment expired, he was mustered out at Harrisburg on May 18, 1863.

Commonwealth historical markers at Orbisonia and Strodes Mills boast the quality of Juniata Iron. Protecting iron production facilities in Blair and Bedford Counties fell upon Colonel Higgins.

=== Emergency and State Militia Troops of 1863 ===
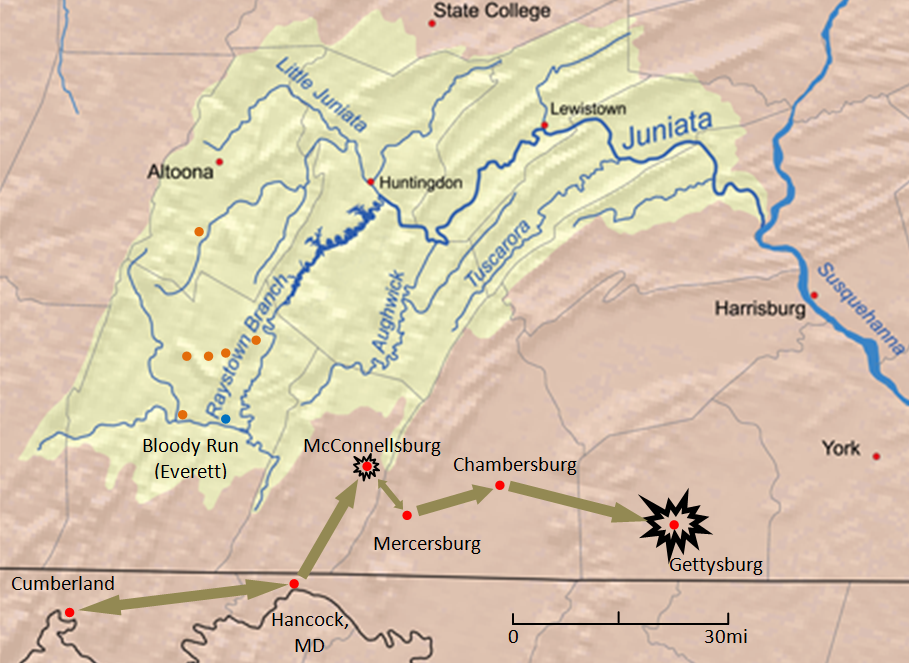
Movements of General Imboden's Confederate cavalry are shown in brown, Union General Milroy's position at Bloody Run is shown in blue, and makeshift forts by Militia under the command of Col. Higgins are shown in orange. The yellow region depicts the extent of Juniata Iron operations. Underlying map of Juniata River watershed by Karl Musser; Adaptation for Civil War historical purposes by Donald E. Coho without endorsement by Karl Musser

During the Confederate invasion of Pennsylvania, the orders to General Joseph Hooker, commanding the Army of the Potomac, were to pursue and defeat Lee while staying between Lee and Washington and Baltimore. Thereby rendered responsible for the defense of greater Pennsylvania, volunteer militia were first organized into the Department of the Susquehanna, primarily for the defense of the Commonwealth capital at Harrisburg, and the Department of the Monongahela, primarily for the defense of Pittsburgh. Although primarily agricultural, the broad region between Harrisburg and Pittsburgh held industrial assets of strategic value and fell prey to a clear and present danger.

Confederate General John D. Imboden's "Northwestern Brigade" consisted of the combined 2,100 men and six guns of the 18th Virginia Cavalry Regiment, the 62nd Virginia Infantry, one company of the Virginia Partisan Rangers, and an artillery battery. During June 1863, his Brigade had destroyed a half dozen bridges, rolling stock, depots, water tanks, and several blockhouses of the Baltimore and Ohio Railroad between Martinsburg, West Virginia and Cumberland, Maryland. It had also cut the Chesapeake and Ohio Canal in two places in Maryland and, within a short time after entering Pennsylvania, had become entirely mounted by the benefit of the plunder of local horses. Once Imoben's Brigade was in Pennsylvania, it was intended primarily to act as a screen and to secure needed supplies for General Robert E. Lee's Army of Northern Virginia.

Knowing the destructive capabilities of the Northwestern Brigade but not its intentions, Major General Darius N. Couch (commanding the Department of the Susquehanna) requested Higgins raise a regiment, and Governor Andrew Curtin assigned him command of the militia in southcentral Pennsylvania on June 16. While his men hastily constructed makeshift forts in the mountain gaps, Higgins coordinated defense of the region with a fragment of General Robert H. Milroy's defeated Eight Corps, Second Division, who had retreated to Bloody Run after the Second Battle of Winchester. Upon application, Higgins surrendered artillery to Milroy's men and loaned them a battalion under Lieutenant Jacob Szink for an expedition toward McConnellsburg.

At McConnellsburg on June 29, the Northwestern Brigade sustained its first reverse. Company G of the 18th Virginia Cavalry Regiment, led by Captain William D. Erwin, was ambushed by Capt. Abram Jones' company of the 1st New York Cavalry Regiment from Milroy's Division, working with unarmed militia cavalrymen who created the appearance of a flanking attack. Fleeing town, Erwin's Cavalry was pursued and defeated in a saber duel. Two Confederate men were killed (the first two C.S.A. soldiers to die in battle on Pennsylvania soil), and Erwin, Lieutenant Jordan, and twenty (or more) others were taken prisoner.

Imboden revealed Lee's orders after the war:

[Lee] ordered me to go into Pennsylvania as far as I deemed it prudent, west of North (Tuscarora) Mountain, and to keep an eye upon Milroy, who was reported to be collecting his scattered troops at Bloody Run.

and expressed no geographic limitations. As Burgess interprets, "In this you see that General Imboden, while he had no specific order to move against Altoona, had the authority to do so, had he deemed it prudent."

=== 22nd Pennsylvania Cavalry ===
Colonel Higgins then assisted in recruiting a battalion of five cavalry companies, which formed part of the Twenty-second Regiment, Pennsylvania Volunteer Cavalry. As Colonel of the Regiment, he participated in the Shenandoah Valley and the mountains of West Virginia and commanded the Brigade most of the time. He also commanded General Stahl's Division for some time. After the surprise and capture of the post at New Creek, he was ordered by General Philip Sheridan to march immediately to New Creek, assume command, and get the brigade into fighting condition. His command was the Second Brigade, Second Division, Department of West Virginia, with three field batteries, one fort, and 3,000 or 4,000 troops, covering Hancock, Maryland, to Piedmont, West Virginia, with headquarters at New Creek. He remained there until the close of the war and was mustered out July 21, 1865.

=== Cavalry Brigades ===
At the Second Battle of Kernstown on July 24, 1864, Higgins commanded the Second Brigade of 1st Division Cavalry.

== Post-War Life ==
He was a member of U.V.L. No. 60, and Emery Fisher Post No. 30, G.A.R., Johnstown, Pennsylvania, until his death, which occurred June 1, 1893, from an accidental self-inflicted gunshot wound. He was buried in Lot 93 Section WO3 at Grandview Cemetery in Johnstown.
