= 88th Indiana Infantry Regiment =

- Active: August 29, 1862, to June 7, 1865
- Country: United States
- Allegiance: Union
- Branch: Infantry
- Engagements: Battle of Perryville; Battle of Stones River; Tullahoma Campaign; Battle of Chickamauga; Siege of Chattanooga; Battle of Lookout Mountain; Battle of Missionary Ridge; Atlanta campaign Battle of Resaca; Battle of Kennesaw Mountain; Battle of Peachtree Creek; Siege of Atlanta; Battle of Jonesboro; Sherman's March to the Sea; Carolinas campaign Battle of Bentonville

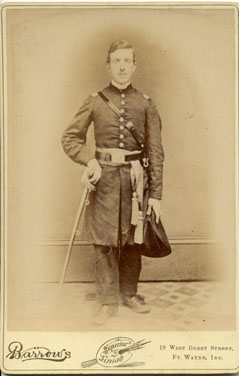
Lt. Allan H. Dougall of the 88th Indiana Infantry Regiment, awarded the Medal of Honor for his action at the Battle of Bentonville.

The 88th Indiana Infantry Regiment was an infantry regiment that served in the Union Army during the American Civil War.

== Service ==
The 88th Indiana Infantry was organized at Fort Wayne, Indiana and mustered in for a three-year enlistment in Indianapolis, Indiana, on August 29, 1862, under the command of Colonel George Humphrey. Company F was mustered in on September 13, 1862, at Louisville, Kentucky.

The regiment was attached to 17th Brigade, 3rd Division, Army of the Ohio, September 1862. 17th Brigade, 3rd Division, I Corps, Army of the Ohio, to November 1862. 2nd Brigade, 1st Division, Center, XIV Corps, Army of the Cumberland, to January 1863. 2nd Brigade, 1st Division, XIV Corps, Army of the Cumberland, to April 1863. 1st Brigade, 2nd Division, XIV Corps, to October 1863. 1st Brigade, 1st Division, XIV Corps, to June 1865.

The 88th Indiana Infantry mustered out of service on June 7, 1865.

== Detailed service ==
Ordered to Louisville, Ky., August 29, and duty there until October 1. Pursuit of Bragg into Kentucky October 1–15, 1862. Battle of Perryville, Ky., October 8. March to Nashville, Tenn., October 16-November 7, and duty there until December 26. Advance on Murfreesboro December 26–30. Battle of Stones River December 30–31, 1862 and January 1–3, 1863. Duty at Murfreesboro until June. Tullahoma Campaign June 23-July 7. Occupation of middle Tennessee until August 16. Passage of the Cumberland Mountains and Tennessee River and Chickamauga Campaign August 16-September 22. Davis Cross Roads or Dug Gap September 11. Battle of Chickamauga September 19–21. Rossville Gap September 21. Siege of Chattanooga, September 24-November 23. Chattanooga-Ringgold Campaign November 23–27. Lookout Mountain November 23–24. Missionary Ridge November 25. Pea Vine Creek and Graysville November 26. Ringgold Gap, Taylor's Ridge, November 27. March to Charleston December 30, 1863, to January 10, 1864. Demonstration on Dalton, Ga., February 22–27, 1864. Tunnel Hill, Buzzard's Roost Gap and Rocky Faced Ridge February 23–25. Atlanta Campaign May 1-September 8. Demonstration on Rocky Faced Ridge May 8–11. Buzzard's Roost Gap, May 8–9. Battle of Resaca May 14–15. Advance on Dallas May 18–25. Operations on line of Pumpkin Vine Creek and battles about Dallas, New Hope Church and Allatoona Hills May 25-June 5. Operations about Marietta and against Kennesaw Mountain June 10-July 2. Pine Hill June 11–14. Lost Mountain June 15–17. Assault on Kennesaw June 27. Ruff's Station July 4. Chattahoochie River July 5–17. Buckhead, Nancy's Creek, July 18. Peachtree Creek July 19–20. Siege of Atlanta July 22-August 25. Utoy Creek August 5–7. Flank movement on Jonesboro August 25–30. Near Red Oak August 30. Battle of Jonesboro August 31-September 1. Operations against Hood in northern Georgia and northern Alabama September 29-November 3. March to the Sea November 15-December 10. Siege of Savannah December 10–21. Campaign of the Carolinas January to April, 1865. Averysboro, N.C., March 16. Battle of Bentonville March 19–21. Occupation of Goldsboro March 24. Advance on Raleigh April 10–14. Occupation of Raleigh April 14. Bennett's House April 26. Surrender of Johnston and his army. March to Washington, D.C., via Richmond, Va., April 29-May 19. Grand Review of the Armies May 24.

== Casualties ==
The regiment lost a total of 214 men during service; 9 officers and 55 enlisted men killed or mortally wounded, 3 officers and 147 enlisted men died of disease.

== Commanders ==
- Colonel George Humphrey
- Colonel Cyrus A. Briant

== Notable members ==
- 1st Lieutenant Allan H. Dougall, Adjutant - Medal of Honor recipient, for action at the Battle of Bentonville

== See also ==
- List of Indiana Civil War regiments
- Indiana in the Civil War
