= John Kinsey =

American Civil War soldier

- Born: c. 1842; Lancaster County, Pennsylvania, US
- Died: December 19, 1904; Indianapolis, Indiana, US
- Burial place: Crown Hill Cemetery and Arboretum, Section 21, Lot 1
- Other name: John McKenzie

John Kinsey (c. 1842 – December 19, 1904), also known as John McKenzie, was an American soldier and recipient of the Medal of Honor for his actions during the American Civil War.

== Biography ==
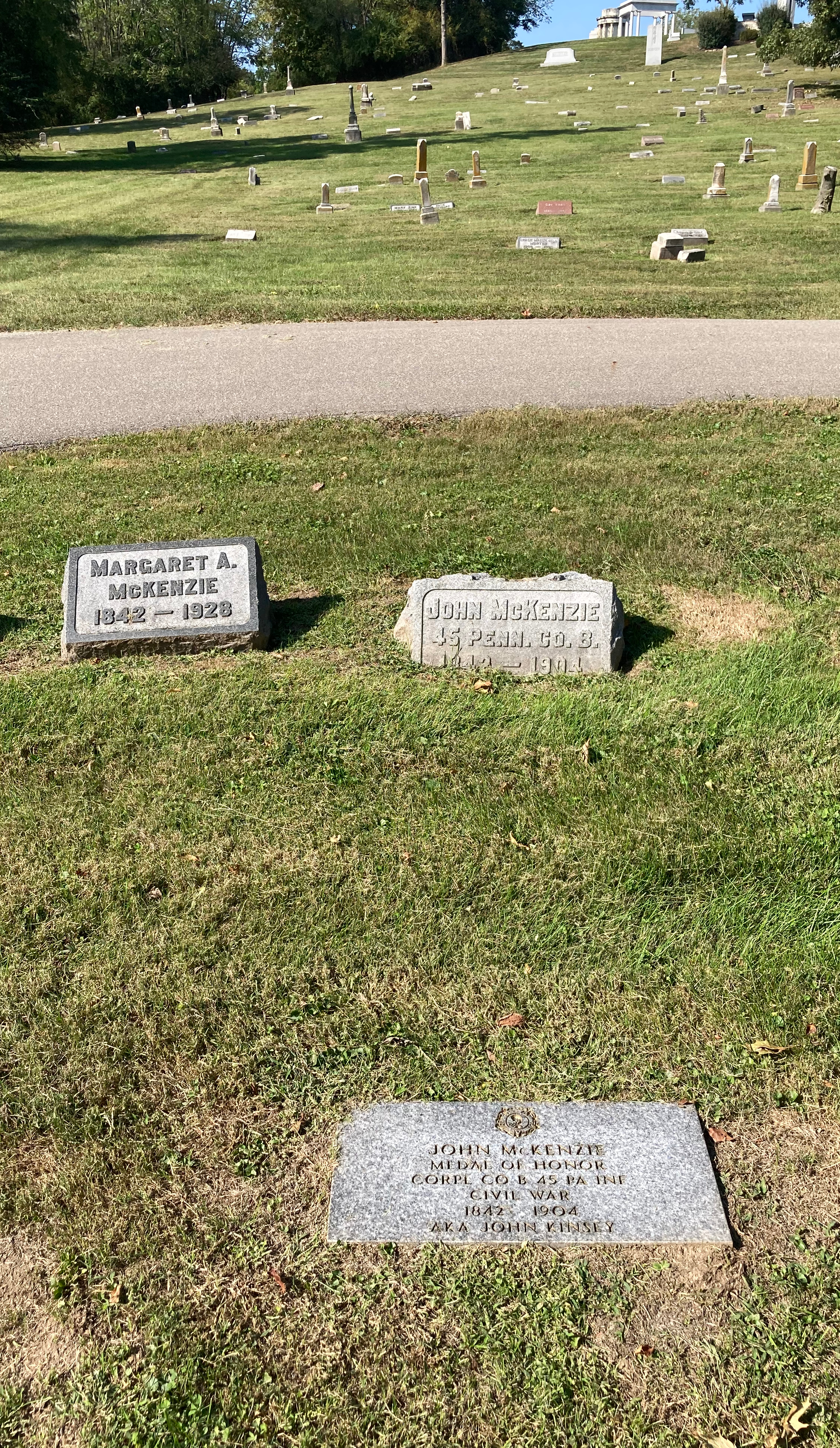
Kinsey's grave at Crown Hill Cemetery

Kinsey was born in Lancaster County, Pennsylvania sometime during the early 1840s. He served as corporal in Company B of the 45th Pennsylvania Infantry Regiment in the Union Army. He earned his medal in action at the Battle of Spotsylvania Court House, Virginia on May 18, 1864. His medal was issued on March 2, 1897. He died in Indianapolis, Indiana on December 19, 1904. He is buried in Crown Hill Cemetery, Indianapolis in Section 21, Lot 1.

== Medal of Honor Citation ==
For extraordinary heroism on 18 May 1864, in action at Spotsylvania, Virginia. Corporal Kinsey seized the colors, the Color Bearer having been shot, and with great gallantry succeeded in saving them from capture.
