= Edward Ratcliff =

Edward Ratcliff may refer to:

- Ed Ratcliff (born 1983), retired American professional mixed martial artist
- Edward C. Ratcliff (1896–1967), English Anglican priest and liturgical scholar
- Edward Ratcliff (soldier) (1835–1915), African American Union Army soldier
