= Edward A. Holton =

Union Army Medal of Honor recipient

Edward Alexander Holton
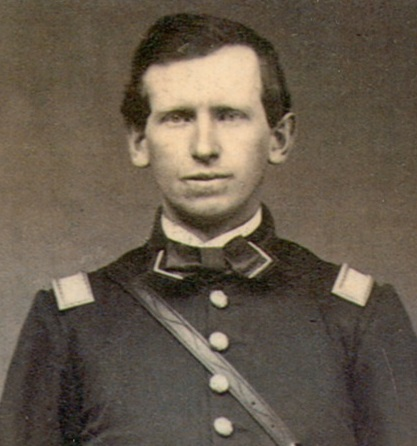
- Born: August 28, 1835; Westminster, Vermont, US
- Died: January 29, 1906 (aged 70); Bernardston, Massachusetts, US
- Burial place: Old Westminster Cemetery, Westminster, Vermont, US
- Military career
- Allegiance: United States; Union
- Branch: United States Army; Union Army
- Rank: Captain
- Units: 1st Vermont Infantry (Company H, May–August 1861); 6th Vermont Infantry (Company I, 1861-1864)
- Conflicts: American Civil War • Siege of Yorktown and Lee's Mills • Seven Days campaign • Battle of Garnett's & Golding's Farm • Battle of Williamsburg • Battle of Savage's Station • Battle of White Oak Swamp • Battle of Malvern Hill • Second Battle of Bull Run • Battle of South Mountain • Battle of Antietam • Battle of Fredericksburg • Second Battle of Fredericksburg • Battle of Salem Church • Battle of the Wilderness
- Awards: Medal of Honor

Edward Alexander Holton (August 28, 1835 – January 29, 1906) was an American soldier who was awarded the United States' highest honor for valor, the Medal of Honor, for his gallantry while fighting with the 6th Vermont Infantry during the American Civil War. The award was issued in recognition of his efforts, while under heavy enemy fire, to prevent the American flag from falling into enemy hands after his regiment's color-bearer fell in action during the Battle of Lee's Mills, Virginia in April 1862.

== Formative years ==
Born in Westminster, Vermont on August 28, 1835, Edward Alexander Holton was a son of Erastus Alexander and Hannah Brainard (May) Holton. He was educated in Westminster and at Kimball Union Academy.

In 1850, he resided in Westminster with his widowed mother and brothers, David and Joel. Also residing at the family home were boarders, John Farewell, Julia Alby and Clarissa Farewell.

== Civil War ==
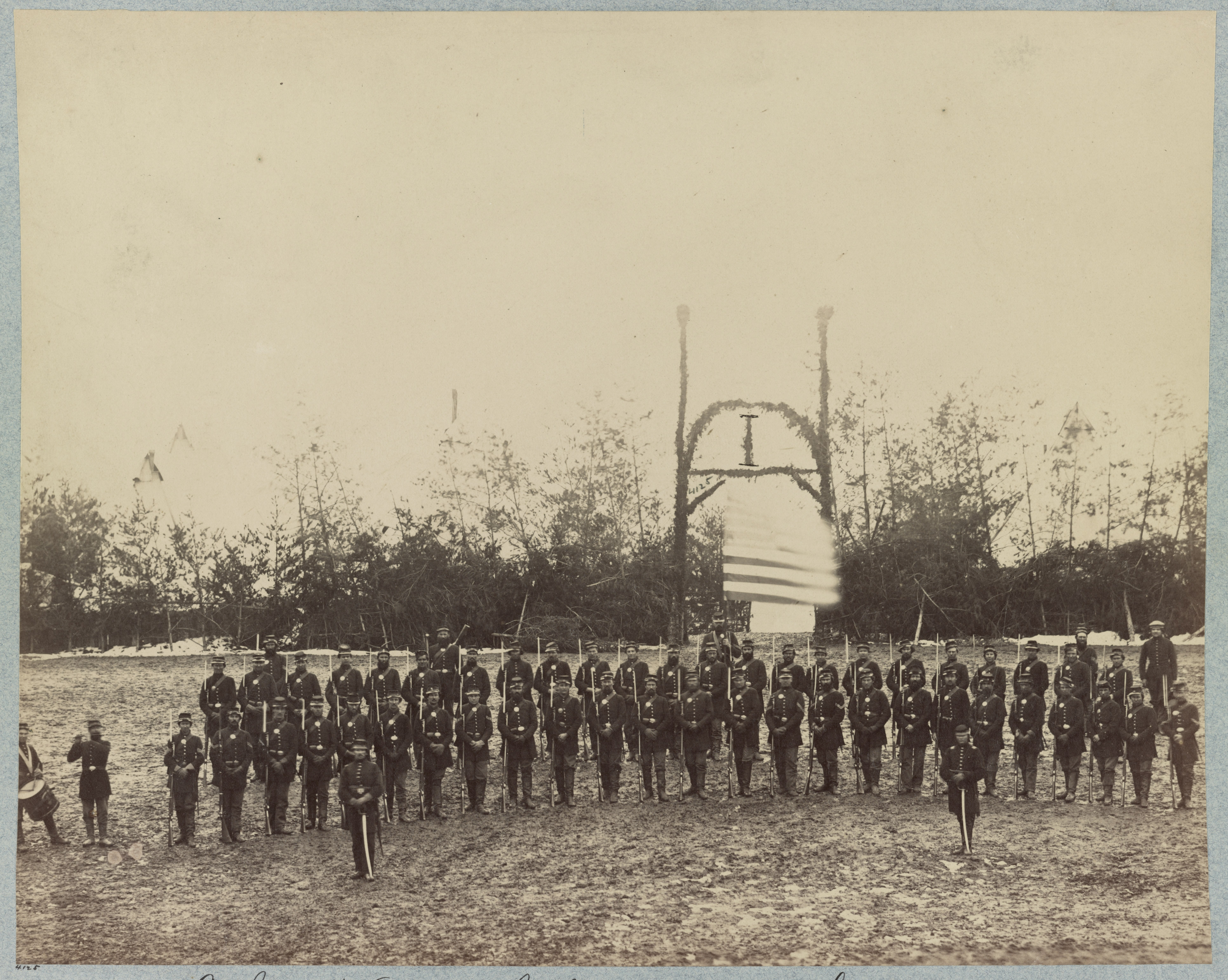
6th Vermont Infantry's Co. I, Camp Griffin, Virginia, fall 1861

Holton was one of the early responders to President Abraham Lincoln's call for volunteers to help defend the nation's capital following the fall of Fort Sumter at the dawn of the American Civil War. Choosing to enlist from his place of birth – Williston, Vermont, he enrolled for military service on May 2, 1861, as a member of Company H, 1st Vermont Infantry. After honorably completing his Three Months' Service, he mustered out on August 15, 1861.

He then promptly re-enlisted for a three-year tour of duty, enrolling on August 28, 1861 as a first sergeant with Company I, 6th Vermont Infantry. During the fall of 1861, he was stationed with his regiment at Camp Griffin, Virginia.

It was in the spring of 1862 that Holton performed the act of valor for which he would later be awarded the U.S. Medal of Honor. On April 16, while fighting with the 6th Vermont at Lee's Mills, Virginia during the Siege of Yorktown, Holton rescued the national colors after his regiment's color-bearer fell in action after being shot. The next day, Holton was promoted to the rank of second lieutenant by Brigadier-General W. T. H. Brooks, and he and his regiment were praised for their performance by Brooks via General Order No. 36:

The brigadier-general commanding congratulates the troops of this brigade for the conduct exhibited by them yesterday while under fire. The invincibility of spirit shown by these companies, exposed to a terrible fire from the enemy sheltered in rifle pits, is worthy of the highest admiration.

The conduct of 1st Sergt. Holton, I company, 6th Vermont Vol., in securing and bringing back the colors of the regiment after the bearer was shot down is deserving of special notice, as a praiseworthy and daring act.

Let your future conduct rival that of yesterday, and your friends and your state will well be proud of you.

Holton then participated with his regiment in the Peninsula Campaign in Virginia, including the Battle of Williamsburg (May 5, 1862), and the Seven Days Battles at: Golding's Farm (June 27–28, 1862), Savage's Station and White Oak Swamp (June 29–30, 1962); in the Maryland Campaign, including the battles of: South Mountain (September 14, 1862) and Antietam (September 17, 1862); and in the Second Battle of Bull Run (August 28–30, 1862), Battle of Fredericksburg (December 11–15, 1862), Second Battle of Fredericksburg/Marye's Heights (May 3, 1863), and Battle of Salem Church (May 3–4, 1863), according to a letter penned by Holton to his family from his regiment's camp near "White-Oak Church, Va." on May 17, 1863:

DearUncle:— Perhaps it may be of interest to you to know what I have been doing for the last two years for our dearly beloved country. You probably recollect that when I saw you last, two years since, I was a high private in the First Vermont Volunteers. Well, I served my time out and held my own very well. After I was mustered out on the 15th of August, 1861, I wrested [sic] for a few days; but on the 28th of August, the day I arrived at twenty-six years of age, I had enlisted again.

As it was not position or money that I was going for, I accepted an appointment as first sergeant, in which position I served faithfully until the 16th day of April, 1862, when we went into the first real battle, and I was fortunate enough to secure the colors of the regiment after the color bearer was shot, and brought them out—also the command of the company devolved on me on account of Lieutenant King being wounded. Brigadier Gen. Brooks saw fit to give me an honorable mention in general orders, and appointed me second Lieutenant in my own company. The Governor of Vermont ratified it, and at the present time I hold that rank. I have been in the following battles, but have not been hit yet, viz—1, Lee's Mills; 2, Williamsburg; 3, Golding's Farm; 4, Savage's Station; 5, White-Oak Swamp; 6, Malvern Hills; 7. 2d Bull Run; 8, South Mountain; 9, Antietam; 10, First battle of Fredericksburg.

At the time of the second and last battle of Fredericksburg, I was at home in Vermont on fifteen days' leave. In this last battle the Sixth Corps (to which we belong) got hard pushed, and Gen. Howe said to Col. Grant, commander of the Vermont Brigade, "On your brigade depends the safety of the whole Corps." And sure enough! the rest of the division could not stand the pressure, but either fell back or disgracefully ran, and left the brigade to work alone against a rebel corps.

For the honor of the State, let me say that they, like the Green Mountain boys at Hubbardstown, stood their ground for a while, then charged, and had a hand-to-hand conflict, in which they, they Vermont boys, came off victors.

An officer of another corps as heard to say that the "honor of being a private in the Vermont Brigade was greater than to be a Colonel in any other."

David is third sergeant in my company, Joel is second sergeant in the Twelfth Vermont. Hascal Phelps, my step-father's son, is first sergeant in the Tenth Vermont, and Oscar Phelps is corporal in the Thirteenth Vermont, making five soldiers out of one family.

Your affectionate nephew, Edward A. Holton

—N.Y. Evening Post

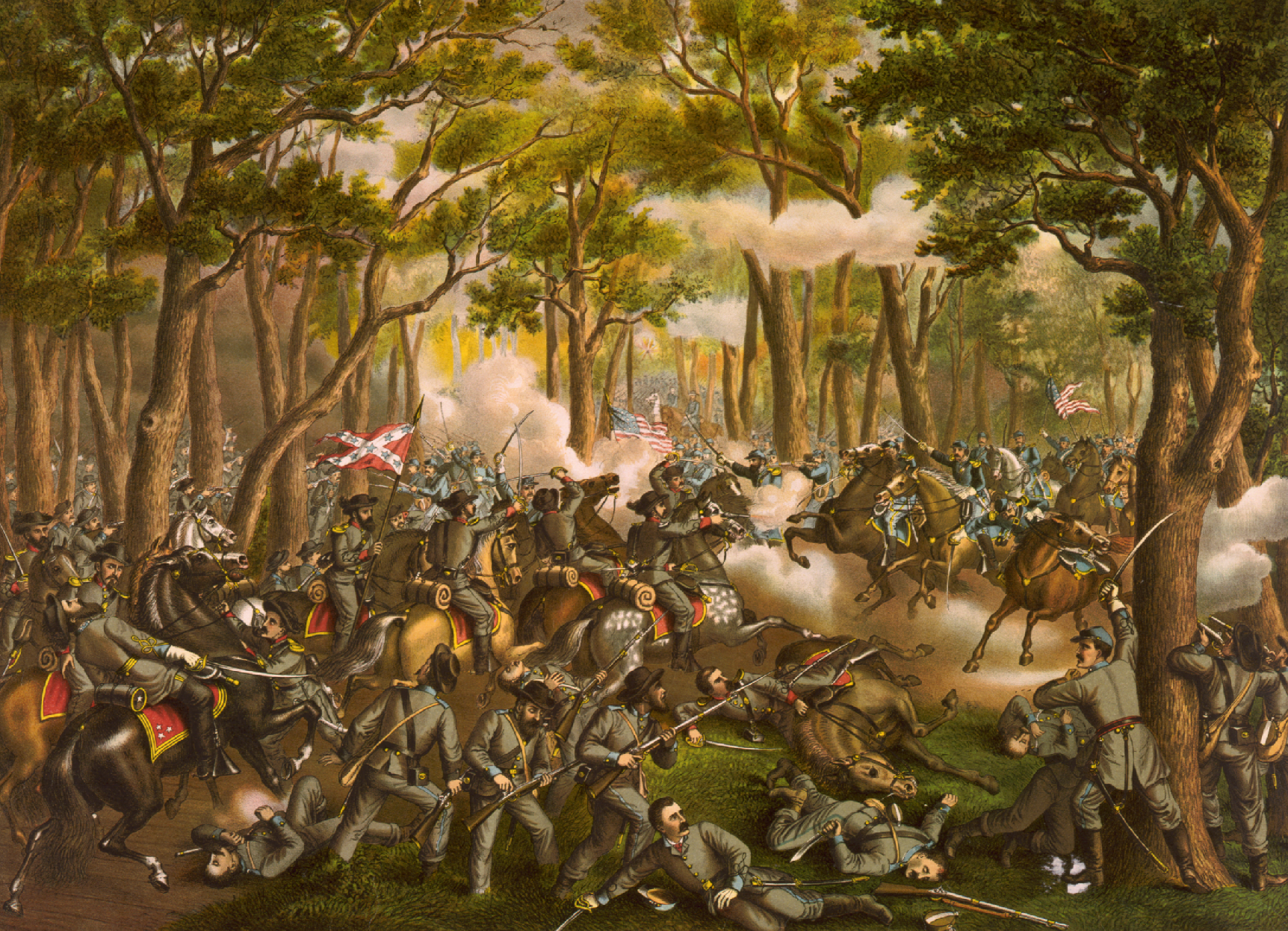
Battle of the Wilderness, May 5–7, 1864 (U.S. Library of Congress).

Commissioned as a first lieutenant with his regiment on June 5, 1863, he was granted a furlough in recognition of his service, and returned home to Vermont sometime during the late summer of that year. While there, he wed Katherine Matilda Chase (1841-1891) in Alburgh, Vermont on September 15. A native of Champlain, New York, she was a daughter of the Rev. John and Roxanna (Shute) Chase. During the first years of his marriage, he documented key moments in his regiment's history as he described his life as a Civil War-era soldier in letters home to his wife, including the November 3, 1863 execution of a deserter and another soldier's attempt the next day to injure himself badly enough that he would be unable to fulfill the terms of his enlistment.

On May 5, 1864, Holton became a casualty himself, wounded seriously while fighting with the 6th Vermont Infantry in the Battle of the Wilderness. Ten days later, while recuperating from his wounds, he was commissioned as a captain with his regiment. He was then honorably discharged on a surgeon's certificate of disability on August 17, 1864, and sent home to his family in Vermont.

== Post-war life ==
Following his honorable discharge from the military, Holton returned home to his wife. By 1870, they had relocated to the community of Lee, Massachusetts in Berkshire County. Employed at a paper mill, according to the federal census which was conducted on July 2 that year, his household had grown to include daughter Katherine May (1865–1942) and son Charles (1868–1939). By 1880, he was living in Burlington, Vermont and working as a carpenter.

Holton was still residing in Burlington in 1890 when he was appointed deputy U.S. customs collector for Vermont. He was widowed in 1891 after his wife developed acute peritonitis and succumbed in Colrain, Massachusetts on November 3.

== Death and interment ==
Still a widower after the turn of the century, Holton resided with his son, Charles — a physician, at his home in Bernardston, Massachusetts. Holton died in Bernardston on January 26, 1906. Following funeral services on January 31, 1906, he was interred at the Old Westminster Cemetery in Westminster, Vermont.

== Medal of Honor ==
Holton was awarded the Medal of Honor on July 9, 1892 for his actions at the Battle of Lee's Mills on April 16, 1862. At this time, he was his company's first sergeant.

Rescued the colors of his regiment under heavy fire, the color bearer having been shot down while the troops were in retreat.

== See also ==
- List of Medal of Honor recipients
- Vermont in the American Civil War
