= Allan H. Dougall =

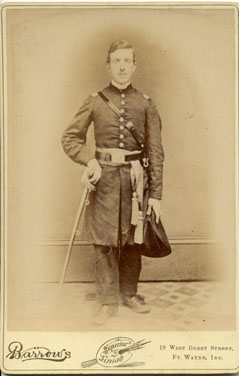
- Born: July 17, 1836; Scotland
- Died: May 22, 1912 (aged 75); New Haven, Indiana
- Burial place: IOOF Cemetery
- Military career
- Allegiance: United States of America
- Branch: United States Army
- Rank: First Lieutenant
- Unit: 88th Indiana Volunteer Infantry Regiment
- Conflicts: Battle of Bentonville
- Awards: Medal of Honor

Allan Houston Dougall (July 17, 1836 – May 22, 1912) was a Scottish soldier who fought in the American Civil War. Dougall received the United States' highest award for bravery during combat, the Medal of Honor, for his action during the Battle of Bentonville in North Carolina on March 19, 1865. He was honored with the award on February 16, 1897.

== Biography ==
Dougall was born in Scotland on July 17, 1836. He enlisted into the 88th Indiana Infantry. He died on May 22, 1912. His remains are interred at the I.O.O.F. Cemetery in New Haven, Indiana.

Dougall was a companion of the Indiana Commandery of the Military Order of the Loyal Legion of the United States.

== Medal of Honor citation ==
In the face of a galling fire from the enemy he voluntarily returned to where the color bearer had fallen wounded and saved the flag of his regiment from capture.

== See also ==
- List of American Civil War Medal of Honor recipients: A–F
