= Lorenzo Denning =

Lorenzo Denning (Dening by birth)
- Born: September 6, 1843; Granby, Connecticut
- Died: February 8, 1865 (aged 21)
- Burial place: Fairview Cemetery, New Britain, Connecticut
- Military career
- Allegiance: United States of America
- Branch: United States Navy
- Service years: September 18, 1864 to February 8, 1865
- Rank: Landsman
- Unit: (Connecticut) U.S. Navy
- Awards: Medal of Honor

Landsman Lorenzo Denning (September 6, 1843 – February 8, 1865) was an American soldier who fought in the American Civil War. Denning received the country's highest award for bravery during combat, the Medal of Honor, for his action aboard USN Picket Boat Number One on 27 October 1864. He was awarded the medal on 31 December 1864, but died before it was presented to him.

== Biography ==
Denning was born in Granby, Connecticut on 6 September 1843. He enlisted into the United States Navy. Denning was taken as a Prisoner of War on the day he performed the act of gallantry that earned him the Medal of Honor. He died on 8 February 1865 in a POW camp and his remains are interred in a trench of unknowns at Salisbury National Cemetery. There is an "In Memory Of" headstone in the family plot in Fairview Cemetery, New Britain, Connecticut.

== Medal of Honor citation ==
Denning served on board the U.S. Picket Boat No. 1 in action, 27 October 1864, against the Confederate ram Albemarle which had resisted repeated attacks by our steamers and had kept a large force of vessels employed in watching her. The picket boat, equipped with a spar torpedo, succeeded in passing the enemy pickets within 20 yards without being discovered and then made for the Albemarle under a full head of steam. Immediately taken under fire by the ram, the small boat plunged on, jumped the log boom which encircled the target and exploded its torpedo under the port bow of the ram. The picket boat was destroyed by enemy fire and almost the entire crew taken prisoner or lost.

== See also ==
- List of American Civil War Medal of Honor recipients: A–F
