= Nicholas Fanning =

American soldier in the American Civil War

- Born: Carroll County, Indiana, US
- Military career
- Allegiance: United States of America
- Branch: United States Army
- Service years: 1862 - 1865
- Rank: Private
- Units: Company B, 4th Iowa Volunteer Cavalry Regiment
- Conflicts: Battle of Selma
- Awards: Medal of Honor

Private Nicholas Fanning was an American soldier who fought in the American Civil War. Fanning received the country's highest award for bravery during combat, the Medal of Honor, for his action during the Battle of Selma in Alabama on 2 April 1865. He was honored with the award on 17 June 1865.

== Biography ==
Fanning was born in Carroll County, Indiana. He enlisted into the 4th Iowa Cavalry.

== Medal of Honor citation ==
Capture of silk Confederate States flag and 2 staff officers.

== See also ==
- List of American Civil War Medal of Honor recipients: A–F
