= List of American Civil War Medal of Honor recipients: A–F =

This is an alphabetical list (A to F) of Medal of Honor recipients during the Civil War. Many of the awards were for capturing or saving regimental flags. During the Civil War, regimental flags served as the rallying point for the unit, and guided the unit's movements. Loss of the flag could greatly disrupt a unit, and could have a greater effect than the death of the commanding officer.

== Medal of Honor ==
The Medal of Honor is the highest military decoration awarded by the United States government and is bestowed on a member of the United States armed forces who distinguishes himself "…conspicuously by gallantry and intrepidity at the risk of his life above and beyond the call of duty while engaged in an action against an enemy of the United States…" Given the risk of life required for earning the medal, it is commonly presented posthumously.

Recipients are listed alphabetically by last name. Posthumous receipt is denoted by an asterisk. The rank indicated is the individual's rank at the time of their Medal of Honor action.

== A ==
Image	Name	Service	Rank	Unit/Command	Place of action	Date of action	Notes
—	James Frank Adams	Army	Private	1st West Virginia Volunteer Cavalry Regiment	Nineveh, Virginia	Nov 12, 1864	Capture of State flag of 14th Virginia Cavalry (C.S.A.); Adams was born in Cabell County, West Virginia. While a Private in Company D of the 1st West Virginia Volunteer Cavalry Regiment, he captured the flag of the 14th Virginia Cavalry during an engagement on November 12, 1864, at Nineveh in Virginia. His Medal of Honor was issued two weeks later, on November 26.
Young white man sitting on a chair with his legs crossed and his right arm resting on a table beside him. He is wearing light colored pants and a military jacket buttoned at the top only with a vest underneath.	John G. B. Adams	Army	Second Lieutenant	19th Regiment Massachusetts Volunteer Infantry	Battle of Fredericksburg, Virginia	Dec 13, 1862	Seized the 2 colors from the hands of a corporal and a lieutenant as they fell mortally wounded, and with a color in each hand advanced across the field to a point where the regiment was reformed on those colors.
—	Michael Aheam	Navy	Paymaster's Steward	(United States Navy) USS Kearsarge (1861)	Aboard USS Kearsarge off Cherbourg, France	Jun 19, 1864	Served on board USS Kearsarge when she destroyed the CSS Alabama off Cherbourg, France, 19 June 1864.
—	Frederick Alber	Army	Private	17th Regiment Michigan Volunteer Infantry	Battle of Spotsylvania Court House, Virginia	May 12, 1864	Bravely rescued Lt. Charles H. Todd of his regiment who had been captured by a party of Confederates by shooting down one, knocking over another with the butt of his musket, and taking them both prisoners.
—	Christian Albert	Army	Private	47th Regiment Ohio Volunteer Infantry	Battle of Vicksburg, Miss.	May 22, 1863	Gallantry in the charge of the "volunteer storming party."
—	Abner P. Allen	Army	Corporal	39th Regiment Illinois Volunteer Infantry	Third Battle of Petersburg, Virginia	Apr 2, 1865	Gallantry as color bearer in the assault on Fort Gregg.
—	James Allen	Army	Private	(New York (state)) 16th Regiment New York Volunteer Infantry	Battle of South Mountain, Md.	Sep 14, 1862	Single-handed and slightly wounded he accosted a squad of 14 Confederate soldiers bearing the colors of the 16th Georgia Infantry (C.S.A.).
	Nathaniel M. Allen	Army	Corporal	1st Regiment Massachusetts Volunteer Infantry	Battle of Gettysburg, Pa.	Jul 2, 1863	When his regiment was falling back, this soldier, bearing the national color, returned in the face of the enemy's fire, pulled the regimental flag from under the body of its bearer, who had fallen, saved the flag from capture, and brought both colors off the field.
Head and shoulders of a thin white man with a bushy Van Dyke mustache and hair parted at the side. He is wearing a double-breasted military jacket with two stars on a patch on the shoulder.	Adelbert Ames	Army	First Lieutenant	5th United States Artillery	First Battle of Bull Run, Virginia	Jul 21, 1861	Artillery commander who stayed with his battery despite grave wounds.
—	Robert W. Ammerman	Army	Private	148th Regiment Pennsylvania Volunteer Infantry	Battle of Spotsylvania Court House, Virginia	May 12, 1864	Capture of battle flag of 8th North Carolina (C.S.A.), being one of the foremost in the assault.
—	Bruce Anderson	Army	Private	(New York (state)) 142nd Regiment New York Volunteer Infantry	Second Battle of Fort Fisher, North Carolina	Jan 15, 1865	Voluntarily advanced with the head of the column and cut down the palisading.
	Charles W. Anderson	Army	Private	(New York (state)) 1st Regiment New York Volunteer Cavalry	Battle of Waynesboro, Virginia	Mar 2, 1865	Capture of unknown Confederate flag.
	Everett W. Anderson	Army	Sergeant	15th Regiment Pennsylvania Volunteer Cavalry	Cosby Creek, Tenn.	Jan 14, 1864	Captured, single-handed, Confederate Brig. Gen. Robert B. Vance during a charge upon the enemy.
—	Frederick C. Anderson	Army	Private	18th Regiment Massachusetts Volunteer Infantry	Battle of Globe Tavern, Virginia	Aug 21, 1864	Capture of battle flag of 27th South Carolina (C.S.A.) and the color bearer.
	Marion T. Anderson	Army	Captain	51st Regiment Indiana Volunteer Infantry	Battle of Nashville, Tenn.	Dec 16, 1864	Led his regiment over 5 lines of the enemy's works, where he fell, severely wounded.
Head of a white man with a wide pointed mustache and neatly combed hair, wearing a dark suit coat and bow tie.	Peter Anderson	Army	Private	31st Regiment Wisconsin Volunteer Infantry	Battle of Bentonville, North Carolina	Mar 19, 1865	Entirely unassisted, brought from the field an abandoned piece of artillery and saved the gun from falling into the hands of the enemy.
—	Robert Anderson	Navy	Quartermaster	(United States Navy) USS Crusader (United States Navy) USS Keokuk	Aboard USS Crusader and USS Keokuk	Various	Served on board USS Crusader and USS Keokuk during various actions of those vessels.
—	Thomas Anderson	Army	Corporal	1st Regiment West Virginia Volunteer Cavalry	Battle of Appomattox Station, Virginia	Apr 8, 1865	Capture of Confederate flag
—	John Anglin	Navy	Cabin Boy	(United States Navy) USS Pontoosuc (1864)	Aboard USS Pontoosuc, First and Second Battles of Fort Fisher	Dec 24, 1864 – Jan 22, 1865	Served on board USS Pontoosuc during the capture of Fort Fisher and Wilmington, 24 December 1864 to 22 January 1865.
—	Andrew O. Apple	Army	Corporal	12th Regiment West Virginia Volunteer Infantry	Third Battle of Petersburg, Virginia	Apr 2, 1865	Conspicuous gallantry as color bearer in the assault on Fort Gregg.
—	William H. Appleton	Army	First Lieutenant	(United States) 4th U.S. Colored Infantry	Second Battle of Petersburg, Virginia and Battle of Chaffin's Farm, Virginia	Jun 15, 1864 and Sep 29, 1864	The first man of the Eighteenth Corps to enter the enemy's works at Petersburg, Virginia, 15 June 1864. Valiant service in a desperate assault at New Market Heights, Virginia, inspiring the Union troops by his example of steady courage.
	James W. Archer	Army	First Lieutenant and Adjutant	59th Regiment Indiana Volunteer Infantry	Second Battle of Corinth, Miss.	Oct 4, 1862	Voluntarily took command of another regiment, with the consent of one or more of his seniors, who were present, rallied the command and led it in the assault.
—	Lester Archer	Army	Sergeant	(New York (state)) 96th Regiment New York Volunteer Infantry	Battle of Chaffin's Farm, Virginia	Sep 29, 1864	Gallantry in placing the colors of his regiment on the fort.
	William J. Archinal	Army	Corporal	30th Regiment Ohio Volunteer Infantry	Battle of Vicksburg, Miss.	May 22, 1863	Gallantry in the charge of the "volunteer storming party."
—	Clinton L. Armstrong	Army	Private	83rd Regiment Indiana Volunteer Infantry	Battle of Vicksburg, Miss.	May 22, 1863	Gallantry in the charge of the "volunteer storming party."
Head and shoulders of a young white man with thick hair and a smirk, wearing a jacket with stripes on the upper sleeves and decorative cords running horizontally across the chest. The words "A.K. Arnold, Bedford, Pa." are written at lower right.	Abraham K. Arnold	Army	Captain	(United States) 5th U.S. Cavalry	Davenport Bridge, Virginia	May 10, 1864	By a gallant charge against a superior force of the enemy, extricated his command from a perilous position in which it had been ordered.
—	Matthew Arther	Navy	Signal Quartermaster	(United States Navy) USS Carondelet	Aboard USS Carondelet, Battle of Fort Henry and Battle of Fort Donelson	Feb 6, 1862 and Feb 14, 1862	For valor and devotion, serving most faithfully, effectively and valiantly.
—	Charles Asten	Navy	Quarter Gunner	(United States Navy) USS Signal	Aboard USS Signal, Red River Campaign	May 5, 1864	Although on the sick list, Q.G. Asten courageously carried out his duties during the entire engagement.
—	Thomas E. Atkinson	Navy	Yeoman	(United States Navy) USS Richmond	Aboard USS Richmond, Battle of Mobile Bay	August 5, 1864	On board the U.S.S. Richmond, Mobile Bay, 5 August 1864; commended for coolness and energy in supplying the rifle ammunition, which was under his sole charge, in the action in Mobile Bay on the morning of 5 August 1864.
—	James Avery	Navy	Seaman	(United States Navy) USS Metacomet	Aboard USS Metacomet, Battle of Mobile Bay	August 5, 1864	Braved galling enemy fire to aid the rescue of USS Tecumseh (1863) crewmen
—	William B. Avery	Army	Lieutenant	(New York (state)) 1st New York Marine Artillery Regiment	Battle of Tranter's Creek, North Carolina	Jun 5, 1862	Handled his battery with greatest coolness amidst the hottest fire.
	David Ayers	Army	Sergeant	57th Regiment Ohio Volunteer Infantry	Battle of Vicksburg, Miss.	May 22, 1863	Gallantry in the charge of the "volunteer storming party."
	John G. K. Ayers	Army	Private	8th Missouri Volunteer Infantry	Battle of Vicksburg, Miss.	May 22, 1863	Gallantry in the charge of the "volunteer storming party."

== B ==
This along with the * , indicates that the Medal of Honor was awarded posthumously

Image	Name	Service	Rank	Unit/Command	Place of action	Date of action	Notes
	William J. Babcock	Army	Sergeant	2nd Rhode Island Infantry	Third Battle of Petersburg, Virginia	Apr 2, 1865	Planted the flag upon the parapet while the enemy still occupied the line; was the first of his regiment to enter the works.
—	Elijah W. Bacon*	Army	Private	14th Regiment Connecticut Volunteer Infantry	Battle of Gettysburg, Pa.	Jul 3, 1863	Capture of flag of 16th North Carolina regiment (C.S.A.).
Head and shoulders of a white man with bags under his eyes and a large, bushy mustache and connected sideburns. He is wearing a double-breasted military jacket with two stars on a patch on the shoulder.	Absalom Baird	Army	Brigadier General	Commander, 3rd Division, XIV Corps, Army of the Cumberland	Battle of Jonesborough, Ga.	Sep 1, 1864	Led a detached brigade charge
—	Charles Baker	Navy	Quarter Gunner	(United States Navy) USS Metacomet	Aboard USS Metacomet, Battle of Mobile Bay	August 5, 1864	Braved galling enemy fire to aid the rescue of USS Tecumseh (1863) crewmen
—	Charles H. Baldwin	Navy	Coal Heaver	(United States Navy) USS Wyalusing	Aboard USS Wyalusing in the Roanoke River	May 25, 1864	For his participation in a plan to destroy the rebel ram CSS Albemarle
Head and torso portrait of a white man with a pointed mustache wearing a military jacket.	Frank D. Baldwin	Army	Captain	19th Regiment Michigan Volunteer Infantry	Peach Tree Creek, Ga.	Jul 12, 1864	For capturing two enemy officers. Later awarded a second Medal of Honor during the Indian Wars.
—	Frederick Ballen	Army	Private	47th Regiment Ohio Volunteer Infantry	Vicksburg, Miss.	May 3, 1863	Was one of a party that volunteered and attempted to run the enemy's batteries with a steam tug and 2 barges loaded with subsistence stores.
	George L. Banks	Army	Sergeant	15th Regiment Indiana Volunteer Infantry	Battle of Missionary Ridge, Tenn.	Nov 25, 1863	As color bearer, led his regiment in the assault, and, though wounded, carried the flag forward to the enemy's works, where he was again wounded. In a brigade of 8 regiments this flag was the first planted on the parapet.
—	James A. Barber	Army	Corporal	Battery G, 1st Regiment Rhode Island Volunteer Light Artillery	Third Battle of Petersburg, Virginia	Apr 2, 1865	Was one of a detachment of 20 picked artillerymen who voluntarily accompanied an infantry assaulting party, and who turned upon the enemy the guns captured in the assault.
—	Nathaniel C. Barker	Army	Sergeant	11th Regiment New Hampshire Volunteer Infantry	Battle of Spotsylvania Court House, Virginia	May 12, 1864	Six color bearers of the regiment having been killed, he voluntarily took both flags of the regiment and carried them through the remainder of the battle.
—	William H. Barnes	Army	Private	38th Regiment United States Colored Infantry	Battle of Chaffin's Farm, Virginia	Sep 29, 1864	Among the first to enter the enemy's works; although wounded.
Profile of a white man with mustache wearing a double-breasted military jacket with one star on a patch on the shoulder.	Henry A. Barnum	Army	Colonel	(New York (state)) 149th Regiment New York Volunteer Infantry	Third Battle of Chattanooga, Tenn.	Nov 23, 1863	Although suffering severely from wounds, he led his regiment, inciting the men to greater action by word and example until again severely wounded.
—	James Barnum	Navy	Boatswain's Mate	(United States Navy) USS New Ironsides	Aboard USS New Ironsides, First and Second Battles of Fort Fisher	Dec 1864 – Jan 1865	Barnum served on board the U.S.S. New Ironsides during action in several attacks on Fort Fisher, 24 and 25 December 1864; and on 13, 14, and 15 January 1865 and was commended for highly meritorious conduct during this period.
—	Charles L. Barrell	Army	First Lieutenant	102nd Regiment United States Colored Troops	near Camden, S.C.	Apr 1865	Hazardous service in marching through the enemy's country to bring relief to his command.
—	Jesse T. Barrick	Army	Corporal	3rd Regiment Minnesota Volunteer Infantry	near Duck River, Tenn.	May 26, 1863 – Jun 2, 1863	While on a scout captured single-handed 2 desperate Confederate guerrilla officers who were together and well armed at the time.
—	William H. Barringer	Army	Private	4th Regiment West Virginia Volunteer Infantry	Battle of Vicksburg, Miss.	May 22, 1863	Gallantry in the charge of the "volunteer storming party.
—	Augustus Barry	Army	Sergeant Major	(United States) 11th Regiment, U.S. Infantry	Unknown	1863 – 1865	Gallantry in various actions during the rebellion.
—	Gurdon H. Barter	Navy	Landsman	(United States Navy) USS Minnesota	USS Minnesota Landing Party, Second Battle of Fort Fisher	Jan 15, 1865	On board the U.S.S. Minnesota in action during the assault on Fort Fisher, 15 January 1865.
—	Thomas Barton	Navy	Seaman	(United States Navy) USS Hunchback	Aboard USS Hunchback	October 3, 1862	On board the U.S.S. Hunchback in the attack on Franklin, Virginia, 3 October 1862. When an ignited shell, with cartridge attached, fell out of the howitzer upon the deck, S/man Barton promptly seized a pail of water and threw it upon the missile, thereby preventing it from exploding.
—	David L. Bass	Navy	Seaman	(United States Navy) USS Minnesota	USS Minnesota Landing Party, Second Battle of Fort Fisher	Jan 15, 1865	On board the U.S.S. Minnesota in action during the assault on Fort Fisher, 15 January 1865.
	Richard N. Batchelder	Army	Lieutenant Colonel and Chief Quartermaster	(United States) II Corps, Army of the Potomac	Between Catlett and Fairfax Stations, Virginia	Oct 13, 1863 – Oct 15, 1863	Being ordered to move his trains by a continuous day-and-night march, and without the usual military escort, armed his teamsters and personally commanded them, successfully fighting against heavy odds and bringing his trains through without the loss of a wagon.
	Delevan Bates	Army	Colonel	(New York (state)) 121st Regiment New York Volunteer Infantry	Cemetery Hill, Virginia	Jul 30, 1864	Gallantry in action where he fell, shot through the face, at the head of his regiment.
	Norman F. Bates	Army	Sergeant	4th Regiment Iowa Volunteer Cavalry	Columbus, Ga.	Apr 16, 1865	Capture of flag and bearer.
—	Philip Baybutt	Army	Private	2nd Regiment Massachusetts Volunteer Cavalry	Valley Campaigns of 1864, Luray, Virginia	Sep 24, 1864	Capture of flag.
—	Philip Bazaar	Navy	Ordinary Seaman	(United States Navy) USS Santiago de Cuba	USS Santiago de Cuba Landing Party, Second Battle of Fort Fisher	Jan 15, 1865	On board the U.S.S. Santiago de Cuba during the assault on Fort Fisher on 15 January 1865.
—	Alexander M. Beatty	Army	Captain	3rd Regiment Vermont Volunteer Infantry	Battle of Cold Harbor, Virginia	Jun 5, 1864	Removed, under a hot fire, a wounded member of his command to a place of safety.
Head and shoulders of a black man with wavy hair and mustache wearing a jacket with stripes on the upper sleeves and two medals hanging from ribbons on his left breast. He left arm is propped on an object to his side.	Powhatan Beaty	Army	First Sergeant	5th Regiment United States Colored Troops	Battle of Chaffin's Farm, Virginia	Sep 29, 1864	Took command of his company, all the officers having been killed or wounded, and gallantly led it.
—	Jean J. Beaufort	Army	Corporal	2nd Regiment Louisiana Volunteer Infantry (Union)	At Port Hudson, La	about May 20, 1863	Volunteered to go within the enemy's lines and at the head of a party of 8 destroyed a signal station, thereby greatly aiding in the operations against Port Hudson that immediately followed.
—	Eugene B. Beaumont	Army	Major and Assistant Adjutant General	(United States) 4th U.S. Cavalry Regiment	Harpeth River, Tenn. and Battle of Selma, Ala.	Dec 17, 1864 and Apr 2, 1865	Obtained permission from the corps commander to advance upon the enemy's position with the 4th U.S. Cavalry, of which he was a lieutenant; led an attack upon a battery, dispersed the enemy, and captured the guns. At Selma, Ala., charged, at the head of his regiment, into the second and last line of the enemy's works.
Edward J. Bebb Butler County Ohio 4th Regiment Iowa Volunteer Cavalry MoH	Edward J. Bebb	Army	Private	4th Regiment Iowa Volunteer Cavalry	Columbus, Ga.	Apr 16, 1865	Capture of flag.
—	Wallace A. Beckwith	Army	Private	21st Regiment Connecticut Volunteer Infantry	Battle of Fredericksburg, Virginia	Dec 13, 1862	Gallantly responded to a call for volunteers to man a battery, serving with great heroism until the termination of the engagement.
—	Richard Beddows	Army	Private	(New York (state)) 34th New York Battery	Battle of Spotsylvania Court House, Virginia	May 18, 1864	Brought his guidon off in safety under a heavy fire of musketry after he had lost it by his horse becoming furious from the bursting of a shell.
Head of a man with mustache wearing a military cap and a jacket with a rectangular patch on each shoulder.	William S. Beebe	Army	First Lieutenant	(United States) U.S. Army Ordnance	Cane River Crossing, Louisiana	Apr 23, 1864	Voluntarily led a successful assault on a fortified position.
—	John P. Beech	Army	Sergeant	4th Regiment New Jersey Volunteer Infantry	Battle of Spotsylvania Court House, Virginia	May 12, 1864	Voluntarily assisted in working the guns of a battery, all the members of which had been killed or wounded.
—	Terrence Begley*	Army	Sergeant	(New York (state)) 7th Regiment New York Volunteer Heavy Artillery	Battle of Cold Harbor, Virginia	Jun 3, 1864	Shot a Confederate color bearer, rushed forward and seized his colors, and although exposed to heavy fire, regained the lines in safety.
—	Thomas Belcher	Army	Private	9th Regiment Maine Volunteer Infantry	Battle of Chaffin's Farm, Virginia	Sep 29, 1864	Took a guidon from the hands of the bearer, mortally wounded, and advanced with it nearer to the battery than any other man.
George H. Bell	George H. Bell	Navy	Captain of the Afterguard	(United States Navy) USS Santee	Aboard USS Santee, cutting out expedition in Galveston Bay	November 7, 1861	Although severely wounded in the encounter, he displayed extraordinary courage under the most painful and trying circumstances.
—	James B. Bell	Army	Sergeant	11th Regiment Ohio Volunteer Infantry	Battle of Missionary Ridge, Tenn.	Nov 25, 1863	Though severely wounded, was first of his regiment on the summit of the ridge, planted his colors inside the enemy's works, and did not leave the field until after he had been wounded 5 times.
George Grenville Benedict	George Grenville Benedict	Army	Second Lieutenant	12th Regiment Vermont Volunteer Infantry	Battle of Gettysburg, Pa.	Jul 3, 1863	Passed through a murderous fire of grape and canister in delivering orders and re-formed the crowded lines.
—	John F. Benjamin	Army	Corporal	(New York (state)) 2nd Regiment New York Volunteer Cavalry	Battle of Sayler's Creek, Virginia	Apr 6, 1865	Capture of battle flag of 9th Virginia Infantry (C.S.A.).
Head and shoulders of a white man with a bushy Van Dyke mustache, wearing a jacket with buttons down the center and rectangular patches on each shoulder.	Samuel N. Benjamin	Army	First Lieutenant	(United States) 2nd U.S. Artillery, Battery E Chief of Artillery, IX Corps	From Bull Run to Spotsylvania, Virginia	Jul 1861 – May 1864	Particularly distinguished services as an artillery officer.
—	Orren Bennett	Army	Private	141st Regiment Pennsylvania Volunteer Infantry	Battle of Sayler's Creek, Virginia	Apr 6, 1865	Capture of flag.
—	Orson W. Bennett	Army	First Lieutenant	102nd Regiment United States Colored Troops	Battle of Honey Hill	Nov 30, 1864	After several unsuccessful efforts to recover 3 pieces of abandoned artillery, this officer gallantly led a small force fully 100 yards in advance of the Union lines and brought in the guns, preventing their capture.
Head and torso of a white man sitting sideways in a chair, his right arm resting on the chairback. He has a thin mustache, curly hair, and is wearing a military jacket.	William Bensinger	Army	Private	21st Regiment Ohio Volunteer Infantry	Great Locomotive Chase, Ga.	Apr 1862	Second person to receive Medal of Honor
Gold-framed portrait of a white man with brown hair, mustache, and bushy sideburns with his arms crossed. He is wearing a blue military jacket with yellow buttons down the center and a yellow patch on the shoulder.	William H. H. Benyaurd	Army	First Lieutenant	United States Army Corps of Engineers	Battle of Five Forks, Virginia	Apr 1, 1865	With one companion, voluntarily advanced in a reconnaissance beyond the skirmishers, where he was exposed to imminent peril; also, in the same battle, rode to the front with the commanding general to encourage wavering troops to resume the advance, which they did successfully.
—	Asa Betham	Navy	Coxswain	(United States Navy) USS Pontoosuc	Aboard USS Pontoosuc, First and Second Battles of Fort Fisher	December 24, 1864 – January 22, 1865	Served on board the U.S.S. Pontoosuc during the capture of Fort Fisher and Wilmington, 24 December 1864, to 22 January 1865. Carrying out his duties faithfully during this period, Betham was recommended for gallantry and skill and for his cool courage while under the fire of the enemy throughout these various actions.
	Charles M. Betts	Army	Lieutenant Colonel	15th Regiment Pennsylvania Volunteer Cavalry	Greensboro, North Carolina	Apr 19, 1865	With a force of but 75 men, while on a scouting expedition, by a judicious disposition of his men, surprised and captured an entire battalion of the enemy's cavalry.
	Hillary Beyer	Army	Second Lieutenant	90th Regiment Pennsylvania Volunteer Infantry	Battle of Antietam, Md.	Sep 17, 1862	After his command had been forced to fall back, remained alone on the line of battle, caring for his wounded comrades and carrying one of them to a place of safety.
—	Charles J. Bibber	Navy	Gunner's Mate	(United States Navy) USS Agawam	Aboard USS Agawam, First Battle of Fort Fisher	December 23, 1864	Bibber served on board the U.S.S. Agawam, as one of a volunteer crew of a powder boat which was exploded near Fort Fisher 23 December 1864.
—	Henry H. Bickford	Army	Corporal	90th Regiment Pennsylvania Volunteer Infantry	Battle of Waynesboro, Virginia	Mar 2, 1865	Recapture of flag.
—	John F. Bickford	Navy	Captain of the Top	(United States Navy) USS Kearsarge	Aboard USS Kearsarge off Cherbourg, France	June 19, 1864	Served on board the U.S.S. Kearsarge when she destroyed the Alabama off Cherbourg, France, 19 June 1864.
	Matthew Bickford	Army	Corporal	8th Missouri Volunteer Infantry	Battle of Vicksburg, Miss.	May 22, 1863	Gallantry in the charge of the "volunteer storming party.
—	Charles Bieger	Army	Private	4th Regiment Missouri Volunteer Cavalry	Ivy Farm, Miss.	Feb 22, 1864	Voluntarily risked his life by taking a horse, under heavy fire, beyond the line of battle for the rescue of his captain, whose horse had been killed in a charge and who was surrounded by the enemy's skirmishers.
Head and shoulders of a white man with mustache wearing a tuxedo and white bow tie. The portrait is surrounded by a decorative oval-shaped frame.	Richard Binder	Marine Corps	Sergeant	(United States Marine Corps) USS Ticonderoga	Aboard USS Ticonderoga, First and Second Battles of Fort Fisher	Jan 15, 1865	Despite heavy return fire by the enemy and the explosion of the 100-pounder Parrott rifle which killed 8 men and wounded 12 more, Sgt. Binder, as captain of a gun, performed his duties with skill and courage during the first 2 days of battle.
Head of a balding white man with a bushy mustache wearing pince-nez glasses and a dark suit over a light-colored shirt and tie. The portrait is framed by laurel wreaths on the bottom and the words "HON. HENRY H. BINGHAM" are below.	Henry H. Bingham	Army	Captain	140th Regiment Pennsylvania Volunteer Infantry	Battle of the Wilderness, Virginia	May 6, 1864	Rallied and led into action a portion of the troops who had given way under fierce assaults by the enemy.
—	Horatio L. Birdsall	Army	Sergeant	3rd Regiment Iowa Volunteer Cavalry	Columbus, Ga.	Apr 16, 1865	Capture of flag and bearer.
—	Francis A. Bishop	Army	Private	57th Regiment Pennsylvania Volunteer Infantry	Battle of Spotsylvania Court House, Virginia	May 12, 1864	Capture of flag
Profile of an older white man with a mustache and bushy goatee wearing a dark suit over a light-colored shirt and tie.	John C. Black	Army	Lieutenant Colonel	11th Regiment Indiana Volunteer Infantry	Battle of Prairie Grove, Ark.	Dec 7, 1862	Brother of William P. Black, one of 5 pairs of brothers to be awarded the Medal of Honor.
Head and shoulders of an older white man with a bushy beard wearing a suit coat, vest, and bow tie.	William P. Black	Army	Captain	11th Regiment Indiana Volunteer Infantry	Battle of Pea Ridge, Ark.	Mar 7, 1862	Brother of John C. Black, one of 5 pairs of brothers to be awarded the Medal of Honor.
William R. D. Blackwood, surgeon who was awarded the Medal of Honor for actions in the American Civil War.	Wilmon W. Blackmar	Army	Lieutenant	1st Regiment West Virginia Volunteer Cavalry	Battle of Five Forks, Virginia	Apr 1, 1865	At a critical stage of the battle, without orders, led a successful advance upon the enemy.
William R. D. Blackwood, surgeon who was awarded the Medal of Honor for actions in the American Civil War.	William R. D. Blackwood	Army	Surgeon	48th Regiment Pennsylvania Volunteer Infantry	Third Battle of Petersburg, Virginia	Apr 2, 1865	Removed severely wounded officers and soldiers from the field while under a heavy fire from the enemy, exposing himself beyond the call of duty, thus furnishing an example of most distinguished gallantry.
—	William Blagheen	Navy	Ship's Cook	(United States Navy) USS Brooklyn	Aboard USS Brooklyn, Battle of Mobile Bay	August 5, 1864	On board the U.S.S. Brooklyn during successful attacks against Fort Morgan, rebel gunboats and the ram Tennessee in Mobile Bay, on 5 August 1864.
—	Robert M. Blair	Navy	Boatswain's Mate	(United States Navy) USS Pontoosuc	Aboard USS Pontoosuc, First and Second Battles of Fort Fisher	December 24, 1864 – January 22, 1865	Served on board the U.S.S. Pontoosuc during the capture of Fort Fisher and Wilmington, 24 December 1864 to 22 January 1865.
	Robert Blake	Navy	Contraband	(United States Navy) USS Marblehead	Aboard USS Marblehead off Legareville, Stono River	Dec 25, 1863	Escaped slave. First African-American Medal of Honor recipient.
—	Thomas A. Blasdel	Army	Private	83rd Regiment Indiana Volunteer Infantry	Battle of Vicksburg, Miss.	May 22, 1863	Gallantry in the charge of the "volunteer storming party.
corporal milton blickensderfer 104th regiment, ohio volunteer infantry moh	Milton Blickensderfer	Army	Corporal	126th Regiment Ohio Volunteer Infantry	Petersburg, Virginia	Apr 3, 1865	Capture of flag
—	George N. Bliss	Army	Captain	1st Regiment Rhode Island Volunteer Cavalry	Battle of Waynesboro, Virginia	Sep 28, 1864	While in command of the provost guard in the village, he saw the Union lines returning before the attack of a greatly superior force of the enemy, mustered his guard, and, without orders, joined in the defense and charged the enemy without support. He received three saber wounds, his horse was shot, and he was taken prisoner.
Head of a portly white man with a thin, pointed mustache wearing a double-breasted military jacket with shoulder boards.	Zenas R. Bliss	Army	Colonel	7th Regiment Rhode Island Volunteer Infantry	Battle of Fredericksburg, Virginia	Dec 13, 1862	This officer, to encourage his regiment; which had never before been in action, and which had been ordered to lie down to protect itself from the enemy's fire, arose to his feet, advanced in front of the line, and himself fired several shots at the enemy at short range, being fully exposed to their fire at the time
—	Welis H. Blodgett	Army	First Lieutenant	37th Regiment Illinois Volunteer Infantry	First Battle of Newtonia, Mo.	Sep 30, 1862	With a single orderly, captured an armed picket of 8 men and marched them in prisoners.
—	Charles Blucher	Army	Corporal	188th Regiment Pennsylvania Volunteer Infantry	Fort Harrison, Battle of Chaffin's Farm, Virginia	Sep 29, 1864	Planted first national colors on the fortifications.
John W. Blunt	John W. Blunt	Army	First Lieutenant	(New York (state)) 6th Regiment New York Volunteer Cavalry	Battle of Cedar Creek, Virginia	Oct 19, 1864	Voluntarily led a charge across a narrow bridge over the creek against the lines of the enemy.
—	Peter M. Boehm	Army	Second Lieutenant	(New York (state)) 15th Regiment New York Volunteer Cavalry	Battle of Dinwiddie Court House, Virginia	Mar 31, 1865	While acting as aide to General Custer, took a flag from the hands of color bearer, rode in front of a line that was being driven back and, under a heavy fire, rallied the men, re-formed the line, and repulsed the charge.
—	Frank Bois	Navy	Quartermaster	(United States Navy) USS Cincinnati	Aboard USS Cincinnati, Operations against Vicksburg	May 27, 1863	Served as quartermaster on board the U.S.S. Cincinnati during the attack on the Vicksburg batteries and at the time of her sinking, 27 May 1863.
—	William S. Bond	Navy	Boatswain's Mate	(United States Navy) USS Kearsarge	Aboard USS Kearsarge off Cherbourg, France	June 19, 1864	Served on board the U.S.S. Kearsarge when she destroyed the Alabama off Cherbourg, France, 19 June 1864. Carrying out his duties courageously, Bond exhibited marked coolness and good conduct and was highly recommended for his gallantry under fire by his divisional officer.
—	Henry G. Bonebrake	Army	Lieutenant	17th Regiment Pennsylvania Volunteer Cavalry	Battle of Five Forks, Virginia	Apr 1, 1865	As 1 of the first of Devin's Division to enter the works, he fought in a hand-to-hand struggle with a Confederate to capture his flag by superior physical strength.
—	Sylvester Bonnaffon, Jr.	Army	First Lieutenant	99th Regiment Pennsylvania Volunteer Infantry	Battle of Boydton Plank Road, Virginia	Oct 27, 1864	Checked the rout and rallied the troops of his command in the face of a terrible fire of musketry; was severely wounded.
—	Robert Boody	Army	Sergeant	(New York (state)) 40th Regiment New York Volunteer Infantry	Battle of Williamsburg, Virginia and Battle of Chancellorsville, Virginia	May 5, 1862 and May 2, 1863	This soldier, at Williamsburg, Virginia, then a corporal, at great personal risk, voluntarily saved the lives of and brought from the battlefield 2 wounded comrades. A year later, at Chancellorsville, voluntarily, and at great personal risk, brought from the field of battle and saved the life of Capt. George B. Carse, Company C, 40th New York Volunteer Infantry.
—	Hugh P. Boon	Army	Captain	1st Regiment West Virginia Volunteer Cavalry	Battle of Sayler's Creek, Virginia	Apr 6, 1865	Capture of flag
Head and torso of a white man with a long goatee, wearing a wide-brimmed hat, bow tie, and dark suit coat.	Nicholas Bouquet	Army	Private	1st Regiment Iowa Volunteer Infantry	Battle of Wilson's Creek, Mo.	Aug 10, 1861	Voluntarily left the line of battle, and, exposing himself to imminent danger from a heavy fire of the enemy, assisted in capturing a riderless horse at large between the lines and hitching him to a disabled gun, saved the gun from capture.
	Orlando Boss	Army	Corporal	25th Regiment Massachusetts Volunteer Infantry	Battle of Cold Harbor, Virginia	Jun 3, 1864	Rescued his lieutenant, who was lying between the lines mortally wounded; this under a heavy fire of the enemy.
Profile of a balding white man with bushy, drooping mustache wearing an ornate military jacket with shoulder boards, shoulder cords, and a lanyard hanging from the chest.	John G. Bourke	Army	Private	15th Regiment Pennsylvania Volunteer Cavalry	Battle of Stones River, Tenn.	Dec 31, 1862 – Jan 1, 1863	Gallantry in action.
—	Thomas Bourne	Navy	Seaman and Gun Captain	(United States Navy) USS Varuna	Aboard USS Varuna, Battle of Forts Jackson and St. Philip	April 24, 1862	During this action at extremely close range while his ship was under furious fire and was twice rammed by the rebel ship Morgan, Bourne remained steadfast at his gun and was instrumental in inflicting damage on the enemy until the Varuna, badly damaged and forced to beach, was finally sunk.
sergeant richard boury (1830 - 1914) moh 1st regiment west virginia volunteer cavalry - company c	Richard Boury	Army	Sergeant	1st Regiment West Virginia Volunteer Cavalry	Charlottesville, Virginia	Mar 5, 1865	Capture of flag
—	John W. Boutwell	Army	Private	18th Regiment New Hampshire Volunteer Infantry	Third Battle of Petersburg, Virginia	Apr 2, 1865	Brought off from the picket line, under heavy fire, a comrade who had been shot through both legs.
—	Chester B. Bowen	Army	Corporal	(New York (state)) 1st Regiment New York Dragoons	Battle of Opequon, Virginia	Sep 19, 1864	Capture of flag.
—	Emmer Bowen	Army	Private	127th Regiment Illinois Volunteer Infantry	Battle of Vicksburg	May 22, 1863	Gallantry in the charge of the "volunteer storming party"
—	Edward R. Bowman	Navy	Quartermaster	(United States Navy) USS Ticonderoga	Aboard USS Ticonderoga, Second Battle of Fort Fisher	January 13, 1865 – January 15, 1865	On board the U.S.S. Ticonderoga during attacks on Fort Fisher 13 to 15 January 1865.
—	Thomas J. Box	Army	Captain	27th Regiment Indiana Volunteer Infantry	Battle of Resaca, Ga.	May 14, 1864	Capture of flag of the 38th Alabama Infantry (C.S.A.).
Henry V. Boynton	Henry V. Boynton	Army	Lieutenant Colonel	35th Regiment Ohio Volunteer Infantry	Battle of Missionary Ridge, Tenn.	Nov 25, 1863	Led his regiment in the face of a severe fire of the enemy; was severely wounded.
—	Amos Bradley	Navy	Landsman	(United States Navy) USS Varuna	Aboard USS Varuna, Battle of Forts Jackson and St. Philip	April 24, 1862	Served on board the U.S.S. Varuna in one of the most responsible positions, during the attacks on Forts Jackson and St. Philip, and while in action against the rebel ship Morgan, 24 April 1862.
—	Charles Bradley	Navy	Boatswain's Mate	(United States Navy) USS Louisville	Aboard USS Louisville, Battle of Fort Hindman	January 10, 1863 – January 11, 1863	Carrying out his duties through the thick of battle and acting as captain of a 9-inch gun, Bradley consistently showed, "Attention to duty, bravery, and coolness in action against the enemy."
	Thomas W. Bradley	Army	Sergeant	(New York (state)) 124th Regiment New York Volunteer Infantry	Battle of Chancellorsville, Virginia	May 3, 1863	Volunteered in response to a call and alone, in the face of a heavy fire of musketry and canister, went and procured ammunition for the use of his comrades.
—	James Brady	Army	Private	10th Regiment New Hampshire Volunteer Infantry	Battle of Chaffin's Farm, Virginia	Sep 29, 1864	Capture of flag
—	Joseph E. Brandle	Army	Private	17th Regiment Michigan Volunteer Infantry	Lenoire, Tenn.	Nov 16, 1863	While color bearer of his regiment, having been twice wounded and the sight of one eye destroyed, still held to the colors until ordered to the rear by his regimental commander.
—	Felix Brannigan	Army	Private	(New York (state)) 74th Regiment New York Volunteer Infantry	Battle of Chancellorsville, Virginia	May 2, 1863	Volunteered on a dangerous service and brought in valuable information.
—	William Brant	Army	Lieutenant	1st Regiment New Jersey Volunteer Infantry	Petersburg, Virginia	Apr 3, 1865	Capture of battle flag of 46th North Carolina (C.S.A.).
—	Edgar A. Bras	Army	Sergeant	8th Regiment Iowa Volunteer Infantry	Battle of Spanish Fort, Ala.	Apr 8, 1865	Capture of flag.
—	John Brazell	Navy	Quartermaster	(United States Navy) USS Richmond	Aboard USS Richmond, Battle of Mobile Bay	August 5, 1864	Served on board the U.S.S. Richmond in the action at Mobile Bay, 5 August 1864, where he was recommended for coolness and good conduct as a gun captain during that engagement which resulted in the capture of the rebel ram Tennessee and in the destruction of Fort Morgan. Brazell served gallantly throughout the actions with Forts Jackson and St. Philip, the Chalmettes, batteries below Vicksburg, and was present at the surrender of New Orleans while on board the U.S.S. Brooklyn.
—	John Breen	Navy	Boatswain's Mate	(United States Navy) USS Commodore Perry	Aboard USS Commodore Perry	October 3, 1862	On board the U.S.S. Commodore Perry in the attack upon Franklin, Virginia, 3 October 1862. With enemy fire raking the deck of his ship and blockades thwarting her progress, Breen remained at his post and performed his duties with skill and courage as the Commodore Perry fought a gallant battle to silence many rebel batteries as she steamed down the Blackwater River.
—	Christopher Brennan	Navy	Seaman	(United States Navy) USS Mississippi	Aboard USS Mississippi, Battle of Forts Jackson and St. Philip	April 24, 1862 – April 25, 1862	On board the U.S.S. Mississippi during attacks on Forts Jackson and St. Philip and during the taking of New Orleans, 24–25 April 1862. Taking part in the actions which resulted in the damaging of the Mississippi and several casualties on it, Brennan showed skill and courage throughout the entire engagements which resulted in the taking of St. Philip and Jackson and in the surrender of New Orleans.
	Lewis F. Brest	Army	Private	57th Regiment Pennsylvania Volunteer Infantry	Battle of Sayler's Creek, Virginia	Apr 6, 1865	Capture of flag.
—	William J. Brewer	Army	Private	(New York (state)) 2nd Regiment New York Volunteer Cavalry	Appomattox campaign, Virginia	Apr 4, 1865	Capture of engineer flag, Army of Northern Virginia.
—	Charles Breyer	Army	Sergeant	90th Regiment Pennsylvania Volunteer Infantry	First Battle of Rappahannock Station, Virginia	Aug 23, 1862	Voluntarily, and at great personal risk, picked up an unexploded shell and threw it away, thus doubtless saving the life of a comrade whose arm had been taken off by the same shell.
—	Elijah A. Briggs	Army	Corporal	2nd Regiment Connecticut Volunteer Heavy Artillery	Petersburg, Virginia	Apr 3, 1865	Capture of battle flag.
—	Andrew Bringle	Army	Corporal	(New York (state)) 10th Regiment New York Volunteer Cavalry	Battle of Sayler's Creek, Virginia	Apr 6, 1865	Charged the enemy and assisted Sgt. Norton in capturing a fieldpiece and 2 prisoners.
—	Andrew Brinn	Navy	Seaman	(United States Navy) USS Mississippi	Aboard USS Mississippi	March 14, 1863	Served on board the U.S.S. Mississippi during her abandonment and firing in the engagement at Port Hudson, 14 March 1863
—	August F. Bronner	Army	Private	(New York (state)) Battery C, 1st Battalion, New York Volunteer Light Artillery	Battle of White Oak Swamp, Virginia and Battle of Malvern Hill, Virginia	Jun 30, 1862 and Jul 1, 1862	Continued to fight after being severely wounded.
—	James H. Bronson	Army	First Sergeant	5th Regiment United States Colored Troops	Battle of Chaffin's Farm, Virginia	Sep 29, 1864	Took command of his company, all the officers having been killed or wounded, and gallantly led it.
—	John Brosnan	Army	Sergeant	(New York (state)) 164th Regiment New York Volunteer Infantry	Second Battle of Petersburg, Virginia	Jun 17, 1864	Rescued a wounded comrade who lay exposed to the enemy's fire, receiving a severe wound in the effort.
—	Charles W. Brouse	Army	Captain	100th Regiment Indiana Volunteer Infantry	Battle of Missionary Ridge, Tenn.	Nov 25, 1863	To encourage his men whom he had ordered to lie down while under severe fire, and who were partially protected by slight earthworks, himself refused to lie down, but walked along the top of the works until he fell severely wounded.
—	Charles Brown	Army	Sergeant	50th Regiment Pennsylvania Volunteer Infantry	Battle of Globe Tavern, Virginia	Aug 19, 1864	Capture of flag of 47th Virginia Infantry (C.S.A.).
—	Edward Brown, Jr.	Army	Corporal	(New York (state)) 62nd Regiment New York Volunteer Infantry	Second Battle of Fredericksburg and Salem Heights, Virginia	May 3, 1863 – May 4, 1863	Severely wounded while carrying the colors, he continued at his post, under fire, until ordered to the rear.
	Henri Le Fevre Brown	Army	Sergeant	(New York (state)) 72nd Regiment New York Volunteer Infantry	Battle of the Wilderness, Virginia	May 6, 1864	Voluntarily and under a heavy fire from the enemy, 3 times crossed the field of battle with a load of ammunition in a blanket on his back, thus supplying the Federal forces, whose ammunition had nearly all been expended, and enabling them to hold their position until reinforcement arrived, when the enemy were driven from their position.
—	James Brown	Navy	Quartermaster	(United States Navy) USS Albatross	Aboard USS Albatross, Fort DeRussy	May 4, 1863	Served on board the U.S.S. Albatross during action against Fort DeRussy in the Red River Area on 4 May 1863.
	Jeremiah Z. Brown	Army	Captain	148th Regiment Pennsylvania Volunteer Infantry	Petersburg, Virginia	Oct 27, 1864	With 100 selected volunteers, assaulted and captured the works of the enemy, together with a number of officers and men.
—	John Brown	Navy	Captain of the Forecastle	USS Brooklyn	Aboard USS Brooklyn, Battle of Mobile Bay	August 5, 1864	On board the U.S.S. Brooklyn during action against rebel forts and gunboats and with the ram Tennessee in Mobile Bay, 5 August 1864.
—	John H. Brown	Army	First Sergeant	47th Regiment Ohio Volunteer Infantry	Battle of Vicksburg, Miss.	May 19, 1863	Voluntarily carried a verbal message from Col. A. C. Parry to Gen. Hugh Ewing through a terrific fire and in plain view of the enemy.
—	John Harties Brown	Army	Captain	12th Regiment Kentucky Volunteer Infantry	Second Battle of Franklin, Tenn.	Nov 30, 1864	Capture of flag.
—	Morris Brown, Jr.*	Army	Captain	(New York (state)) 126th Regiment New York Volunteer Infantry	Battle of Gettysburg, Pa.	Jul 3, 1863	Capture of flag.
—	Robert Brown	Navy	Captain of the Top	(United States Navy) USS Richmond	Aboard USS Richmond, Battle of Mobile Bay	August 5, 1864	On board the U.S.S. Richmond in action at Mobile Bay on 5 August 1864.
Robert B. Brown	Robert B. Brown	Army	Private	15th Regiment Ohio Volunteer Infantry	Battle of Missionary Ridge, Tenn.	Nov 25, 1863	Upon reaching the ridge through concentrated fire, he approached the color bearer of the 9th Mississippi Infantry (C.S.A.), demanded his surrender with threatening gesture and took him prisoner with his regimental flag.
Uriah H. Brown	Uriah Brown	Army	Private	30th Regiment Ohio Volunteer Infantry	Battle of Vicksburg, Miss.	May 22, 1863	Despite the death of his captain at his side during the assault he continued carrying his log to the defense ditch. While he was laying his log in place he was shot down and thrown into the water. Unmindful of his own wound he, despite the intense fire, dragged 5 of his comrades from the ditch, wherein they lay wounded, to a place of safety.
—	William H. Brown	Navy	Landsman	(United States Navy) USS Brooklyn	Aboard USS Brooklyn, Battle of Mobile Bay	August 5, 1864	On board the U.S.S. Brooklyn during successful attacks against Fort Morgan rebel gunboats and the ram Tennessee in Mobile Bay on 5 August 1864.
—	Wilson Brown	Navy	Landsman	(United States Navy) USS Hartford	Aboard USS Hartford, Battle of Mobile Bay	Aug 5, 1864	On board the flagship U.S.S. Hartford during successful attacks against Fort Morgan, rebel gunboats and the ram Tennessee in Mobile Bay on 5 August 1864.
Head and shoulders of a white man with a thin mustache, wearing a cavalry hat, vest, and dark jacket.	Wilson W. Brown	Army	Private	21st Regiment Ohio Volunteer Infantry	Great Locomotive Chase, Ga.	Apr 1862	One of the 19 of 22 men (including 2 civilians) who, by direction of Gen. Mitchell (or Buell), penetrated nearly 200 miles south into enemy territory and captured a railroad train at Big Shanty, Ga., in an attempt to destroy the bridges and track between Chattanooga and Atlanta.
Full-body portrait of a white soldier with a rifle and bayonet by his side, standing on a crumpled flag. He is wearing baggy pants tucked into his boots, a short, decorative jacket buttoned at the top only, and a slouch cap.	Francis E. Brownell	Army	Private	(New York (state)) 11th Regiment New York Volunteer Infantry	Alexandria, Virginia	May 24, 1861	Killed the murderer of Colonel Ellsworth at the Marshall House Alexandria, Virginia First Civil War deed to merit Medal of Honor.
—	William P. Brownell	Navy	Coxswain	(United States Navy) USS Benton	Aboard USS Benton, Battle of Grand Gulf and Siege of Vicksburg	May 2, 1863 and May 22, 1863	Served as coxswain on board the U.S.S. Benton during the attack on Great Gulf Bay, 2 May 1863, and Vicksburg, 22 May 1863. Carrying out his duties with coolness and courage, Brownell served gallantly against the enemy as captain of a 9-inch gun in the attacks on Great Gulf and Vicksburg and as a member of the Battery Benton before Vicksburg.
	Louis J. Bruner	Army	Private	5th Regiment Indiana Volunteer Cavalry	Walkers Ford, Tenn.	Dec 2, 1863	Voluntarily passed through the enemy's lines under fire and conveyed to a battalion, then in a perilous position and liable to capture, information which enabled it to reach a point of safety.
	George W. Brush	Army	First Lieutenant	34th Regiment United States Colored Troops	Ashepoo River, S.C.	May 24, 1864	Voluntarily commanded a boat crew, which went to the rescue of a large number of Union soldiers on board the stranded steamer Boston, and with great gallantry succeeded in conveying them to shore, being exposed during the entire time to heavy fire from a Confederate battery.
—	Christopher C. Bruton	Army	Captain	(New York (state)) 22nd Regiment New York Volunteer Cavalry	Battle of Waynesboro, Virginia	Mar 2, 1865	Last name sometimes spelled "Braton"
—	Henry Brutsche	Navy	Landsman	(United States Navy) USS Tacony	Aboard USS Tacony, Plymouth, North Carolina	October 31, 1864	Served on board the USS Tacony during the taking of Plymouth, North Carolina, 31 October 1864. Carrying out his duties faithfully during the capture of Plymouth, Brutsche distinguished himself by a display of coolness when he participated in landing and spiking a 9-inch gun while under a devastating fire from enemy musketry. (Henry was eighteen years old at the time) Henry is buried in Lawnview Cemetery, Rockledge, Pennsylvania.
—	Andrew S. Bryant	Army	Sergeant	46th Regiment Massachusetts Volunteer Infantry	New Bern, North Carolina	May 23, 1863	By his courage and judicious disposition of his guard of 16 men, stationed in a small earthwork at the head of the bridge, held in check and repulsed for a half hour a fierce attack of a strong force of the enemy, thus probably saving the city New Bern from capture.
—	George A. Buchanan*	Army	Private	(New York (state)) 148th Regiment New York Volunteer Infantry	Battle of Chaffin's Farm, Virginia	Sep 29, 1864	Took position in advance of the skirmish line and drove the enemy's cannoneers from their guns; was mortally wounded.
—	F. Clarence Buck	Army	Corporal	21st Regiment Connecticut Volunteer Infantry	Battle of Chaffin's Farm, Virginia	Sep 29, 1864	Although wounded, refused to leave the field until the fight closed.
—	James Buck	Navy	Quartermaster	(United States Navy) USS Brooklyn	Aboard USS Brooklyn, Battle of Forts Jackson and St. Philip	April 24, 1862 – April 25, 1862	Served on board the U.S.S. Brooklyn in the attack upon Forts Jackson and St. Philip and at the taking of New Orleans, 24 and 25 April 1862.
—	David E. Buckingham	Army	First Lieutenant	4th Regiment Delaware Volunteer Infantry	Rowanty Creek, Virginia	Feb 5, 1865	Swam the partly frozen creek, under fire, in the attempt to capture a crossing.
—	Abram J. Buckles	Army	Sergeant	19th Regiment Indiana Volunteer Infantry	Battle of the Wilderness, Virginia	May 5, 1864	Though suffering from an open wound, carried the regimental colors until again wounded.
—	Denis Buckley*	Army	Private	(New York (state)) 136th Regiment New York Volunteer Infantry	Battle of Peachtree Creek, Ga.	Jul 20, 1864	Capture of flag of 31st Mississippi (C.S.A.).
	John C. Buckley	Army	Sergeant	4th Regiment West Virginia Volunteer Infantry	Battle of Vicksburg, Miss.	May 22, 1863	Gallantry in the charge of the "volunteer storming party."
—	John K. Bucklyn	Army	First Lieutenant	Battery E, 1st Regiment Rhode Island Volunteer Light Artillery	Battle of Chancellorsville, Virginia	May 3, 1863	Though himself wounded, gallantly fought his section of the battery under a fierce fire from the enemy until his ammunition was all expended, many of the cannoneers and most of the horses killed or wounded, and the enemy within 25 yards of the guns, when, disabling one piece, he brought off the other in safety.
—	John E. Buffington	Army	Sergeant	4th Regiment Maryland Volunteer Infantry	Third Battle of Petersburg, Virginia	Apr 2, 1865	Was the first enlisted man of the 3d Division to mount the parapet of the enemy's line.
Head and shoulders of a white man with a full beard and thick hair, wearing an unbuttoned military jacket with a star-shaped medal pinned to the left breast.	Robert Buffum	Army	Private	21st Regiment Ohio Volunteer Infantry	Great Locomotive Chase, Ga.	Apr 1862	Third person to receive Medal of Honor
—	Henry G. Buhrman	Army	Private	54th Regiment Ohio Volunteer Infantry	Battle of Vicksburg, Miss.	May 22, 1863	Gallantry in the charge of the "volunteer storming party."
	William Bumgarner	Army	Sergeant	4th Regiment West Virginia Volunteer Infantry	Battle of Vicksburg, Miss.	Apr 2, 1862	Gallantry in the charge of the "volunteer storming party."
—	James H. Burbank	Army	Sergeant	4th Regiment Rhode Island Volunteer Infantry	Blackwater, near Franklin, Virginia	Oct 3, 1862	Gallantry in action while on detached service on board the gunboat Barney.
—	Joseph Burger	Army	Private	2nd Regiment Minnesota Volunteer Infantry	Nolensville, Tenn.	Feb 15, 1863	Grandfather of former Chief Justice of the United States Warren Burger.
—	E. Michael Burk	Army	Private	(New York (state)) 125th Regiment New York Volunteer Infantry	Battle of Spotsylvania Court House, Virginia	May 12, 1864	Capture of flag, seizing it as his regiment advanced over the enemy's works. He received a bullet wound in the chest while capturing flag.
—	Thomas Burk	Army	Sergeant	(New York (state)) 97th Regiment New York Volunteer Infantry	Battle of the Wilderness	May 6, 1864	At the risk of his own life went back while the rebels were still firing and, finding Col. Wheelock unable to move, alone and unaided, carried him off the field of battle.
—	Daniel W. Burke	Army	First Sergeant	(United States) 2nd Regiment U.S. Infantry	Battle of Shepherdstown, Virginia	Sep 20, 1862	Voluntarily attempted to spike a gun in the face of the enemy.
—	Thomas Burke	Army	Private	(New York (state)) 5th Regiment New York Volunteer Cavalry	Hanover Courthouse, Virginia	Jun 30, 1863	Capture of battle flag.
sgt james m burns moh 1st regiment west virginia volunteer infantry	James M. Burns	Army	Sergeant	1st Regiment West Virginia Volunteer Infantry	Battle of New Market, Virginia	May 15, 1864	Under a heavy fire of musketry, rallied a few men to the support of the colors, in danger of capture and bore them to a place of safety. One of his comrades having been severely wounded in the effort, Sgt. Burns went back a hundred yards in the face of the enemy's fire and carried the wounded man from the field.
—	John M. Burns	Navy	Seaman	(United States Navy) USS Lackawanna	Aboard USS Lackawanna, Battle of Mobile Bay	August 5, 1864	On board the U.S.S. Lackawanna during successful attacks against Fort Morgan, rebel gunboats and the ram Tennessee in Mobile Bay, on 5 August 1864.
—	William W. Burritt	Army	Private	113th Regiment Illinois Volunteer Infantry	Vicksburg, Miss.	Apr 27, 1863	Voluntarily acted as a fireman on a steam tug which ran the blockade and passed the batteries under a heavy fire.
—	Albert Burton	Navy	Seaman	(United States Navy) USS Wabash	USS Wabash Landing Party, Second Battle of Fort Fisher	Jan 15, 1865	Served on board the U.S.S. Wabash in the assault on Fort Fisher, 15 January 1865.
Head and torso of a white man with a bushy mustache and receding hairline, looking off to the side. He is wearing a double-breasted military jacket with a rectangular patch over each shoulder.	Daniel A. Butterfield	Army	Brigadier General	3rd Brigade, 1st Division, V Corps	Battle of Gaines' Mill, Virginia	Jun 27, 1862	Took up the colors and rallied the troops while under fire.
—	Frank G. Butterfield	Army	First Lieutenant	6th Regiment Vermont Volunteer Infantry	Salem Heights, Virginia	May 4, 1863	Took command of the skirmish line and covered the movement of his regiment out of a precarious position.
—	George Butts	Navy	Gunner's Mate	(United States Navy) USS Signal	Aboard USS Signal, Red River Campaign	May 5, 1864	Proceeding up the Red River, the U.S.S. Signal engaged a large force of enemy field batteries and sharpshooters, returning their fire until the ship was totally disabled, at which time the white flag was raised. Although entered on the sick list, Butts courageously carried out his duties during the entire engagement.
—	James Byrnes	Navy	Boatswain's Mate	(United States Navy) USS Louisville	Aboard USS Louisville, Battle of Fort Hindman	January 10, 1863 – January 11, 1863	Carrying out his duties through the thick of battle and acting as captain of a 9-inch gun, Brynes consistently showed "Attention to duty, bravery, and coolness in action against the enemy."

== C ==
This along with the *, indicates that the Medal of Honor was awarded posthumously

Image	Name	Service	Rank	Unit/Command	Place of action	Date of action	Notes
—	Abel G. Cadwallader	Army	Corporal	1st Maryland Infantry Regiment	Battle of Hatcher's Run, Virginia	Feb 6, 1865	Gallantly planted the colors on the enemy's works in advance of the arrival of his regiment.
—	Luman L. Cadwell	Army	Sergeant	(New York (state)) 2nd Regiment New York Veteran Volunteer Cavalry	Alabama Bayou, Louisiana	Sep 20, 1864	Swam the bayou under fire of the enemy and captured and brought off a boat by means of which the command crossed and routed the enemy.
—	Daniel Caldwell	Army	Sergeant	13th Regiment Pennsylvania Volunteer Cavalry	Battle of Hatcher's Run, Virginia	Feb 6, 1865	In a mounted charge, dashed into center of the enemy's line and captured the colors of the 33rd North Carolina Infantry.
—	Ivers S. Calkin	Army	First Sergeant	(New York (state)) 2nd New York Volunteer Cavalry Regiment	Battle of Sayler's Creek, Virginia	Apr 6, 1865	Capture of flag of 18th Virginia Infantry (C.S.A.).
—	John H. Callahan	Army	Private	122nd Illinois Volunteer Infantry Regiment	Battle of Fort Blakeley, Ala.	Apr 9, 1865	Capture of flag.
—	Carlton N. Camp	Army	Private	18th Regiment New Hampshire Volunteer Infantry	Third Battle of Petersburg, Virginia	Apr 2, 1865	Brought off from the picket line, under heavy fire, a comrade who had been shot through both legs.
—	James A. Campbell	Army	Private	(New York (state)) 2nd Regiment New York Volunteer Cavalry	Woodstock, Virginia and Amelia Courthouse, Virginia	Jan 22, 1865 and Apr 5, 1865	While his command was retreating before superior numbers at Woodstock, Virginia, he voluntarily rushed back with one companion and rescued his commanding officer, who had been unhorsed and left behind. At Amelia Courthouse captured 2 battle flags.
	William Campbell	Navy	Boatswain's Mate	(United States Navy) USS Ticonderoga	Aboard USS Ticonderoga, First and Second Battles of Fort Fisher	Dec 1864 – Jan 1865	On board the U.S.S. Ticonderoga during attacks on Fort Fisher, 24 and 25 December 1864; and 13 to 15 January 1865.
—	William Campbell	Army	Private	30th Regiment Ohio Volunteer Infantry	Battle of Vicksburg, Miss.	May 22, 1863	Gallantry in the charge of the "volunteer storming party."
	Charles E. Capehart	Army	Major	1st Regiment West Virginia Volunteer Cavalry	Monterey Mountain, Pa.	Jul 4, 1863	While commanding the regiment, charged down the mountain side at midnight, in a heavy rain, upon the enemy's fleeing wagon train. Many wagons were captured and destroyed and many prisoners taken.
	Henry Capehart	Army	Colonel	1st Regiment West Virginia Volunteer Cavalry	Greenbrier River, W. Va.	May 22, 1864	Saved, under fire, the life of a drowning soldier.
—	Horace Capron, Jr.*	Army	Sergeant	14th Regiment Illinois Volunteer Cavalry	Chickahominy and Ashland, Virginia	Jun 1862	Gallantry in action.
—	Hugh Carey	Army	Sergeant	(New York (state)) 82nd Regiment New York Volunteer Infantry	Battle of Gettysburg, Pa.	Jul 2, 1863	Captured the flag of the 7th Virginia Infantry (C.S.A.), being twice wounded in the effort.
	James L. Carey	Army	Sergeant	(New York (state)) 10th Regiment New York Volunteer Cavalry	Battle of Appomattox Courthouse, Virginia	Apr 9, 1865	Daring bravery and urging the men forward in a charge.
—	Casper R. Carlisle	Army	Private	Independent Battery F, Pennsylvania Volunteer Light Artillery	Battle of Gettysburg, Pa.	Jul 2, 1863	Saved a gun of his battery under heavy musketry fire, most of the horses being killed and the drivers wounded.
—	Warren Carman	Army	Private	(New York (state)) 1st Regiment New York Volunteer Cavalry	Battle of Waynesboro, Virginia	Mar 2, 1865	Capture of flag and several prisoners.
isaac h. carmin moh winner	Isaac H. Carmin	Army	Corporal	48th Regiment Ohio Volunteer Infantry	Battle of Vicksburg, Miss.	May 22, 1863	Saved his regimental flag; also seized and threw a shell, with burning fuse, from among his comrades.
A black man with beard seated, wearing a tweed suit with the Medal of Honor pinned to it.	William H. Carney	Army	Sergeant	54th Regiment Massachusetts Volunteer Infantry	Battle of Fort Wagner, Morris Island, S.C.	Jul 18, 1863	For carrying the regimental colors, portrayed in the film Glory.
A white man with a full, bushy beard, wearing a long unbuttoned military jacket over a vest, and a bow tie.	Eugene A. Carr	Army	Colonel	3rd Regiment Illinois Volunteer Cavalry	Battle of Pea Ridge, Ark.	Mar 7, 1862	Directed the deployment of his command and held his ground, under a brisk fire of shot and shell in which he was several times wounded.
moh winner franklin carr	Franklin Carr	Army	Corporal	124th Regiment Ohio Volunteer Infantry	Battle of Nashville, Tenn.	Dec 16, 1864	Recapture of U.S. guidon from a rebel battery.
—	William M. Carr	Navy	Master-at-Arms	(United States Navy) USS Richmond	Aboard USS Richmond, Battle of Mobile Bay	August 5, 1864	On board the U.S.S. Richmond during action against rebel forts and gunboats and with the ram Tennessee in Mobile Bay, 5 August 1864.
A white man with a full, light beard and dark suit, looking to the left.	William J. Carson	Army	Musician	(United States) 15th Regiment, U.S. Infantry	Battle of Chickamauga, Ga.	Sep 19, 1863	At a critical stage in the battle when the 14th Corps lines were wavering and in disorder he on his own initiative bugled "to the colors" amid the 15th U.S. Infantry who formed by him, and held the enemy. Within a few minutes he repeated his action amid the wavering 2nd Ohio Regiment Volunteer Infantry. This bugling deceived the enemy who believed reinforcements had arrived. Thus, they delayed their attack.
—	Jacob Cart	Army	Private	7th Pennsylvania Reserve Regiment	Battle of Fredericksburg, Virginia	Dec 13, 1862	Capture of flag of 19th Georgia Infantry (C.S.A.), wresting it from the hands of the color bearer.
—	John J. Carter	Army	Second Lieutenant	(New York (state)) 33rd Regiment New York Volunteer Infantry	Battle of Antietam, Md.	Sep 17, 1862	While in command of a detached company, seeing his regiment thrown into confusion by a charge of the enemy, without orders made a countercharge upon the attacking column and checked the assault. Penetrated within the enemy's lines at night and obtained valuable information.
—	Joseph F. Carter	Army	Captain	3rd Regiment Maryland Volunteer Infantry	Battle of Fort Stedman, Virginia	Mar 25, 1865	Captured the colors of the 51st Virginia Infantry (C.S.A.). During the battle he was captured and escaped bringing a number of prisoners with him.
—	Orlando E. Caruana	Army	Private	(New York (state)) 51st Regiment New York Volunteer Infantry	Battle of New Bern, North Carolina and Battle of South Mountain, Md.	Mar 14, 1862 and Sep 14, 1862	At New Bern, North Carolina, brought off the wounded color sergeant and the colors under a heavy fire of the enemy. Was one of four soldiers who volunteered to determine the position of the enemy at South Mountain, Md. While so engaged was fired upon and his three companions killed, but he escaped and rejoined his command in safety.
—	David P. Casey	Army	Private	25th Regiment Massachusetts Volunteer Infantry	Battle of Cold Harbor, Virginia	Jun 3, 1864	Two color bearers having been shot dead one after the other, the last one far in advance of his regiment and close to the enemy's line, this soldier rushed forward, and, under a galling fire, after removing the dead body of the bearer therefrom, secured the flag and returned with it to the Union lines.
—	Henry Casey	Army	Private	20th Regiment Ohio Volunteer Infantry	Vicksburg, Miss.	Apr 22, 1863	Voluntarily served as one of the crew of a transport that passed the forts under a heavy fire.
—	Michael Cassidy	Navy	Landsman	(United States Navy) USS Lackawanna	Aboard USS Lackawanna, Battle of Mobile Bay	August 5, 1864	Served on board the U.S.S. Lackawanna during successful attacks against Fort Morgan, rebel gunboats and the ram Tennessee, in Mobile Bay, 5 August 1864.
Head and torso portrait of a white man with a full beard, wearing a military jacket.	Isaac S. Catlin	Army	Colonel	(New York (state)) 109th New York Volunteer Infantry Regiment	Battle of the Crater, Petersburg, Virginia	Jul 30, 1864	In a heroic effort to rally the disorganized troops was disabled by a severe wound. While being carried from the field he recovered somewhat and bravely started to return to his command, when he received a second wound, which necessitated amputation of his right leg.
	Ovila Cayer	Army	Sergeant	(United States) 14th Regiment U.S. Infantry	Battle of Globe Tavern, Virginia	Aug 19, 1864	Commanded the regiment, all the officers being disabled.
Profile of a white man with a drooping mustache wearing a double-breasted military jacket with a rectangular patch and star on each shoulder.	Joshua L. Chamberlain	Army	Colonel	20th Regiment Maine Volunteer Infantry	Battle of Gettysburg, Pa.	Jul 2, 1863	For action at Little Round Top, portrayed in the film Gettysburg.
	Orville T. Chamberlain	Army	Second Lieutenant	74th Regiment Indiana Volunteer Infantry	Battle of Chickamauga, Ga.	Sep 20, 1863	While exposed to a galling fire, went in search of another regiment, found its location, procured ammunition from the men thereof, and returned with the ammunition to his own company.
—	Joseph B. Chambers	Army	Private	100th Regiment Pennsylvania Volunteer Infantry	Petersburg, Virginia	Mar 25, 1865	Capture of colors of 1st Virginia Infantry (C.S.A.).
—	Henry F. Chandler	Army	Sergeant	59th Regiment Massachusetts Volunteer Infantry	Second Battle of Petersburg, Virginia	Jun 17, 1864	Though seriously wounded in a bayonet charge and directed to go to the rear he declined to do so, but remained with his regiment and helped to carry the breastworks.
—	James B. Chandler	Navy	Coxswain	(United States Navy) USS Richmond	Aboard USS Richmond, Battle of Mobile Bay	August 5, 1864	On board the U.S.S. Richmond during action against rebel forts and gunboats and with the ram Tennessee in Mobile Bay, 5 August 1864.
—	Stephen E. Chandler	Army	Quartermaster Sergeant	(New York (state)) 24th New York Volunteer Cavalry	Amelia Springs, Virginia	Apr 5, 1865	Under severe fire of the enemy and of the troops in retreat, went between the lines to the assistance of a wounded and helpless comrade, and rescued him from death or capture.
	Alaric B. Chapin	Army	Private	(New York (state)) 142nd Regiment New York Volunteer Infantry	Second Battle of Fort Fisher, North Carolina	Jan 15, 1865	Voluntarily advanced with the head of the column and cut down the palisading.
—	John Chapman	Army	Private	1st Regiment Maine Volunteer Heavy Artillery	Battle of Sayler's Creek, Virginia	Apr 6, 1865	Captured the enemies flag at a battle in Sailors Creek Va
—	Louis G. Chaput	Navy	Landsman	(United States Navy) USS Lackawanna	Aboard USS Lackawanna, Battle of Mobile Bay	August 5, 1864	For actions aboard the U.S.S. Lackawana during the American Civil War
Head and torso of a white man with bushy beard wearing a wide-brimmed hat and a dark jacket. The right sleeve of the jacket is hanging empty.	John F. Chase	Army	Private	5th Battery, Maine Volunteer Light Artillery	Battle of Chancellorsville, Virginia	May 3, 1863	Nearly all the officers and men of the battery having been killed or wounded, this soldier with a comrade continued to fire his gun after the guns had ceased. The piece was then dragged off by the two, the horses having been shot, and its capture by the enemy was prevented.
—	Benjamin H. Child	Army	Corporal	Battery A, 1st Regiment Rhode Island Volunteer Light Artillery	Battle of Antietam, Md.	Sep 17, 1862	Was wounded and taken to the rear insensible, but when partially recovered insisted on returning to the battery and resumed command of his piece, so remaining until the close of the battle.
—	William W. Chisman	Army	Private	83rd Regiment Indiana Volunteer Infantry	Battle of Vicksburg, Miss.	May 22, 1863	Gallantry in the charge of the "volunteer storming party."
—	James I. Christiancy	Army	First Lieutenant	9th Regiment Michigan Volunteer Cavalry - Company D	Hawes Shops, Virginia	May 28, 1864	While acting as aide, voluntarily led a part of the line into the fight, and was twice wounded.
—	Samuel J. Churchill	Army	Corporal	Battery G, 2nd Regiment Illinois Volunteer Light Artillery	Battle of Nashville, Tenn.	Dec 15, 1864	When the fire of the enemy's batteries compelled the men of his detachment for a short time to seek shelter, he stood manfully at his post and for some minutes worked his gun alone.
—	Clinton A. Cilley	Army	Captain	2nd Regiment Minnesota Volunteer Infantry	Battle of Chickamauga, Ga.	Sep 20, 1863	Seized the colors of a retreating regiment and led it into the thick of the attack.
—	James T. Clancy	Army	Sergeant	1st Regiment, New Jersey Volunteer Cavalry	Battle of Vaughan Road, Virginia	Oct 1, 1864	Shot the Confederate Gen. Dunovant dead during a charge, thus confusing the enemy and greatly aiding in his repulse.
—	Albert A. Clapp	Army	First Sergeant	2nd Regiment, Ohio Volunteer Cavalry	Battle of Sayler's Creek, Virginia	Apr 6, 1865	Capture of battle flag of the 8th Florida Infantry (C.S.A.).
	Charles A. Clark	Army	Lieutenant and Adjutant	6th Regiment Maine Volunteer Infantry	Brooks Ford, Virginia	May 4, 1863	Having voluntarily taken command of his regiment in the absence of its commander, at great personal risk and with remarkable presence of mind and fertility of resource led the command down an exceedingly precipitous embankment to the Rappahannock River and by his gallantry, coolness, and good judgment in the face of the enemy saved the command from capture or destruction.
	Harrison Clark	Army	Corporal	(New York (state)) 125th Regiment New York Volunteer Infantry	Battle of Gettysburg, Pa.	Jul 2, 1863	Seized the colors and advanced with them after the color bearer had been shot
—	James G. Clark	Army	Private	88th Regiment, Pennsylvania Volunteer Infantry	Second Battle of Petersburg, Virginia	Jun 18, 1864	Distinguished bravery in action; was severely wounded
—	John W. Clark	Army	First Lieutenant and Regimental Quartermaster	6th Regiment Vermont Volunteer Infantry	near Warrenton, Virginia	Jul 28, 1863	Defended the division train against a vastly superior force of the enemy; he was severely wounded, but remained in the saddle for 20 hours afterward until he had brought his train through in safety
—	William A. Clark	Army	Corporal	2nd Regiment Minnesota Volunteer Infantry	Nolensville, Tenn.	Feb 15, 1863	Was one of a detachment of 16 men who heroically defended a wagon train against the attack of 125 cavalry, repulsed the attack and saved the train
—	Dayton P. Clarke	Army	Captain	2nd Regiment Vermont Volunteer Infantry	Battle of Spotsylvania Court House, Virginia	May 12, 1864	Distinguished conduct in a desperate hand-to-hand fight while commanding the regiment
—	Charles H. Clausen	Army	First Lieutenant	61st Regiment, Pennsylvania Volunteer Infantry	Battle of Spotsylvania Court House, Virginia	May 12, 1864	Although severely wounded, he led the regiment against the enemy, under a terrific fire, and saved a battery from capture
	Cecil Clay	Army	Captain	58th Regiment, Pennsylvania Volunteer Infantry	Fort Harrison, Battle of Chaffin's Farm, Virginia	Sep 29, 1864	Led his regiment in the charge, carrying the colors of another regiment, and when severely wounded in the right arm, incurring loss of same, he shifted the colors to the left hand, which also became disabled by a gunshot wound
—	Charles F. Cleveland	Army	Private	(New York (state)) 26th Regiment, New York Volunteer Infantry	Battle of Antietam, Md.	Sep 17, 1862	Voluntarily took and carried the colors into action after the color bearer had been shot.
—	Robert T. Clifford	Navy	Master-at-Arms	(United States Navy) USS Shokokon	Aboard USS Shokokon	August 22, 1863	Served on board the U.S.S. Shokokon at New Topsail Inlet off Wilmington, North Carolina, 22 August 1863.
—	John E. Clopp	Army	Private	71st Regiment, Pennsylvania Volunteer Infantry	Battle of Gettysburg, Pa.	Jul 3, 1863	Capture of flag of 9th Virginia Infantry (C.S.A.), wresting it from the color bearer
—	George W. Clute	Army	Corporal	14th Michigan Volunteer Infantry Regiment	Battle of Bentonville, North Carolina	Mar 19, 1865	In a charge, captured the flag of the 40th North Carolina (C.S.A.), the flag being taken in a personal encounter with an officer who carried and defended it.
	Jefferson Coates	Army	Sergeant	7th Regiment, Wisconsin Volunteer Infantry	Battle of Gettysburg, Pa.	Jul 1, 1863	Unsurpassed courage in battle, where he had both eyes shot out.
MoH winner David L. Cockley	David L. Cockley	Army	First Lieutenant	10th Regiment, Ohio Volunteer Cavalry	Battle of Waynesboro, Georgia	Dec 4, 1864	While acting as aide-de-camp to a general officer, he 3 times asked permission to join his regiment in a proposed charge upon the enemy, and in response to the last request, having obtained such permission, joined his regiment and fought bravely at its head throughout the action.
	James Coey	Army	Major	(New York (state)) 147th Regiment, New York Volunteer Infantry	Battle of Hatcher's Run, Virginia	Feb 6, 1865	Seized the regimental colors at a critical moment and by a prompt advance on the enemy caused the entire brigade to follow him; and, after being himself severely wounded, he caused himself to be lifted into the saddle and a second time rallied the line in an attempt to check the enemy.
—	Robert J. Coffey	Army	Sergeant	4th Regiment, Vermont Volunteer Infantry	Battle of Salem Church, Virginia	May 4, 1863	Single-handedly captured 2 officers and 5 privates of the 8th Louisiana Regiment (C.S.A.).
—	Abraham Cohn	Army	Sergeant Major	6th Regiment, New Hampshire Volunteer Infantry	Battle of the Wilderness, Virginia and Battle of the Crater, Petersburg, Virginia	May 6, 1864 and Jul 30, 1864	During Battle of the Wilderness rallied and formed, under heavy fire, disorganized and fleeing troops of different regiments. At Petersburg, Virginia, 30 July 1864, bravely and coolly carried orders to the advanced line under severe fire.
—	Patrick Colbert	Navy	Coxswain	(United States Navy) USS Commodore Hull	Aboard USS Commodore Hull	October 31, 1864	Served on board the U.S.S. Commodore Hull at the capture of Plymouth, 31 October 1864
—	Carlos W. Colby	Army	First Sergeant	Company G, 97th Regiment Illinois Volunteer Infantry	Battle of Vicksburg, Miss.	May 22, 1863	Gallantry in the charge of the "volunteer storming party."
—	Gabriel Cole	Army	Corporal	5th Regiment, Michigan Volunteer Cavalry	Battle of Opequon, Virginia	Sep 19, 1864	Capture of flag, during which he was wounded in the leg
—	Harrison Collins	Army	Corporal	1st Regiment, Tennessee Volunteer Cavalry	Richland Creek, Tenn.	Dec 24, 1864	Capture of flag of Chalmer's Division (C.S.A.).
—	Thomas D. Collins	Army	Sergeant	(New York (state)) 143rd Regiment, New York Volunteer Infantry	Battle of Resaca, Ga.	May 15, 1864	Captured a regimental flag of the enemy.
	Charles H. T. Collis	Army	Colonel	114th Regiment, Pennsylvania Volunteer Infantry	Battle of Fredericksburg, Virginia	Dec 13, 1862	Gallantly led his regiment in battle at a critical moment.
—	Oliver Colwell	Army	First Lieutenant	95th Regiment, Ohio Volunteer Infantry	Battle of Nashville, Tenn.	Dec 16, 1864	Capture of enemy flag.
	Hartwell B. Compson	Army	Major	(New York (state)) 8th Regiment, New York Volunteer Cavalry	Battle of Waynesboro, Virginia	Mar 2, 1865	Capture of flag belonging to Gen. Early's headquarters.
	John W. Conaway	Army	Private	83rd Regiment Indiana Volunteer Infantry	Battle of Vicksburg, Miss.	May 22, 1863	Gallantry in the charge of the "volunteer storming party."
—	Martin Conboy	Army	Sergeant	(New York (state)) 37th Regiment, New York Volunteer Infantry	Battle of Williamsburg, Virginia	May 5, 1862	Took command of the company in action, the captain having been wounded, the other commissioned officers being absent, and handled it with skill and bravery.
—	Dennis Conlan	Navy	Seaman	(United States Navy) USS Agawam	Aboard USS Agawam, First Battle of Fort Fisher	December 23, 1864	Conlan served on board the U.S.S. Agawam, as one of a volunteer crew of a powder boat which was exploded near Fort Fisher, 23 December 1864.
—	Trustrim Connell	Army	Corporal	138th Regiment, Pennsylvania Volunteer Infantry	Sailors Creek, Virginia	April 6, 1865	Capture of enemy flag.
	Richard Conner	Army	Private	6th Regiment, New Jersey Volunteer Infantry	Bull Run, Virginia	Aug 30, 1862	The flag of his regiment having been abandoned during retreat, he voluntarily returned with a single companion under a heavy fire and secured and brought off the flag, his companion being killed.
—	Thomas Connor	Navy	Ordinary Seaman	(United States Navy) USS Minnesota	USS Minnesota Landing Party, Second Battle of Fort Fisher	January 15, 1865	On board the U.S.S. Minnesota, in action during the assault on Fort Fisher, 15 January 1865.
—	William C. Connor	Navy	Boatswain's Mate	(United States Navy) USS Howquah	Aboard USS Howquah	September 25, 1864	Served on board the U.S.S. Howquah on the occasion of the destruction of the blockade runner Lynx, off Wilmington, 25 September 1864. Performing his duty faithfully under the most trying circumstances, Connor stood firmly at his post in the midst of a crossfire from the rebel shore batteries and our own vessels.
—	James Connors	Army	Private	(New York (state)) 43rd Regiment, New York Volunteer Infantry	Fishers Hill, Virginia	Sep 22, 1864	Capture of enemy flag.
A white boy in soldier's uniform holding a bugle in his left hand and a staff in his right, standing before a painted scene of an army camp.	John Cook	Army	Bugler	(United States) Battery B, 4th Regiment U.S. Artillery	Antietam Md.	Sep 17, 1862	Volunteered at the age of 15 years to act as a cannoneer, and as such volunteer served a gun under a terrific fire of the enemy.
—	John H. Cook	Army	Sergeant	119th Regiment Illinois Volunteer Infantry	Pleasant Hill, Louisiana	Apr 9, 1864	During an attack by the enemy, voluntarily left the brigade quartermaster, with whom he had been detailed as a clerk, rejoined his command, and, acting as first lieutenant, led the line farther toward the charging enemy.
—	Walter H. Cooke	Army	Captain	4th Regiment, Pennsylvania Volunteer Infantry	Bull Run, Virginia	July 21, 1861	Voluntarily served as an aide on the staff of Col. David Hunter and participated in the battle, his term of service having expired on the previous day.
—	John L. M. Cooper	Navy	Coxswain	(United States Navy) USS Brooklyn	Aboard USS Brooklyn, Battle of Mobile Bay	Aug 5, 1864	1st award: Heroic conduct
—	John L. M. Cooper	Navy	Quartermaster	(United States Navy) USS Brooklyn (1858)	Mobile, Alabama	Apr 26, 1865	2nd award: Rescued a wounded comrade from a fire
—	Charles D. Copp	Army	Second Lieutenant	9th Regiment New Hampshire Volunteer Infantry	Battle of Fredericksburg, Virginia	Dec 13, 1862	Seized the regimental colors, the color bearer having been shot down, and, waving them, rallied the regiment under a heavy fire.
—	John Corcoran	Army	Private	Battery G, 1st Regiment Rhode Island Volunteer Light Artillery	Third Battle of Petersburg, Virginia	Apr 2, 1865	Was one of a detachment of 20 picked artillerymen who voluntarily accompanied an infantry assaulting party, and who turned upon the enemy the guns captured in the assault.
Head of a white man with a drooping mustache and short hair, wearing a dark suit over a light-colored shirt and tie. The portrait is surrounded by a shield-shaped decorative frame.	Thomas E. Corcoran	Navy	Landsman	(United States Navy) USS Cincinnati	Aboard USS Cincinnati, Operations against Vicksburg	May 27, 1863	Served on board the U.S.S. Cincinnati during the attack on the Vicksburg batteries and at the time of her sinking
—	George W. Corliss	Army	Captain	5th Regiment, Connecticut Volunteer Infantry	Cedar Mountain, Virginia	Aug 9, 1862	Seized a fallen flag of the regiment, the color bearer having been killed, carried it forward in the face of a severe fire, and though himself shot down and permanently disabled, planted the staff in the earth and kept the flag flying.
	Stephen P. Corliss	Army	First Lieutenant	(New York (state)) 4th Regiment, New York Volunteer Heavy Artillery	South Side Railroad, Virginia	Apr 2, 1865	Raised the fallen colors and, rushing forward in advance of the troops, placed them on the enemy's works.
—	Joseph K. Corson	Army	Assistant Surgeon	6th Pennsylvania Reserve Regiment	near Bristoe Station, Virginia	Oct 14, 1863	With one companion returned in the face of the enemy's heavy artillery fire and removed to a place of safety a severely wounded soldier who had been left behind as the regiment fell back.
Head of a white man with bushy beard and thick hair wearing a suit, vest, and bow tie. The portrait is surrounded by a decorative oval frame.	Richard H. Cosgriff	Army	Private	4th Iowa Volunteer Cavalry Regiment	Columbus, Ga.	Apr 16, 1865	Capture of flag in a personal encounter with its bearer.
—	Thomas Cosgrove	Army	Private	40th Massachusetts Volunteer Infantry Regiment	Drurys Bluff, Virginia	May 15, 1864	Individually demanded and received the surrender of 7 armed Confederates concealed in a cellar, disarming and marching them in as prisoners of war.
—	Peter Cotton	Navy	Ordinary Seaman	(United States Navy) USS Baron DeKalb	Aboard USS Baron DeKalb, Yazoo Pass Expedition	December 23, 1862 – December 27, 1862	Cotton served on board the U.S.S. Baron De Kalb in the Yazoo River expedition, 23 to 27 December 1862
	John Coughlin	Army	Lieutenant Colonel	10th New Hampshire Volunteer Infantry	Swifts Creek, Virginia	May 9, 1864	During a sudden night attack upon Burnham's Brigade, resulting in much confusion, this officer, without waiting for orders, led his regiment forward and interposed a line of battle between the advancing enemy and Hunt's Battery, repulsing the attack and saving the guns.
moh winner robert m. cox	Robert M. Cox	Army	Corporal	55th Illinois Volunteer Infantry Regiment	Battle of Vicksburg, Miss.	May 22, 1863	Bravely defended the colors planted on the outward parapet of Fort Hill.
—	John N. Coyne	Army	Sergeant	(New York (state)) 70th New York Volunteer Infantry Regiment	Battle of Williamsburg, Virginia	May 5, 1862	Capture of a flag after a severe hand-to-hand contest; was mentioned in orders for his gallantry.
	William W. Cranston	Army	Private	66th Ohio Volunteer Infantry Regiment	Battle of Chancellorsville, Virginia	May 2, 1863	One of a party of 4 who voluntarily brought in a wounded Confederate officer from within the enemy's line in the face of a constant fire.
—	Alexander Crawford	Navy	Fireman	(United States Navy) USS Wyalusing	Aboard USS Wyalusing in the Roanoke River	May 25, 1864	Volunteered for a mission to destroy the CSS Albemarle, evaded capture after mission failed.
—	John Creed	Army	Private	23rd Illinois Volunteer Infantry Regiment	Fishers Hill, Virginia	Sep 22, 1864	Capture of the enemy flag.
—	Thomas Cripps	Navy	Quartermaster	(United States Navy) USS Richmond	Aboard USS Richmond, Battle of Mobile Bay	August 5, 1864	As captain of a gun on board the U.S.S. Richmond during action against rebel forts and gunboats and with the ram Tennessee in Mobile Bay, 5 August 1864. Despite damage to his ship and the loss of several men on board as enemy fire raked her decks, Cripps fought his gun with skill and courage throughout a furious 2-hour battle which resulted in the surrender of the rebel ram Tennessee and in the damaging and destruction of batteries at Fort Morgan.
—	Henry H. Crocker	Army	Captain	2nd Massachusetts Volunteer Cavalry Regiment	Battle of Cedar Creek, Virginia	Oct 19, 1864	Voluntarily led a charge, which resulted in the capture of 14 prisoners and in which he himself was wounded.
—	Ulric L. Crocker	Army	Private	6th Michigan Volunteer Cavalry Regiment	Battle of Cedar Creek, Virginia	Oct 19, 1864	Capture of flag of 18th Georgia (C.S.A.).
—	James E. Croft	Army	Private	12th Independent Battery, Wisconsin Volunteer Light Artillery	Allatoona, Ga.	Oct 5, 1864	Took the place of a gunner who had been shot down and inspired his comrades by his bravery and effective gunnery, which contributed largely to the defeat of the enemy.
A white man with a mustache standing with his left arm resting on an object to his side and his right hand inside his jacket. A star-shaped medal is hanging from a ribbon on his left breast.	Cornelius Cronin	Navy	Chief Quartermaster	(United States Navy) USS Richmond	Aboard USS Richmond, Battle of Mobile Bay	August 5, 1864	On board the U.S.S. Richmond in action at Mobile Bay on 5 August 1864
—	William H. H. Crosier	Army	Sergeant	(New York (state)) 149th New York Volunteer Infantry	Battle of Peachtree Creek, Ga.	Jul 20, 1864	Severely wounded and ambushed by the enemy, he stripped the colors from the staff and brought them back into the line.
—	James E. Cross	Army	Corporal	(New York (state)) 12th New York Infantry	Blackburns Ford, Virginia	Jul 18, 1861	With a companion, refused to retreat when the part of the regiment to which he was attached was driven back in disorder, but remained upon the skirmish line for some time thereafter, firing upon the enemy.
—	Michael Crowley	Army	Private	(New York (state)) 2nd New York Volunteer Cavalry Regiment	Battle of Waynesboro, Virginia	Mar 2, 1865	Capture of the enemy flag.
—	Thomas Cullen	Army	Corporal	(New York (state)) 82nd New York Volunteer Infantry Regiment	Bristoe Station, Virginia	Oct 14, 1863	Capture of flag of 22d or 28th North Carolina (C.S.A.).
A white man with a full mustache in a dark suit with a bow tie and vest, looking right.	Amos J. Cummings	Army	Sergeant Major	26th New Jersey Volunteer Infantry Regiment	Salem Heights, Virginia	May 4, 1863	Rendered great assistance in the heat of the action in rescuing a part of the field batteries from an extremely dangerous and exposed position.
—	James M. Cumpston	Army	Private	91st Ohio Volunteer Infantry Regiment	Shenandoah Valley Campaigns of 1864	Aug 1864 – Nov 1864	Capture of the enemy flag
	Francis M. Cunningham	Army	First Sergeant	1st West Virginia Volunteer Cavalry Regiment	Battle of Sayler's Creek, Virginia	Apr 6, 1865	Capture of battle flag of 12th Virginia Infantry (C.S.A.) in hand-to-hand battle while wounded.
	James S. Cunningham	Army	Private	8th Missouri Volunteer Infantry	Battle of Vicksburg, Miss.	May 22, 1863	Gallantry in the charge of the "volunteer storming party."
	Richard J. Curran	Army	Assistant Surgeon	(New York (state)) 33rd New York Volunteer Infantry Regiment	Battle of Antietam, Md.	Sep 17, 1862	Voluntarily exposed himself to great danger by going to the fighting line there succoring the wounded and helpless and conducting them to the field hospital.
Head and shoulders of an older white man with Van Dyke mustache and goatee wearing a dark suit over a white shirt and dark tie. Below are the words "LIEUTENANT JOHN C. CURTIS".	John C. Curtis	Army	Sergeant Major	9th Regiment Connecticut Volunteer Infantry	Battle of Baton Rouge, Louisiana	Aug 5, 1862	Voluntarily sought the line of battle and alone and unaided captured 2 prisoners, driving them before him to regimental headquarters at the point of the bayonet.
—	Josiah M. Curtis	Army	Second Lieutenant	12th Regiment West Virginia Volunteer Infantry	Third Battle of Petersburg, Virginia	Apr 2, 1865	Seized the colors of his regiment after 2 color bearers had fallen, bore them gallantly, and was among the first to gain a foothold, with his flag, inside the enemy's works.
Profile of a white man with a long beard and thick hair wearing a double-breasted military jacket with a rectangular patch on the shoulder.	Newton M. Curtis	Army	Brigadier General	1st Brigade, 2nd Division, X Corps	Second Battle of Fort Fisher, North Carolina	Jan 15, 1865	The first man to pass through the stockade, he personally led each assault on the traverses and was 4 times wounded.
	Alonzo H. Cushing*	Army	First Lieutenant	(United States) 4th U.S. Light Artillery, Battery A	Pickett's Charge, Battle of Gettysburg, Pennsylvania	Jul 3, 1863	Refusing to evacuate to the rear despite his severe wounds, he directed the operation of his lone field piece continuing to fire in the face of the enemy.
Head and shoulders of a white man with mustache. He is wearing an ornate military jacket with shoulder boards, a scarf around the neck, and cords and tassels hanging from the left breast.	Thomas W. Custer	Army	Second Lieutenant	6th Michigan Volunteer Cavalry Regiment	Battle of Namozine Church, Virginia	Apr 3, 1865	1st award: Captured an enemy flag
Head and shoulders of a white man with mustache. He is wearing an ornate military jacket with shoulder boards, a scarf around the neck, and cords and tassels hanging from the left breast.	Thomas W. Custer	Army	Second Lieutenant	6th Michigan Volunteer Cavalry Regiment	Battle of Sayler's Creek, Virginia	Apr 6, 1865	2nd award: Captured two enemy flags
Head and shoulders of an older white man with full beard and wire-framed glasses, wearing a dark suit and bow tie.	Byron M. Cutcheon	Army	Major	27th Michigan Volunteer Infantry Regiment	Horseshoe Bend, Ky.	May 10, 1863	Distinguished gallantry in leading his regiment in a charge on a house occupied by the enemy.
	James M. Cutts	Army	Captain	(United States) 1st Battalion, 11th U.S. Infantry Regiment	Battle of the Wilderness; Spotsylvania; Petersburg, Virginia	1864	Gallantry in actions.

== D ==
Image	Name	Service	Rank	Unit/Command	Place of action	Date of action	Notes
Head of a white man with a large mustache and receding hairline wearing a dark suit, white shirt, and dark tie. Over the bottom right of the portrait is a decorative design.	John S. Darrough	Army	Sergeant	113th Illinois Volunteer Infantry Regiment	Eastport, Miss.	Oct 10, 1864	Saved the life of a Captain
—	John A. Davidsizer	Army	Sergeant	(Illinois) 1st Pennsylvania Cavalry	Paines Crossroads, Virginia	Apr 5, 1865	Capture of flag
moh winner andrew davidson 1895	Andrew Davidson	Army	Assistant Surgeon	47th Ohio Volunteer Infantry Regiment	Vicksburg, Miss.	May 3, 1863	Voluntarily attempted to run the enemy's batteries.
—	Andrew Davidson	Army	First Lieutenant	30th United States Colored Infantry Regiment	Battle of the Crater, Petersburg, Virginia	Jul 30, 1864	One of the first to enter the enemy's works, where, after his colonel, major, and one-third the company officers had fallen, he gallantly assisted in rallying and saving the remnant of the command.
—	Charles C. Davis	Army	Major	7th Pennsylvania Cavalry	Shelbyville, Tenn.	Jun 27, 1863	Led one of the most desperate and successful charges of the war.
—	Freeman Davis	Army	Sergeant	80th Ohio Volunteer Infantry Regiment	Battle of Missionary Ridge, Tenn.	Nov 25, 1863	This soldier, while his regiment was falling back, seeing the 2 color bearers shot down, under a severe fire and at imminent peril recovered both the flags and saved them from capture.
Head and shoulders of a young white man wearing a military jacket with rectangular patches atop each shoulder.	George E. Davis	Army	First Lieutenant	10th Vermont Volunteer Infantry Regiment	Battle of Monocacy Junction, Md.	Jul 9, 1864	While in command of a small force, held the approaches to the 2 bridges against repeated assaults of superior numbers, thereby materially delaying Early's advance on Washington.
—	Harry Davis	Army	Private	46th Ohio Volunteer Infantry	Battle of Ezra Church, Atlanta, Ga.	Jul 28, 1864	Served in 46th O.V.I. Capture of flag of 30th Louisiana Infantry (C.S.A.).
—	John Davis	Navy	Quarter Gunner	(United States Navy) USS Valley City	Aboard USS Valley City	February 10, 1862	Served on board the U.S.S. Valley City during action against rebel fort batteries and ships off Elizabeth City, North Carolina, on 10 February 1862
—	John Davis	Army	Private	17th Indiana Volunteer Mounted Infantry	Culloden, Ga.	Apr 1865	Capture of flag of Worrill Grays (C.S.A.).
moh winner joseph davis	Joseph Davis	Army	Corporal	104th Ohio Volunteer Infantry Regiment	Second Battle of Franklin, Tenn.	Nov 30, 1864	Capture of flag.
—	Martin K. Davis	Army	Sergeant	116th Illinois Volunteer Infantry Regiment	Battle of Vicksburg, Miss.	May 22, 1863	Gallantry in the charge of the "volunteer storming party."
—	Samuel W. Davis	Navy	Ordinary Seaman	(United States Navy) USS Brooklyn	Aboard USS Brooklyn, Battle of Mobile Bay	August 5, 1864	On board the U.S.S. Brooklyn during successful attacks against Fort Morgan, rebel gunboats and the ram Tennessee in Mobile Bay, on 5 August 1864
—	Thomas Davis	Army	Private	(New York (state)) 2nd New York Volunteer Heavy Artillery Regiment	Battle of Sayler's Creek, Virginia	Apr 6, 1865	Capture of flag.
—	Charles Day	Army	Private	210th Pennsylvania Volunteer Infantry Regiment	Battle of Hatcher's Run, Virginia	Feb 6, 1865	Seized the colors of another regiment of the brigade, the regiment having been thrown into confusion and the color bearer killed, and bore said colors throughout the remainder of the engagement.
	David F. Day	Army	Private	57th Ohio Volunteer Infantry Regiment	Battle of Vicksburg, Miss.	May 22, 1863	Gallantry in the charge of the "volunteer storming party."
—	Charles Deakin	Navy	Boatswain's Mate	(United States Navy) USS Richmond	Aboard USS Richmond, Battle of Mobile Bay	August 5, 1864	As captain of a gun on board the U.S.S. Richmond during action against rebel forts and gunboats and with the ram Tennessee in Mobile Bay, 5 August 1864. Despite damage to his ship and the loss of several men on board as enemy fire raked her decks, Deakin fought his gun with skill and courage throughout a furious 2-hour battle which resulted in the surrender of the rebel ram Tennessee and in the damaging and destruction of batteries at Fort Morgan. He also participated in the actions at Forts Jackson and St. Philip.
Head and shoulders of a white man with mustache wearing a double-breasted suit coat over a shirt and tie. Two medals are pinned to the coat's left breast.	John M. Deane	Army	Major	29th Massachusetts Volunteer Infantry Regiment	Battle of Fort Stedman, Virginia	Mar 25, 1865	This officer, observing an abandoned gun within Fort Haskell, called for volunteers, and under a heavy fire, worked the gun until the enemy's advancing line was routed.
—	Joseph H. De Castro	Army	Corporal	19th Massachusetts Volunteer Infantry Regiment	Battle of Gettysburg, Pa.	Jul 3, 1863	Capture of flag of 19th Virginia Infantry regiment (C.S.A.).
	Patrick De Lacey	Army	First Sergeant	143rd Pennsylvania Volunteer Infantry Regiment	Battle of the Wilderness, Virginia	May 6, 1864	Running ahead of the line, under a concentrated fire, he shot the color bearer of a Confederate regiment on the works, thus contributing to the success of the attack.
—	Frederick N. Deland	Army	Private	49th Massachusetts Volunteer Infantry Regiment	Siege of Port Hudson, Louisiana	May 27, 1863	Volunteered in response to a call and, under a heavy fire from the enemy, advanced and assisted in filling with fascines a ditch which presented a serious obstacle to the troops attempting to take the works of the enemy by assault.
—	John C. Delaney	Army	Sergeant	107th Pennsylvania Volunteer Infantry Regiment	Battle of Hatcher's Run, Virginia	Feb 6, 1865	Sprang between the lines and brought out a wounded comrade about to be burned in the brush.
—	Hiram H. De Lavie	Army	Sergeant	11th Pennsylvania Volunteer Infantry Regiment	Battle of Five Forks, Virginia	Apr 1, 1865	Capture of flag.
—	John Dempster	Navy	Coxswain	(United States Navy) USS New Ironsides	Aboard USS New Ironsides, First and Second Battles of Fort Fisher	Dec 1864 – Jan 1865	Dempster served on board the U.S.S. New Ironsides during action in several attacks on Fort Fisher, 24 and 25 December 1864; and 13, 14, and 15 January 1865
—	J. Henry Denig	Marine Corps	Sergeant	(United States Marine Corps) USS Brooklyn	Aboard USS Brooklyn, Battle of Mobile Bay	August 5, 1864	On board the U.S.S. Brooklyn during action against rebel forts and gunboats and with the ram Tennessee, in Mobile Bay, 5 August 1864.
—	Lorenzo Denning	Navy	Landsman	U.S. Picket Boat No. 1	Aboard U.S. Picket Boat No. 1	October 27, 1864	Denning served on board the U.S. Picket Boat No. 1 in action, 27 October 1864, against the Confederate ram Albemarle which had resisted repeated attacks by our steamers and had kept a large force of vessels employed in watching her. The picket boat, equipped with a spar torpedo, succeeded in passing the enemy pickets within 20 yards without being discovered and then made for the Albemarle under a full head of steam. Immediately taken under fire by the ram, the small boat plunged on, jumped the log boom which encircled the target and exploded its torpedo under the port bow of the ram. The picket boat was destroyed by enemy fire and almost the entire crew taken prisoner or lost.
—	Richard Dennis	Navy	Boatswain's Mate	(United States Navy) USS Brooklyn	Aboard USS Brooklyn, Battle of Mobile Bay	August 5, 1864	On board the U.S.S. Brooklyn during successful attacks against Fort Morgan, rebel gunboats and the ram Tennessee in Mobile Bay, on 5 August 1864.
—	William Densmore	Navy	Chief Boatswain's Mate	(United States Navy) USS Richmond	Aboard USS Richmond, Battle of Mobile Bay	August 5, 1864	As captain of a gun on board the U.S.S. Richmond during action against rebel forts and gunboats and with the ram Tennessee in Mobile Bay, 5 August 1864. Despite damage to his ship and the loss of several men on board as enemy fire raked her decks, Densmore fought his gun with skill and courage throughout a furious 2-hour battle which resulted in the surrender of the rebel ram Tennessee and in the damaging and destruction of batteries at Fort Morgan.
—	Charles H. De Puy	Army	First Sergeant	1st Michigan Volunteer Sharpshooters Regiment -	Battle of the Crater, Petersburg, Virginia	Jul 30, 1864	Being an old artillerist, aided General Bartlett in working the guns of the dismantled fort.
	Richard W. DeWitt	Army	Corporal	47th Ohio Volunteer Infantry Regiment	Battle of Vicksburg, Miss.	May 22, 1863	Gallantry in the charge of a "volunteer storming party."
Head and shoulders of an older white man with a large drooping mustache wearing pince-nez glasses and a suit and tie. The portrait is surrounded by an oval frame and a depiction of an American flag.	Luigi P. di Cesnola	Army	Colonel	(New York (state)) 4th New York Volunteer Cavalry Regiment	Battle of Aldie, Virginia	Jun 17, 1863	Was present, in arrest, when, seeing his regiment fall back, he rallied his men, accompanied them, without arms, in a second charge, and in recognition of his gallantry was released from arrest. He continued in the action at the head of his regiment until he was desperately wounded and taken prisoner.
	William D. Dickey	Army	Captain	(New York (state)) 15th New York Heavy Artillery Regiment	Second Battle of Petersburg, Virginia	Jun 17, 1864	Refused to leave the field, remaining in command after being wounded by a piece of shell, and led his command in the assault on the enemy's works on the following day.
—	David Dickie	Army	Sergeant	Company A – 97th Illinois Volunteer Infantry Regiment	Battle of Vicksburg, Miss.	May 22, 1863	Gallantry in the charge of the "volunteer storming party."
Head of a white man with mustache and short hair wearing a dark jacket. Around the portrait is a shield-shaped frame and a depiction of an American flag.	Bartholomew Diggins	Navy	Ordinary Seaman	(United States Navy) USS Hartford	Aboard USS Hartford, Battle of Mobile Bay	August 5, 1864	On board the flagship, U.S.S. Hartford, during action against rebel forts and gunboats and with the ram Tennessee in Mobile Bay, 5 August 1864.
	Hubert Dilger	Army	Captain	Battery I, 1st Ohio Volunteer Light Artillery	Battle of Chancellorsville, Virginia	May 2, 1863	Fought his guns until the enemy were upon him, then with one gun hauled in the road by hand he formed the rear guard and kept the enemy at bay by the rapidity of his fire and was the last man in the retreat.
	Michael A. Dillon	Army	Private	2nd New Hampshire Volunteer Infantry Regiment	Battle of Williamsburg, Virginia and Battle of Oak Grove, Virginia	May 5, 1862 and Jun 25, 1862	Bravery in repulsing the enemy's charge on a battery, at Williamsburg, Virginia At Oak Grove, Virginia, crawled outside the lines and brought in important information.
—	John Ditzenback	Navy	Quartermaster	(United States Navy) USS Neosho	Aboard USS Neosho	December 6, 1864	Served on board the U.S. Monitor Neosho during the engagement with enemy batteries at Bells Mills, Cumberland River, near Nashville, Tenn., 6 December 1864
—	Warren C. Dockum	Army	Private	(New York (state)) 121st New York Volunteer Infantry Regiment	Battle of Sayler's Creek, Virginia	Apr 6, 1865	Capture of flag of Savannah Guards (C.S.A.), after 2 other men had been killed in the effort.
—	Robert F. Dodd	Army	Private	27th Michigan Volunteer Infantry Regiment	Battle of the Crater, Petersburg, Virginia	Jul 30, 1864	While acting as orderly, voluntarily assisted to carry off the wounded from the ground in front of the crater while exposed to a heavy fire.
—	Edward E. Dodds	Army	Sergeant	(New York (state)) 21st New York Volunteer Cavalry	Ashby Gap, Virginia	Jul 19, 1864	At great personal risk rescued his wounded captain and carried him from the field to a place of safety.
—	Charles W. Dolloff	Army	Corporal	1st Vermont Volunteer Infantry Regiment	Third Battle of Petersburg, Virginia	Apr 2, 1865	Capture of flag.
—	John P. Donaldson	Army	Sergeant	4th Pennsylvania Cavalry	Battle of Appomattox Courthouse, Virginia	Apr 9, 1865	Capture of flag of 4th Virginia Cavalry (C.S.A.).
—	John Donnelly	Navy	Ordinary Seaman	(United States Navy) USS Metacomet	Aboard USS Metacomet, Battle of Mobile Bay	August 5, 1864	Served on board the U.S.S. Metacomet. As a member of the boat's crew which went to the rescue of the U.S. Monitor Tecumseh when that vessel was struck by a torpedo in passing the enemy forts in Mobile Bay, 5 August 1864, Donnelly braved the enemy fire which was said by the admiral to be "one of the most galling" he had ever seen and aided in rescuing from death 10 of the crew of the Tecumseh, eliciting the admiration of both friend and foe.
—	Timothy Donoghue	Army	Private	(New York (state)) 69th New York Infantry	Battle of Fredericksburg, Virginia	Dec 13, 1862	Voluntarily carried a wounded officer off the field from between the lines; while doing this he was himself wounded.
—	Patrick H. Doody	Army	Corporal	(New York (state)) 164th New York Volunteer Infantry	Battle of Cold Harbor, Virginia	Jun 7, 1864	After making a successful personal reconnaissance, he gallantly led the skirmishers in a night attack, charging the enemy, and thus enabling the pioneers to put up works.
—	William Doolen	Navy	Coal Heaver	(United States Navy) USS Richmond	Aboard USS Richmond, Battle of Mobile Bay	August 5, 1864	On board the U.S.S. Richmond during action against rebel forts and gunboats and with the ram Tennessee in Mobile Bay, 5 August 1864
—	George H. Doré	Army	Sergeant	(New York (state)) 126th New York Volunteer Infantry	Battle of Gettysburg, Pa.	Jul 3, 1863	The colors being struck down by a shell as the enemy were charging, this soldier rushed out and seized it, exposing himself to the fire of both sides.
—	August Dorley	Army	Private	1st Louisiana Cavalry Regiment	Mount Pleasant, Ala.	Apr 11, 1865	Capture of flag. ←See discussion page regarding spelling of name -->
moh winner john henry dorman	John Henry Dorman	Navy	Seaman	(United States Navy) USS Carondelet	Aboard USS Carondelet, Battle of Fort Henry and Siege of Vicksburg	February 6, 1862 and May 22, 1863	Carrying out his duties courageously throughout the actions of the Carondelet, Dorman, although wounded several times invariably returned to duty and constantly presented an example of devotion to the flag.
Head and shoulders of a white man with a graying beard, wearing a dark cowboy hat, suit coat, and bowtie.	Daniel A. Dorsey	Army	Corporal	33rd Ohio Volunteer Infantry Regiment	Great Locomotive Chase, Ga.	Apr 1862	One of the 19 of 22 men (including 2 civilians) who, by direction of Gen. Mitchell (or Buell), penetrated nearly 200 miles south into enemy territory and captured a railroad train at Big Shanty, Ga., in an attempt to destroy the bridges and track between Chattanooga and Atlanta.
—	Decatur Dorsey	Army	Sergeant	39th United States Colored Infantry Regiment	Battle of the Crater, Petersburg, Virginia	Jul 30, 1864	For carrying the regimental colors while under fire.
	Allan H. Dougall	Army	First Lieutenant and Adjutant	88th Indiana Volunteer Infantry Regiment	Battle of Bentonville, North Carolina	Mar 19, 1865	In the face of a galling fire from the enemy he voluntarily returned to where the color bearer had fallen wounded and saved the flag of his regiment from capture.
—	Michael Dougherty	Army	Private	13th Pennsylvania Volunteer Cavalry Regiment	Jefferson, Virginia	Oct 12, 1863	At the head of a detachment of his company dashed across an open field, exposed to a deadly fire from the enemy, and succeeded in dislodging them from an unoccupied house, which he and his comrades defended for several hours against repeated attacks, thus preventing the enemy from flanking the position of the Union forces.
—	Patrick Dougherty	Navy	Landsman	(United States Navy) USS Lackawanna	Aboard USS Lackawanna, Battle of Mobile Bay	August 5, 1864	As a landsman on board the U.S.S. Lackawanna, Dougherty acted gallantly without orders when the powder box at his gun was disabled under the heavy enemy fire, and maintained a supply of powder throughout the prolonged action. Dougherty also aided in the attacks on Fort Morgan and in the capture of the prize ram Tennessee.
—	George P. Dow	Army	Sergeant	7th New Hampshire Volunteer Infantry	near Richmond, Virginia	Oct 1864	Gallantry while in command of his company during a reconnaissance toward Richmond
—	Henry Dow	Navy	Boatswain's Mate	(United States Navy) USS Cincinnati	Aboard USS Cincinnati, Operations against Vicksburg	May 27, 1863	Served on board the U.S.S. Cincinnati during the attack on the Vicksburg batteries and at the time of her sinking, 27 May 1863.
—	William Downey	Army	Private	4th Massachusetts Volunteer Cavalry Regiment	Ashepoo River, S.C.	May 24, 1864	Volunteered as a member of a boatcrew which went to the rescue of a large number of Union soldiers on board the stranded steamer Boston, and with great gallantry assisted in conveying them to shore, being exposed during the entire time to a heavy fire from a Confederate battery.
—	Henry W. Downs	Army	Sergeant	8th Vermont Volunteer Infantry Regiment	Battle of Opequon, Virginia	Sep 19, 1864	With one comrade, voluntarily crossed an open field, exposed to a raking fire, and returned with a supply of ammunition, successfully repeating the attempt a short time thereafter.
	James M. Drake	Army	Second Lieutenant	9th New Jersey Volunteer Infantry	Battle of Port Walthall Junction, Virginia	May 6, 1864	Commanded the skirmish line in the advance and held his position all day and during the night.
—	James Drury	Army	Sergeant	4th Vermont Volunteer Infantry Regiment	Battle of Jerusalem Plank Road, Virginia	Jun 23, 1864	Saved the colors of his regiment when it was surrounded by a much larger force of the enemy and after the greater part of the regiment had been killed or captured.
—	John Duffey	Army	Private	Company B, 4th Massachusetts Volunteer Cavalry Regiment	Ashepoo River, S.C.	May 24, 1864	Volunteered as a member of a boatcrew which went to the rescue of a large number of Union soldiers on board the stranded steamer Boston, and with great gallantry assisted in conveying them to shore, being exposed during the entire time to a heavy fire from a Confederate battery.
—	Adam Duncan	Navy	Boatswain's Mate	(United States Navy) USS Richmond	Aboard USS Richmond, Battle of Mobile Bay	August 5, 1864	As captain of a gun on board the U.S.S. Richmond during action against rebel forts and gunboats and with the ram Tennessee in Mobile Bay, 5 August 1864. Despite damage to his ship and the loss of several men on board as enemy fire raked her decks, Duncan fought his gun with skill and courage throughout the prolonged battle which resulted in the surrender of the rebel ram Tennessee and in the successful attacks carried out on Fort Morgan.
—	James K. L. Duncan	Navy	Ordinary Seaman	(United States Navy) USS Fort Hindman	Aboard USS Fort Hindman	March 2, 1864	Served on board the U.S.S. Fort Hindman during the engagement near Harrisonburg, Louisiana, 2 March 1864
	James Dunlavy	Army	Private	3rd Iowa Volunteer Cavalry Regiment	Osage, Kans.	Oct 25, 1864	Gallantry in capturing Gen. Marmaduke
—	William Dunn	Navy	Quartermaster	(United States Navy) USS Monadnock	Aboard USS Monadnock, First and Second Battles of Fort Fisher	Dec 1864 – Jan 1865	On board the U.S.S. Monadnock in action during several attacks on Fort Fisher, 24 and 25 December 1864; and 13, 14, and 15 January 1865.
—	James Dunne	Army	Corporal	Chicago Mercantile Battery, Illinois Volunteer Light Artillery	Battle of Vicksburg, Miss.	May 22, 1863	Carried with others by hand a cannon up to and fired it through an embrasure of the enemy's works.
	Richard D. Dunphy	Navy	Coal Heaver	(United States Navy) USS Hartford	Aboard USS Hartford, Battle of Mobile Bay	August 5, 1864	On board the flagship U.S.S. Hartford during successful attacks against Fort Morgan, rebel gunboats and the rebel ram Tennessee, Mobile Bay, 5 August 1864. With his ship under terrific enemy shellfire, Dunphy performed his duties with skill and courage throughout this fierce engagement which resulted in the capture of the rebel ram Tennessee.
Head and torso of an older white man with a Van Dyke mustache and short hair. He is wearing pince-nez glasses and a checkered suit coat over a vest and dark tie.	Henry A. du Pont	Army	Captain	(United States) 5th Regiment, U.S. Artillery	Battle of Cedar Creek, Virginia	Oct 19, 1864	By his distinguished gallantry, and voluntary exposure to the enemy's fire at a critical moment, when the Union line had been broken, encouraged his men to stand to their guns, checked the advance of the enemy, and brought off most of his pieces.
—	James R. Durham	Army	Second Lieutenant	12th West Virginia Volunteer Infantry Regiment	Second Battle of Winchester, Virginia	Jun 14, 1863	Led his command over the stone wall, where he was wounded.
—	John Durham	Army	Sergeant	1st Wisconsin Volunteer Infantry Regiment (3 Years)	Battle of Perryville, Ky.	Oct 8, 1862	Seized the flag of his regiment when the color sergeant was shot and advanced with the flag midway between the lines, amid a shower of shot, shell, and bullets, until stopped by his commanding officer.

== E ==
Image	Name	Service	Rank	Unit/Command	Place of action	Date of action	Notes
—	John N. Eckes	Army	Private	Company E, 47th Ohio Volunteer Infantry Regiment	Battle of Vicksburg, Miss.	May 22, 1863	For gallantry in the charge of the volunteer storming party on 22 May 1863, in action at Vicksburg, Mississippi.
samuel e. eddy	Samuel E. Eddy	Army	Private	Company D, 37th Massachusetts Volunteer Infantry Regiment	Battle of Sayler's Creek, Virginia	Apr 6, 1865	Saved the life of the adjutant of his regiment by voluntarily going beyond the line and there killing one of the enemy then in the act of firing upon the wounded officer. Was assailed by several of the enemy, run through the body with a bayonet, and pinned to the ground, but while so. situated he shot and killed his assailant.
	Nathan H. Edgerton	Army	First Lieutenant and Adjutant	6th Regiment United States Colored Troops	Battle of Chaffin's Farm, Virginia	Sep 29, 1864	For extraordinary heroism on 29 September 1864, in action at Chapin's Farm, Virginia. First Lieutenant Edgerton took up the flag after three Color Bearers had been shot down and bore it forward, though himself wounded.
—	David Edwards	Army	Private	(New York (state)) Company H, 146th New York Volunteer Infantry Regiment	Battle of Five Forks, Virginia	Apr 1, 1865	For extraordinary heroism on 1 April 1865, while serving with Company H, 146th New York Infantry, in action at Five Forks, Virginia, for capture of flag
—	John Edwards	Navy	Captain of the Top	(United States Navy) USS Lackawanna	Aboard USS Lackawanna, Battle of Mobile Bay	August 5, 1864	As second captain of a gun on board the U.S.S. Lackawanna during successful attacks against Fort Morgan, rebel gunboats and the ram Tennessee in Mobile Bay, on 5 August 1864. Wounded when an enemy shell struck, Edwards refused to go below for aid and, as heavy return fire continued to strike his vessel, took the place of the first captain and carried out his duties during the prolonged action which resulted in the capture of the prize ram Tennessee and in the damaging and destruction of batteries at Fort Morgan.
	Alexander Calvin Elliott	Army	Sergeant	Company A, 1st Pennsylvania Cavalry	Paines Crossroads, Virginia	Apr 5, 1865	For extraordinary heroism on April 5, 1865, in action at Paines Crossroads, Virginia, for capture of flag
2LT Russell C Elliott, Company B, 3rd Massachusetts Volunteer Cavalry	Russell C. Elliott	Army	Sergeant	Company B, 3rd Massachusetts Volunteer Cavalry	Natchitoches, Louisiana	Apr 19, 1864	For extraordinary heroism on 19 April 1864, in action at Natchitoches, Louisiana. Seeing a Confederate officer in advance of his command, Sergeant Elliott charged on him alone and unaided and captured him.
—	Horace Ellis	Army	Private	Company A, 7th Wisconsin Volunteer Infantry Regiment	Battle of Globe Tavern, Virginia	Aug 21, 1864	For extraordinary heroism on 21 August 1864, in action at Weldon Railroad, Virginia, for capture of flag of 16th Mississippi (Confederate States of America).
—	William Ellis	Army	First Sergeant	Company K, 3rd Wisconsin Volunteer Cavalry Regiment	Dardanelle, Arkansas	January 14, 1865	For extraordinary heroism on 14 January 1865, in action at Dardanelle, Arkansas. First Sergeant Ellis remained at his post after receiving three wounds, and only retired, by his commanding officer's orders, after being wounded the fourth time.
	Thomas Foulds Ellsworth	Army	Captain	Company B, 55th Massachusetts Volunteer Infantry Regiment	Battle of Honey Hill	Nov 30, 1864	For extraordinary heroism on 30 November 1864, in action at Honey Hill, South Carolina. Under a heavy fire Captain Ellsworth carried his wounded commanding officer from the field.
James M Elson, Medal of Honor winner	James M. Elson	Army	Sergeant	Company C, 9th Iowa Infantry	Battle of Vicksburg, Miss.	May 22, 1863	For extraordinary heroism on 22 May 1863, in action at Vicksburg, Mississippi. Sergeant Elson carried the colors in advance of his regiment and was shot down while attempting to plant them on the enemy's works. Name misspelled on award. Real last name Elson.
	Andrew H. Embler	Army	Captain	(New York (state)) Company D, 59th New York Volunteer Infantry Regiment	Battle of Boydton Plank Road, Virginia	Oct 27, 1864	For extraordinary heroism on 27 October 1864, in action at Boydton Plank Road, Virginia. Captain Embler charged at the head of two regiments, which drove the enemy's main body, gained the crest of the hill near the Burgess house and forced a barricade on the Boydton road.
MoH winner Richard Enderlin	Richard Enderlin	Army	Musician	Company B, 73rd Ohio Volunteer Infantry Regiment	Battle of Gettysburg, Pa.	Jul 1, 1863 – Jul 3, 1863	For extraordinary heroism from 1 to 3 July 1863, in action at Gettysburg, Pennsylvania. Musician Enderlin voluntarily took a rifle and served as a soldier in the ranks during the first and second days of the battle. Voluntarily and at his own imminent peril went into the enemy's lines at night and, under a sharp fire, rescued a wounded comrade.
—	James Edgar Engle	Army	Sergeant	97th Pennsylvania Infantry	Bermuda Hundred Campaign, Virginia	May 18, 1864	For extraordinary heroism on 18 May 1864, in action at Bermuda Hundred, Virginia. Sergeant Engle responded to a call for volunteers to carry ammunition to the regiment on the picket line and under a heavy fire from the enemy assisted in carrying a box of ammunition to the front and remained to distribute the same.
Edmund English MoH winner 1891	Edmund English	Army	First Sergeant	Company C, 2nd New Jersey Volunteer Infantry	Battle of the Wilderness, Virginia	May 6, 1864	For extraordinary heroism on 6 May 1864, in action during the Wilderness Campaign, Virginia. During a rout and while under orders to retreat First Sergeant English seized the colors, rallied the men, and drove the enemy back.
—	Thomas English	Navy	Signal Quartermaster	(United States Navy) USS New Ironsides	Aboard USS New Ironsides, First and Second Battles of Fort Fisher	Dec 1864 – Jan 1865	For extraordinary heroism in action while serving on board the U.S.S. New Iron sides during action in several attacks on Fort Fisher, North Carolina, 24 and 25 December 1864; and 13, 14, and 15 January 1865. The ship steamed in and took the lead in the ironclad division close inshore and immediately opened its starboard battery in a barrage of well-directed fire to cause several fires and explosions and dismount several guns during the first two days of fighting. Taken under fire as she steamed into position on 13 January, the New Ironsides fought all day and took on ammunition at night despite severe weather conditions. When the enemy came out of his bombproofs to defend the fort against the storming party, the ship's battery disabled nearly every gun on the fort facing the shore before the cease-fire orders were given by the flagship.
—	Charles D. Ennis	Army	Private	Battery G, 1st Rhode Island Volunteer Light Artillery	Third Battle of Petersburg, Virginia	Apr 2, 1865	for extraordinary heroism on 2 April 1865, in action at Petersburg, Virginia. Private Ennis was one of a detachment of 20 picked artillerymen who voluntarily accompanied an infantry assaulting party and who turned upon the enemy the guns captured in the assault..
—	John P. Erickson	Navy	Captain of the Forecastle	(United States Navy) USS Pontoosuc	Aboard USS Pontoosuc, First and Second Battles of Fort Fisher	Dec 24, 1864 – Feb 22, 1865	For extraordinary heroism in action while serving on board the U.S.S. Pontoosuc during the capture of Fort Fisher and Wilmington, North Carolina, 24 December 1864, to 22 February 1865. Carrying out his duties faithfully throughout this period, Captain of the Forecastle Erickson was so severely wounded in the assault upon Fort Fisher that he was sent to the hospital at Portsmouth, Virginia. Erickson was recommended for his gallantry, skill, and coolness in action while under the fire of the enemy.
Llewellyn Estes MoH winner 1894	Lewellyn G. Estes	Army	Captain and Assistant Adjutant General	1st Maine Volunteer Cavalry Regiment	Flint River, Ga.	Aug 30, 1864	Voluntarily led troops of the 92nd Illinois Volunteer Infantry in a charge over a burning bridge.
—	Coron D. Evans	Army	Private	Company A, 3rd Indiana Volunteer Cavalry Regiment	Battle of Sayler's Creek, Virginia	Apr 6, 1865	Capture of flag of 26th Virginia Infantry (C.S.A.).
	Ira H. Evans	Army	Captain	(United States) 116th Regiment Infantry U.S. Colored Troops	Hatchers Run, Virginia	Apr 2, 1865	Voluntarily passed between the lines, under a heavy fire from the enemy, and obtained important information.
—	James R. Evans	Army	Private	(New York (state)) 62nd New York Volunteer Infantry Regiment	Battle of the Wilderness, Virginia	May 5, 1864	Went out in front of the line under a fierce fire and, in the face of the rapidly advancing enemy, rescued the regimental flag with which the color bearer had fallen.
—	Thomas Evans	Army	Private	54th Pennsylvania Infantry	Battle of Piedmont, Virginia	Jun 5, 1864	Capture of flag of 45th Virginia (C.S.A.).
—	Adelbert Everson	Army	Private	(New York (state)) 185th New York Infantry	Battle of Five Forks, Virginia	Apr 1, 1865	Capture of the enemy flag.
—	John C. Ewing	Army	Private	211th Pennsylvania Infantry	Third Battle of Petersburg, Virginia	Apr 2, 1865	Captured the enemy flag.

== F ==
This along with the *, indicates that the Medal of Honor was awarded posthumously

Image	Name	Service	Rank	Unit/Command	Place of action	Date of action	Notes
—	John A. Falconer	Army	Corporal	Company A, 17th Michigan Volunteer Infantry Regiment	Fort Sanders, Siege of Knoxville, Tenn.	Nov 20, 1863	For extraordinary heroism on 20 November 1863, in action at Fort Sanders, Knoxville, Tennessee. Corporal Falconer conducted the "burning party" of his regiment at the time a charge was made on the enemy's picket line, and burned the house which had sheltered the enemy's sharpshooters, thus insuring success to a hazardous enterprise.
Medal of Honor winner Charles Stuart Fall	Charles S. Fall	Army	Sergeant	Company E, 26th Michigan Volunteer Infantry Regiment	Battle of Spotsylvania Court House, Virginia	May 12, 1864	For extraordinary heroism on 12 May 1864, in action at Spotsylvania Courthouse, Virginia. Sergeant Fall was one of the first to mount the Confederate works, where he bayoneted two of the enemy and captured a Confederate flag, but threw it away to continue the pursuit of the enemy.
Private Timothy Thomas Fallon at Battle of Kennesaw Mountain, Big Shanty, Georgia 1864	Thomas T. Fallon	Army	Private	(New York (state)) 37th New York Volunteer Infantry Regiment	Battle of Williamsburg, Virginia, Battle of Fair Oaks, Virginia, and Battle of Kennesaw Mountain, Georgia.	May 1862 and Jun 1864	For extraordinary heroism on 5 May 1862, in action at Williamsburg, Virginia. Private Fallon assisted in driving rebel skirmishers to their main line. He participated in action at Fair Oaks, Virginia, May 30 - 31, 1862, though excused from duty because of disability. In a charge with his company at Big Shanty, Georgia, June 14 - 15, 1864, he was the first man on the enemy's works.
Medal of Honor winner Benjamin Franklin Falls	Benjamin Falls*	Army	Color Sergeant	Company A, 19th Massachusetts Volunteer Infantry Regiment	Battle of Gettysburg, Pa.	Jul 3, 1863	For extraordinary heroism on 3 July 1863, in action at Gettysburg, Pennsylvania, for capture of flag.
—	Nicholas Fanning	Army	Private	Company B, 4th Iowa Volunteer Cavalry Regiment	Battle of Selma, Ala.	Apr 2, 1865	for extraordinary heroism on 2 April 1865, in action at Selma, Alabama, for capture of silk Confederate States flag and two staff officers.
—	William Farley	Navy	Boatswain's Mate	(United States Navy) USS Marblehead	Aboard USS Marblehead Battle of Legareville	December 25, 1863	For extraordinary heroism in action while serving on board the USS Marblehead off Legareville, Stono River, South Carolina, 25 December 1863, during an engagement with the enemy on John's Island. Behaving in a gallant manner, Boatswain's Mate Farley animated his men and kept up a rapid and effective fire on the enemy throughout the engagement which resulted in the enemy's abandonment of his positions, leaving a caisson and one gun behind.
Medal of Honor winner Sergeant Major Herbert E. Farnsworth 1864	Herbert E. Farnsworth	Army	Sergeant Major	(New York (state)) 10th New York Volunteer Cavalry Regiment	Battle of Trevilian Station, Virginia	Jun 11, 1864	For extraordinary heroism on 11 June 1864, in action at Trevilian Station, Virginia. Sergeant Major Farnsworth voluntarily carried a message which stopped the firing of a Union battery into his regiment, in which service he crossed a ridge in plain view and swept by the fire of both armies.
Medal of Honor winner, United States Congressman, and printer John McCreath Farquhar 1864	John M. Farquhar	Army	Sergeant Major	89th Illinois Volunteer Infantry Regiment	Battle of Stones River, Tenn.	Dec 31, 1862	For extraordinary heroism on 31 December 1862, in action at Stone River, Tennessee. When a break occurred on the extreme right wing of the Army of the Cumberland, Sergeant Major Farquhar rallied fugitives from other commands, and deployed his own regiment, thereby checking the Confederate advance until a new line was established.
Photo identified as possibly Medal of Honor winner Edward Farrell c1864	Edward Farrell	Navy	Quartermaster	(United States Navy) USS Owasco	Aboard USS Owasco, Battle of Forts Jackson and St. Philip	April 24, 1862	For extraordinary heroism in action while serving on board the USS Owasco during the attack upon Forts Jackson and St. Philip, Louisiana, 24 April 1862. Stationed at the masthead during these operations, Quartermaster Farrell observed and reported the effect of the fire of our guns in such a manner as to make his intelligence, coolness and capacity conspicuous.
Medal of Honor winner Charles Henry Fasnacht c1864	Charles H. Fasnacht	Army	Sergeant	Company A, 99th Pennsylvania Infantry	Battle of Spotsylvania Court House, Virginia	May 12, 1864	For extraordinary heroism on 12 May 1864, in action at Spotsylvania, Virginia, for capture of flag of 2d Louisiana Tigers (Confederate States of America) in a hand-to-hand contest.
Medal of Honor winner John Barclay Fassett c1864	John B. Fassett	Army	Captain	Company F, 23rd Pennsylvania Infantry	Battle of Gettysburg, Pa.	Jul 2, 1863	For extraordinary heroism on 2 July 1863, in action at Gettysburg, Pennsylvania. While acting as an aide, Captain Fassett voluntarily led a regiment to the relief of a battery and recaptured its guns from the enemy.
Medal of Honor winner Albert E. Fernald	Albert E. Fernald	Army	First Lieutenant	Company F, 20th Maine Volunteer Infantry Regiment	Battle of Five Forks, Virginia	Apr 1, 1865	For extraordinary heroism on 1 April 1865, in action at Five Forks, Virginia. During a rush at the enemy, Lieutenant Fernald seized, during a scuffle, the flag of the 9th Virginia Infantry (Confederate States of America).
Medal of Honor winner John H. Ferrell (April 15, 1829 – April 17, 1900)	John H. Ferrell	Navy	Civilian pilot	(United States Navy) USS Neosho	Aboard USS Neosho	December 6, 1864	For extraordinary heroism in action on board the U.S. Monitor NEOSHO during the engagement with enemy batteries at Bells Mills, Cumberland River, near Nashville, Tennessee, 6 December 1864. Carrying out his duties courageously during the engagement, Civilian Pilot John Ferrell gallantly left the pilothouse after the flag and signal staffs of that vessel had been shot away and, taking the flag which was drooping over the wheelhouse, make it fast to the stump of the highest mast remaining although the ship was still under a heavy fire from the enemy.
—	Daniel T. Ferrier	Army	Sergeant	Company K, 2nd Indiana Volunteer Cavalry Regiment	Varnells Station, Ga.	May 9, 1864	For extraordinary heroism on 9 May 1864, in action at Varnells Station, Georgia. While his regiment was retreating, Sergeant Ferrier voluntarily gave up his horse to his brigade commander who had been unhorsed and was in danger of capture, thereby enabling him to rejoin and rally the disorganized troops. Sergeant Ferrier himself was captured and confined in Confederate prisons, from which he escaped and, after great hardship, rejoined the Union lines.
Medal of Honor winner Eugene W. Ferris	Eugene W. Ferris	Army	Captain and Adjutant	Company D, 30th Massachusetts Volunteer Infantry Regiment	Berryville, Virginia	Apr 1, 1865	For extraordinary heroism on 1 April 1865, in action at Berryville, Virginia. Accompanied only by an orderly, outside the lines of the Army, First Lieutenant Ferris gallantly resisted an attack of five of Mosby's cavalry, mortally wounded the leader of the party, seized his horse and pistols, wounded three more, and, though wounded himself, escaped.
Medal of Honor winner Frank Emil Fesq c1915	Frank E. Fesq	Army	Private	40th New Jersey Volunteer Infantry	Third Battle of Petersburg, Virginia	Apr 2, 1865	For extraordinary heroism on 2 April 1865, while serving with Company A, 40th New Jersey Infantry, in action at Petersburg, Virginia, for capture of flag of 18th North Carolina (Confederate States of America) within the enemy's works.
Henry S. Finkenbiner MoH winner	Henry S. Finkenbiner	Army	Private	Company D, 107th Ohio Volunteer Infantry Regiment	Dingle's Mill, South Carolina	April 9, 1865	For extraordinary heroism on 9 April 1865, in action at Dingle's Mill, South Carolina. While on the advance skirmish line and within direct and close fire of the enemy's artillery, Private Finkenbiner crossed the mill race on a burning bridge and ascertained the enemy's position.
—	John H. Fisher	Army	First Lieutenant	55th Illinois Volunteer Infantry Regiment	Battle of Vicksburg, Miss.	May 22, 1863	For gallantry in the charge of the volunteer storming party on 22 May 1863, in action at Vicksburg, Mississippi.
Medal of Honor winner Joseph Fisher c1897	Joseph Fisher	Army	Corporal	Company C, 61st Pennsylvania Infantry	Third Battle of Petersburg, Virginia	Apr 2, 1865	For extraordinary heroism on 2 April 1865, in action at Petersburg, Virginia. Corporal Fisher carried the colors 50 yards in advance of his regiment, and after being painfully wounded attempted to crawl into the enemy's works in an endeavor to plant his flag thereon.
—	Thomas Fitzpatrick	Navy	Coxswain	(United States Navy) USS Hartford	Aboard USS Hartford, Battle of Mobile Bay	August 5, 1864	for extraordinary heroism in action, serving as Captain of the No. 1 gun on board the flagship U.S.S. Hartford, during action against rebel gunboats, the ram Tennessee and Fort Morgan in Mobile Bay, Alabama, 5 August 1864. Although struck several times in the face by splinters, and with his gun disabled when a shell burst between the two forward 9-inch guns, killing and wounding 15 men, Coxswain Fitzpatrick, within a few minutes, had the gun in working order again with new track, breeching and side tackle, had sent the wounded below, cleared the area of other casualties, and was fighting his gun as before. He served as an inspiration to the members of his crew and contributed to the success of the action in which the Tennessee was captured.
—	Augustin D. Flanagan	Army	Sergeant	Company A, 55th Pennsylvania Infantry	Battle of Chaffin's Farm, Virginia	Sep 29, 1864	For extraordinary heroism on 29 September 1864, in action at Chapin's Farm, Virginia. For gallantry in the charge on the enemy's works; rushing forward with the colors and calling upon the men to follow him; Sergeant Flanagan was severely wounded.
—	James Flannigan	Army	Private	Company H, 2nd Minnesota Volunteer Infantry Regiment	Nolensville, Tenn.	Feb 15, 1863	For extraordinary heroism on 15 February 1863, in action at Nolensville, Tennessee. Private Flannigan was one of a detachment of 16 men who heroically defended a wagon train against the attack of 125 cavalry, repulsed the attack and saved the train.
	Christian A. Fleetwood	Army	Sergeant Major	4th Regiment United States Colored Troops	Battle of Chaffin's Farm, Virginia	Sep 29, 1864	For extraordinary heroism on 29 September 1864, in action at Chapin's Farm, Virginia. Sergeant Major Fleetwood seized the colors, after two Color Bearers had been shot down, and bore them nobly through the fight.
—	Thomas S. Flood	Navy	Pilot	(United States Navy) USS Pensacola	Aboard USS Pensacola, Battle of Forts Jackson and St. Philip	April 24, 1862 and April 25, 1862	For extraordinary heroism in action while serving on board the U.S.S. Pensacola in the attack on Forts Jackson and St. Philip, Louisiana, and at the taking of New Orleans, 24 and 25 April 1862. Swept from the bridge by a shell which wounded the Signal Quartermaster, Navy Boy Thomas Flood returned to the bridge after assisting the wounded man below and taking over his duties, performed them with coolness, exactitude and the fidelity of a veteran Seaman. His intelligence and character cannot be spoken of too warmly.
—	Christopher Flynn	Army	Corporal	14th Connecticut Infantry Regiment	Battle of Gettysburg, Pa.	Jul 3, 1863	For extraordinary heroism on 3 July 1863, in action at Gettysburg, Pennsylvania, for capture of flag of 52d North Carolina Infantry (Confederate States of America).
	James E. Flynn	Army	Sergeant	Company G, 6th Missouri Volunteer Infantry	Battle of Vicksburg, Miss.	May 22, 1863	For gallantry in the charge of the volunteer storming party on 22 May 1863, in action at Vicksburg, Mississippi
Medal of Honor recipient Joseph Leonard Follett in GAR uniform c1897	Joseph L. Follett	Army	Sergeant	Battery G, 1st Missouri Light Artillery	Battle of Island Number Ten, New Madrid, Mo. and Battle of Stones River, Tenn.	Mar 3, 1862 and Dec 31, 1862	For extraordinary heroism on 3 March 1862, in action at New Madrid, Missouri. Sergeant Follett remained on duty though severely wounded. On 31 December 1862, while procuring ammunition from the supply train at Stone River, Tennessee, he was captured, but made his escape, secured the ammunition, and in less than an hour from the time of his capture had the batteries supplied.
	Manning F. Force	Army	Brigadier General	20th Ohio Volunteer Infantry Regiment	Battle of Atlanta, Ga.	Jul 22, 1864	For extraordinary heroism on 22 July 1864, while serving with U.S. Volunteers, in action at Atlanta, Georgia. Brigadier General Force charged upon the enemy's works, and after their capture defended his position against assaults of the enemy until he was severely wounded.
—	George W. Ford	Army	First Lieutenant	(New York (state)) 88th New York Volunteer Infantry Regiment	Battle of Sayler's Creek, Virginia	Apr 6, 1865	For extraordinary heroism on 6 April 1865, in action at Deatonsville (Sailor's Creek), Virginia, for capture of flag.
—	Alexander A. Forman	Army	Corporal	Company E, 7th Michigan Volunteer Infantry Regiment	Battle of Fair Oaks, Virginia	May 31, 1862	For extraordinary heroism on 31 May 1862, in action at Fair Oaks, Virginia. Although wounded, Corporal Forman continued fighting until, fainting from loss of blood, he was carried off the field.
Medal of Honor recipient Frederick W Fout c1896	Frederick W. Fout	Army	Second Lieutenant	15th Independent Battery, Indiana Light Artillery	near Harpers Ferry, W. Va.	Sep 15, 1862	for extraordinary heroism on 15 September 1862, in action at Harpers Ferry, West Virginia. Second Lieutenant Fout voluntarily gathered the men of the battery together, re-manned the guns, which had been ordered abandoned by an officer, opened fire, and kept up the same on the enemy until after the surrender.
Medal of Honor recipient Henry Fox c1899	Henry Fox	Army	Sergeant	106th Illinois Volunteer Infantry Regiment	near Jackson, Tenn.	Dec 23, 1862	For extraordinary heroism on 23 December 1862, in action at Jackson, Tennessee. When his command was surrounded by a greatly superior force, Sergeant Fox voluntarily left the shelter of the breastworks, crossed an open railway trestle under a concentrated fire from the enemy, made his way out and secured reinforcements for the relief of his command.
—	Henry M. Fox	Army	Sergeant	5th Michigan Volunteer Cavalry Regiment	Battle of Opequon, Virginia	Sep 19, 1864	For extraordinary heroism on 19 September 1864, in action at Winchester, Virginia, for capture of flag.
Medal of Honor recipient Nicholas Fox c1898 wearing GAR cap	Nicholas Fox	Army	Private	Company H, 28th Connecticut Volunteer Infantry Regiment	Siege of Port Hudson, Louisiana	Jun 14, 1863	For extraordinary heroism on 14 June 1863, in action at Port Hudson, Louisiana. Private Fox made two trips across an open space, in the face of the enemy's concentrated fire, and secured water for the sick and wounded.
—	William R. Fox	Army	Private	Company A, 95th Pennsylvania Volunteer Infantry	Third Battle of Petersburg, Virginia	Apr 2, 1865	for extraordinary heroism on 2 April 1865, in action at Petersburg, Virginia. Private Fox bravely assisted in the capture of one of the enemy's guns; with the first troops to enter the city, captured the flag of the Confederate customhouse.
—	Charles H. Foy	Navy	Signal Quartermaster	(United States Navy) USS Rhode Island	Aboard USS Rhode Island, Second Battle of Fort Fisher	January 13, 1865 – January 15, 1865	For extraordinary heroism in action while serving on board the U.S.S. Rhode Island during the action with Fort Fisher and the Federal Point batteries, North Carolina, 13 to 15 January 1865. Carrying out his duties courageously during the battle, Signal Quartermaster Foy continued to be outstanding by his good conduct and faithful services throughout this engagement which resulted in a heavy casualty list when an attempt was made to storm Fort Fisher.
—	William J. Franks	Navy	Seaman	(United States Navy) USS Marmora (1862)	Aboard USS Marmora (1862), Yazoo City, Mississippi	Mar 5, 1864	For extraordinary heroism in action while serving on board the U.S.S. Marmora off Yazoo City, Mississippi, 5 March 1864. Embarking from the Marmora with a 12-pound howitzer mounted on a field carriage, Seaman Franks landed with the gun and crew in the midst of heated battle and, bravely standing by his gun despite enemy rifle fire which cut the gun carriage and rammer contributed to the turning back of the enemy during the fierce engagement.
Medal of Honor Recipient Joseph Frantz in 1894	Joseph Frantz	Army	Private	Company E, 83rd Indiana Volunteer Infantry Regiment	Vicksburg, Mississippi	May 22, 1863	For gallantry in the charge of the volunteer storming party on 22 May 1863, in action at Vicksburg, Mississippi.
Medal of Honor recipient William W. Fraser	William W. Fraser	Army	Private	Company I, 97th Illinois Volunteer Infantry Regiment	Battle of Vicksburg, Miss.	May 22, 1863	For gallantry in the charge of the volunteer storming party on 22 May 1863, in action at Vicksburg, Mississippi (last name sometimes spelled "Frazier").
1st Row L-R: Orena Anna McBay Freeman, Marvin / Marion Freeman, Bet Freeman, Felix Gibbs Freeman, Archibald Freeman c1896 2nd Row, L-R: Frank F Freeman, Archibald Bertrand Freeman, Margaret "Maggie" Freeman	Archibald C. Freeman	Army	Private	(New York (state)) 124th New York Volunteer Infantry Regiment	Battle of Spotsylvania Court House, Virginia	May 12, 1864	For extraordinary heroism on 12 May 1864, in action at Spotsylvania, Virginia, for capture of flag of 17th Louisiana (Confederate States of America)..
	Henry B. Freeman	Army	First Lieutenant	(United States) 18th U.S. Infantry Regiment	Battle of Stones River, Tenn.	Dec 31, 1862	For extraordinary heroism on 31 December 1862, in action at Stone River, Tennessee. First Lieutenant Freeman voluntarily went to the front and picked up and carried to a place of safety, under a heavy fire from the enemy, an acting field officer who had been wounded, and was about to fall into enemy hands
MoH winner c1890	Martin Freeman	Navy	Civilian pilot	(United States Navy) USS Hartford	Aboard USS Hartford, Battle of Mobile Bay	August 5, 1864	For extraordinary heroism in action as Pilot of the flagship, U.S.S. HARTFORD, during action against Fort Morgan, rebel gunboats and the ram Tennessee, in Mobile Bay, Alabama, 5 August 1864. With his ship under terrific enemy shellfire, Civilian Pilot Martin Freeman calmly remained at his station in the maintop and skillfully piloted the ships into the bay. He rendered gallant service throughout the prolonged battle in which the rebel gunboats were captured or driven off, the prize ram Tennessee forced to surrender, and the fort successfully attacked.
Medal of Honor winner William Henry Freeman c1865	William H. Freeman	Army	Private	(New York (state)) Company B, 169th New York Volunteer Infantry	Second Battle of Fort Fisher, North Carolina	Jan 15, 1865	For extraordinary heroism on 15 January 1865, in action at Fort Fisher, North Carolina. Private Freeman volunteered to carry the brigade flag after the bearer was wounded.
Samuel S French Medal of Honor, 7th Michigan Volunteer Infantry Regiment	Samuel S. French	Army	Private	Company E, 7th Michigan Volunteer Infantry Regiment	Battle of Seven Pines, Virginia	May 31, 1862	For extraordinary heroism on 31 May 1862, in action at Fair Oaks, Virginia. Private French continued fighting, although wounded, until he fainted from loss of blood.
Possible photo of Franz Frey	Franz Frey	Army	Corporal	Company H, 37th Ohio Volunteer Infantry Regiment	Battle of Vicksburg, Miss.	May 22, 1863	For gallantry in the charge of the volunteer storming party on 22 May 1863, in action at Vicksburg, Mississippi
	Jacob G. Frick	Army	Colonel	129th Pennsylvania Volunteer Infantry Regiment	Fredericksburg, Virginia and Chancellorsville, Virginia	December 13, 1862 and May 3, 1863	For extraordinary heroism on 13 December 1862, in action at Fredericksburg, Virginia. Colonel Frick seized the colors and led the command through a terrible fire of cannon and musketry. In a hand-to-hand fight at Chancellorsville, Virginia, on 3 May 1863, he recaptured the colors of his regiment.
	John B. Frisbee	Navy	Gunner's Mate	(United States Navy) USS Pinola	Aboard USS Pinola, Battle of Forts Jackson and St. Philip	April 24, 1862	For extraordinary heroism in action while serving on board the U.S. Steam Gunboat Pinola during action against Forts Jackson and St. Philip, Louisiana, and during the taking of New Orleans, 24 April 1862. While engaged in the bombardment of Fort St. Philip, Gunner's Mate Frisbee, acting courageously and without personal regard, closed the powder magazine which had been set afire by enemy shelling and shut off his avenue of escape, thereby setting a high example of bravery. He served courageously throughout these engagements which resulted in the taking of the Forts Jackson and St. Philip and in the surrender of New Orleans.
	Henry F. Frizzell	Army	Private	6th Missouri Volunteer Infantry	Battle of Vicksburg, Miss.	May 22, 1863	For gallantry in the charge of the volunteer storming party on 22 May 1863, in action at Vicksburg, Mississippi. Last name sometimes spelled "Frazell"
Isaac Nicholas Fry, Orderly Sergeant, USMC MoH winner	Isaac N. Fry	Marine Corps	Orderly Sergeant	(United States Marine Corps) USS Ticonderoga	Aboard USS Ticonderoga, Second Battle of Fort Fisher	January 13, 1865 – January 15, 1865	For extraordinary heroism in action on board the U.S.S. TICONDEROGA during attacks on Fort Fisher, 13 to 15 January 1865. As orderly sergeant of Marine guard, and captain of a gun, Orderly Sergeant Fry performed his duties with skill and courage as the TICONDEROGA maintained a well-placed fire upon the batteries to the left of the palisades during the initial phases of the three-day battle, and thereafter, as she considerably lessened the firing power of guns on the mount which had been turned upon our assaulting columns. During this action the flag was planted on one of the strongest fortifications possessed by the rebels.
	Frederick Füger	Army	Sergeant	(United States) Battery A, 4th U.S. Artillery	Battle of Gettysburg, Pa.	Jul 3, 1863	For extraordinary heroism on 3 July 1863, in action at Gettysburg, Pennsylvania. All the officers of his battery having been killed or wounded and five of its guns disabled in Pickett's assault, Sergeant Füger succeeded to the command and fought the remaining gun with most distinguished gallantry until the battery was ordered withdrawn.
Pvt West Funk, 121st Pennsylvania 1862	West Funk	Army	Major	121st Pennsylvania Volunteer Infantry Regiment	Battle of Appomattox Courthouse, Virginia	Apr 9, 1865	For extraordinary heroism on 9 April 1865, in action at Appomattox Courthouse, Virginia, for capture of flag of 46th Virginia Infantry (Confederate States of America).
	Chester S. Furman	Army	Corporal	Company A, 6th Pennsylvania Reserves	Battle of Gettysburg, Pa.	Jul 2, 1863	For extraordinary heroism on 2 July 1863, in action at Gettysburg, Pennsylvania. Corporal Furman was one of six volunteers who charged upon a log house near Devil's Den, where a squad of the enemy's sharpshooters were sheltered, and compelled their surrender.
Head of an older white man with a drooping mustache wearing a checkered suit coat and tie.	Frank Furness	Army	Captain	6th Pennsylvania Cavalry Regiment	Battle of Trevilian Station, Virginia	Jun 12, 1864	For extraordinary heroism on 12 June 1864, in action at Trevilian Station, Virginia. Captain Furness voluntarily carried a box of ammunition across an open space swept by the enemy's fire to the relief of an outpost whose ammunition had become almost exhausted, but which was thus enabled to hold its important position.
