= Jacob Cart =

- Born: c. 1843; Carlisle, Pennsylvania
- Died: April 24, 1882; Carlisle, Pennsylvania
- Burial place: Ashland Cemetery
- Military career
- Allegiance: United States of America
- Branch: United States Army
- Rank: Private
- Unit: 7th Pennsylvania Reserve Regiment - Company A
- Conflicts: Battle of Fredericksburg
- Awards: Medal of Honor

Private Jacob Cart (c. 1843 – April 24, 1882) was an American soldier who fought in the American Civil War. Cart received the country's highest award for bravery during combat, the Medal of Honor, for his action during the Battle of Fredericksburg in Virginia on 13 December 1862. He was honored with the award on 25 November 1864.

== Biography ==
Cart was born in Carlisle, Pennsylvania, in about 1843. He enlisted into the 7th Pennsylvania Reserve Regiment. He died on 24 April 1882, and his remains are interred at Ashland Cemetery in Carlisle.

== Medal of Honor citation ==
Capture of flag of 19th Georgia Infantry (C.S.A.), wresting it from the hands of the color bearer.

== See also ==
- List of American Civil War Medal of Honor recipients: A–F
