= Carlton N. Camp =

American Civil War soldier

- Born: January 5, 1845; Hanover, New Hampshire, U.S.
- Died: September 1, 1926 (aged 81)
- Burial place: Etna Cemetery, Hanover, New Hampshire
- Military career
- Allegiance: United States of America
- Branch: United States Army
- Rank: Private
- Unit: 18th Regiment New Hampshire Volunteer Infantry - Company B
- Conflicts: Third Battle of Petersburg
- Awards: Medal of Honor

Private Carlton N. Camp (January 5, 1845 – September 1, 1926) was an American soldier who fought in the American Civil War. Camp received the country's highest award for bravery during combat, the Medal of Honor, for his action during the Third Battle of Petersburg in Virginia on 2 April 1865. He was honored with the award on 21 December 1909.

== Biography ==
Camp was born on 5 January 1845 in Hanover, New Hampshire. He enlisted into the 18th New Hampshire Infantry on 6 September 1864. He died on 1 September 1926 and his remains are interred at the Etna Cemetery in Hanover, New Hampshire.

== Medal of Honor citation ==
Brought off from the picket line, under heavy fire, a comrade who had been shot through both legs.

== See also ==
- List of American Civil War Medal of Honor recipients: A–F
