= William J. Brewer =

American Civil War soldier

- Born: c. 1843; Putnam County, New York
- Died: June 19, 1878
- Military career
- Allegiance: United States of America
- Branch: United States Army; Union Army
- Rank: Private
- Unit: (New York (state)) 2nd Regiment New York Volunteer Cavalry
- Conflicts: American Civil War: Appomattox Campaign
- Awards: Medal of Honor

William John Brewer (c. 1843 - June 19, 1878) was an American soldier who received the Medal of Honor for valor during the American Civil War.

== Biography ==
Brewer served in the Union Army in the 2nd New York Cavalry. He received the Medal of Honor on May 3, 1865, for his actions during the Appomattox campaign.

== Medal of Honor citation ==
Citation:

Capture of engineer flag, Army of Northern Virginia.

== See also ==
- List of American Civil War Medal of Honor recipients: A-F
