= Addison J. Hodges =

- Born: October 24, 1841; Hillsdale, Michigan, US
- Died: July 28, 1923 (aged 81); Adrian, Michigan, US
- Burial place: Ogden Zion Cemetery, Blissfield, Michigan
- Military career
- Allegiance: United States
- Branch: United States Army; Union Army
- Service years: 1861–1864
- Rank: Private
- Units: Company B, 47th Ohio Volunteer Infantry Regiment
- Conflicts: American Civil War
- Awards: Medal of Honor

Addison J. Hodges (November 26, 1842 – July 28, 1923) was a decorated hero of the Union Army in the American Civil War. He was born in Hillsdale, Michigan.

== War service ==
Hodges mustered on 15 June 1861 to Company B of the 47th Ohio Volunteer Infantry Regiment.

According to the Military Times Hall of Valor, "on 3 May 1863, while serving with Company B, 47th Ohio Infantry, in action at Vicksburg, Mississippi. Private Hodges was one of a party which volunteered and attempted to run the enemy's batteries with a steam tug and two barges loaded with subsistence stores." Hodges and nine others in Company B did this while Confederate States Army batteries were shooting at them "under cover of darkness"

Captain William Henry Ward asked for ten volunteers, but originally got twelve. He got permission to take the twelve. Hodges was one of the original volunteers, but as many more men wanted to go, Hodges sold his spot. When Ward found out, he made Hodges go as well. These fifteen were joined by fifteen men of the 27th Missouri. The tug towing the barges took a direct hit, blew up, and sank. The explosion set the two barges on fire. Sixteen of the thirty-five were taken prisoner. Only four of the thirty-five evaded capture. Fifteen had perished. The ten Prisoners of War from the 47th were freed when Vicksburg surrendered in July.

Rank and organization: Private, Company B, 47th Ohio Infantry. Place and date: At Vicksburg, MS., May 3, 1863

Citation:

Was one of a party that volunteered and attempted to run the enemy's batteries with a steam tug and 2 barges loaded with subsistence stores.

After liberation, Hodges rejoined the 47th and was promoted to Corporal. Hodges mustered out near Atlanta in May and liberated in September and mustered out 26 September 1864.

== Post War ==
Hodges returned to Adrian, Michigan and married Eliza C Colvin. They had three children. Hodges was awarded his Medal of Honor "for extreme bravery under fire" on December 31, 1907.

== See also ==
- Siege of Vicksburg
- 47th Ohio Volunteer Infantry Regiment
- List of Medal of Honor recipients
- List of American Civil War Medal of Honor recipients: G–L
