= John H. Brown =

John H. Brown may refer to:

- John H. Brown (scholar) (born 1948), American scholar of public diplomacy
- John H. Brown (Medal of Honor) (1842–1898), American soldier and Civil War Medal of Honor recipient
- John H. Brown Jr. (1891–1963), United States Navy admiral and American football player
- John Harold Brown (1886–1974), member of the Tasmanian House of Assembly
- John Harties Brown (1834–1905), Canadian soldier who fought in the American Civil War
- John Henry Brown (1820–1895), Texas politician, chaired Texas articles of Secession

== See also ==
- John Henry Hobart Brown (1831–1888), American Episcopal bishop of Fond du Lac, Wisconsin
- John Henry Owen Brown (1908–1965), Royal Artillery quartermaster sergeant and espionage agent
