= 47th Ohio Infantry Regiment =

- Active: August 13, 1861, to August 11, 1865
- Country: United States
- Allegiance: Union
- Branch: Union Army
- Type: Infantry
- Engagements: Battle of Carnifex Ferry; Siege of Vicksburg; Siege of Jackson; Chattanooga campaign; Battle of Missionary Ridge; Atlanta campaign; Battle of Resaca; Battle of Dallas; Battle of New Hope Church; Battle of Allatoona; Battle of Kennesaw Mountain; Battle of Atlanta; Siege of Atlanta; Battle of Jonesboro; Battle of Lovejoy's Station; Sherman's March to the Sea; Carolinas campaign; Battle of Bentonville

Commanders
- Colonel: Frederick Poschner 1861–1862
- Colonel: Lyman S. Elliott 1862–1863
- Colonel: Augustus C. Parry 1863–1865

The 47th Ohio Infantry Regiment was an infantry regiment in the Union Army during the American Civil War. The regiment had 14 Medal of Honor recipients, the most of any Ohio regiment during the war.

== Service ==
The 47th Ohio Infantry Regiment was organized at Camp Dennison near Cincinnati, Ohio and mustered on August 13, 1861, for three years service under the command of Colonel Frederick Poschner.

The regiment was attached to McCook's Brigade, Kanawha District, West Virginia, to October 1861. 1st Brigade, Kanawha Division, West Virginia, to March 1862. 2nd Brigade, Kanawha Division, West Virginia, to May 1862. 3rd Brigade, Kanawha Division, West Virginia, to August 1862. District of the Kanawha, West Virginia, Department of the Ohio, to December 1862. Ewing's Brigade, Kanawha Division, West Virginia, to January 1863. 3rd Brigade, 2nd Division, XV Corps, Army of the Tennessee, to October 1863. 2nd Brigade, 2nd Division, XV Corps, to June 1865. Department of Arkansas to August 1865.

The 47th Ohio Infantry mustered out of service at Little Rock, Arkansas, on August 11, 1865.

== Detailed service ==
=== 1861 ===
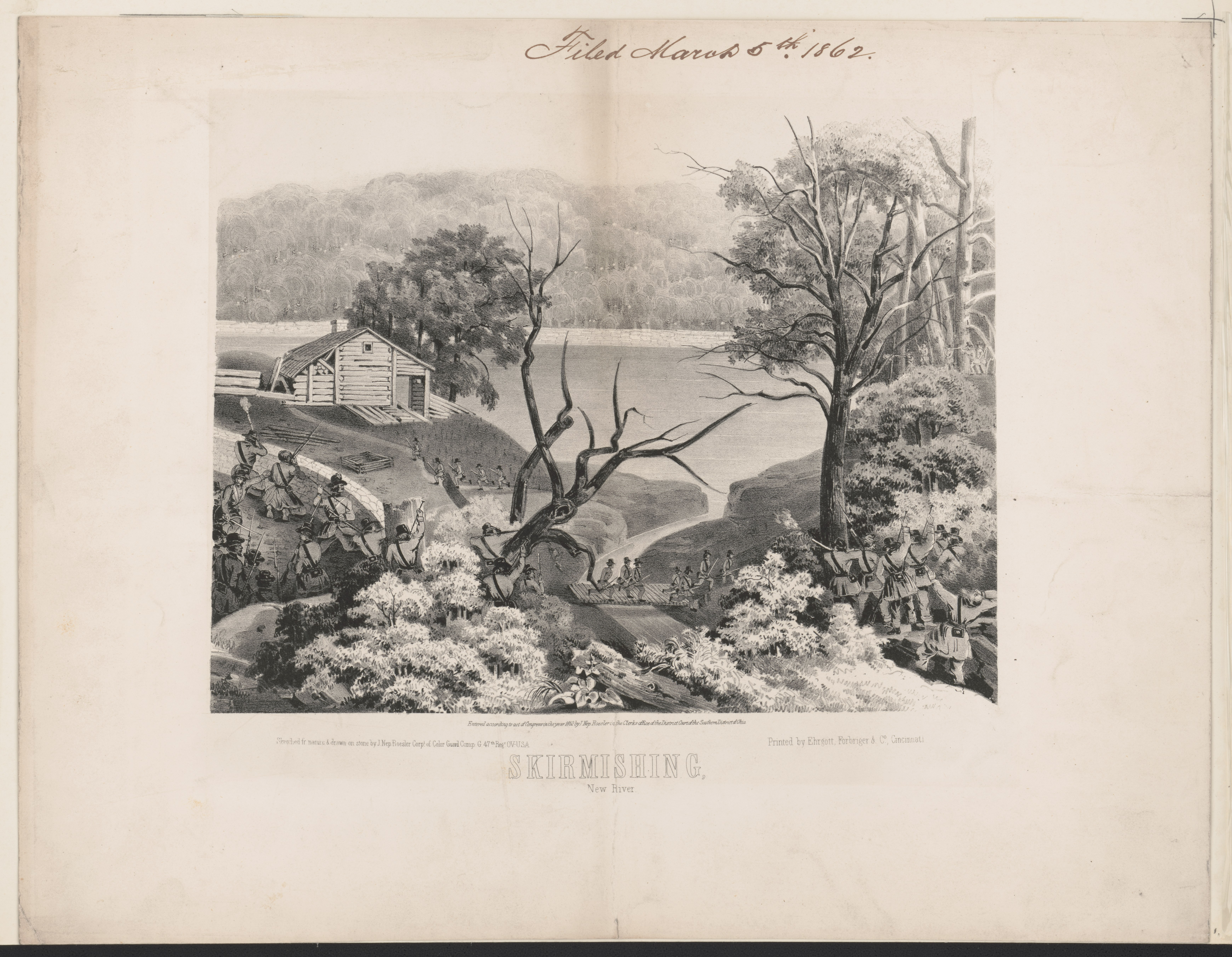
Skirmishing at the New River

- Ordered to Clarksburg, Va., August 27; then moved to Weston August 29.
- Battle of Carnifex Ferry, Va., September 10, 1861.
- Advance to Camp Lookout and Big Sewell Mountain September 24–26.
- Retreat to Camp Anderson October 6–9.
- Operations in the Kanawha Valley and New River Region October 19-November 16.
- Moved to Gauley Bridge December 6, and duty there until April 23, 1862.

=== 1862 ===
- Expedition to Lewisburg April 23-May 10.
- Moved to Meadow Bluff May 29.
- Expedition to Salt Sulphur Springs June 22–25.
- Duty there until August.
- Moved to Gauley Bridge, thence to Summerville September 3.
- Campaign in the Kanawha Valley September 6–16.
- Retreat to Gauley Bridge September 10.
- Cotton Hill, Loop Creek, and Armstrong's Creek September 11.
- Charleston September 12.
- Duty at Point Pleasant and in the Kanawha Valley until December.

=== 1863 ===
- Ordered to Louisville, Ky., December 30; then to Memphis, Tenn., and to Young's Point, La., January 21, 1863.
- Expedition to Rolling Fork via Muddy, Steele's, and Black Bayous and Deer Creek March 14–27.
- Demonstrations on Haines and Drumgould's Bluffs April 29-May 2.
- Moved to Join army in rear of Vicksburg, Miss., May 2–14 via Richmond and Grand Gulf.
- Siege of Vicksburg May 18-July 4.
- Assaults on Vicksburg May 19 and 22.
- Advance on Jackson, Miss., July 4–10.
- Siege of Jackson, Miss., July 10–17.
- At Camp Sherman, Big Black, until September 26.
- Moved to Memphis, Tenn., then march to Chattanooga September 26-November 21.
- Operations on Memphis & Charleston Railroad in Alabama October 20–29.
- Bear Creek, Tuscumbia, October 27.
- Chattanooga-Ringgold Campaign November 23–27
- Tunnel Hill November 23–24.
- Missionary Ridge November 25.
- Pursuit to Graysville November 26–27.
- March to relief of Knoxville November 28-December 8.
- Return to Bellefonte, Ala., then moved to Larkins' Landing, Ala.

=== 1864 ===
- Reconnaissance to Rome January 25-February 5, 1864.
- Reenlisted March 8. Veterans on furlough March 18-May 3.
- Atlanta Campaign May to September. Demonstrations on Resaca May 8–13.
- Near Resaca May 13.
- Battle of Resaca May 14–15.
- Advance on Dallas May 18–25.
- Operations on line of Pumpkin Vine Creek and battles about Dallas, New Hope Church, and Allatoona Hills May 25-June 5.
- Operations about Marietta and against Kennesaw Mountain June 10-July 2.
- Assault on Kennesaw June 27.
- Nickajack Creek July 2–5.
- Ruff's Mills July 3–4.
- Chattahoochie River July 5–17.
- Battle of Atlanta July 22.
- Siege of Atlanta July 22-August 25.
- Flank movement on Jonesboro August 25–30.
- Battle of Jonesboro August 31-September 1.
- Lovejoy's Station September 2–6.
- Operations against Hood in northern Georgia and northern Alabama September 29-November 3.
- Turkeytown and Gadsden Road October 25.
- March to the sea November 15-December 10.
- Siege of Savannah December 10–21.
- Fort McAllister December 13.

=== 1865 ===
- Campaign of the Carolinas January to April 1865.
- Cannon's Bridge, South Edisto River, S.C., February 8.
- North Edisto River February 12–13.
- Columbia February 15–17.
- Battle of Bentonville, N.C., March 20–21.
- Occupation of Goldsboro March 24.
- Advance on Raleigh April 10–14.
- Bennett's House April 26.
- Surrender of Johnston and his army.
- March to Washington, D.C., via Richmond, Va., April 29-May 30.
- Grand Review of the Armies May 24.
- Moved to Louisville, Ky., June; then to Little Rock, Ark., and duty there until August.

== Casualties ==
The regiment lost a total of 219 men during service; 2 officers and 80 enlisted men killed or mortally wounded, 1 officer and 136 enlisted men died of disease.

== Commanders ==
- Colonel Frederick Poschner
- Colonel Lyman S. Elliott
- Colonel Augustus Commodore Parry

== Notable members ==
- Private Christian Albert, Company G - Medal of Honor —Participating in a diversionary "forlorn hope" attack on Confederate defenses, 22 May 1863.
- Private Frederick A. Ballen, Company B - Medal of Honor recipient for action during the siege of Vicksburg, May 3, 1863
- 1st Sergeant John H. Brown, Company A - Medal of Honor recipient for action during the siege of Vicksburg, May 19, 1863.
- Assistant Surgeon Andrew Davidson - Medal of Honor recipient for action during the siege of Vicksburg, May 3, 1863.
- Corporal Richard W. De Witt, Company D - Medal of Honor —Participating in a diversionary "forlorn hope" attack on Confederate defenses, 22 May 1863.
- Private John N. Eckes, Company E - Medal of Honor — Participating in the same "forlorn hope."
- Private Thomas Guinn, Company D - Medal of Honor — Participating in the same "forlorn hope."
- Private John Hack, Company B - Medal of Honor recipient for action during the siege of Vicksburg, May 3, 1863.
- Private Addison J. Hodges, Company B - Medal of Honor recipient for action during the siege of Vicksburg, May 3, 1863.
- Corporal Henry Lewis, Company B - Medal of Honor recipient for action during the siege of Vicksburg, May 3, 1863.
- Corporal Henry H. Nash, Company B - Medal of Honor recipient for action during the siege of Vicksburg, May 3, 1863.
- Private Henry C. Peters, Company B - Medal of Honor recipient for action during the siege of Vicksburg, May 3, 1863.
- Private Peter Sype, Company B - Medal of Honor recipient for action during the siege of Vicksburg, May 3, 1863.
- Captain William Henry Ward, Company B - Medal of Honor recipient for action during the siege of Vicksburg, May 3, 1863.

== See also ==
- List of Ohio Civil War units
- Ohio in the Civil War
