= David Carpenter House =

Historic house in Michigan, United States

- U.S. National Register of Historic Places
- Michigan State Historic Site
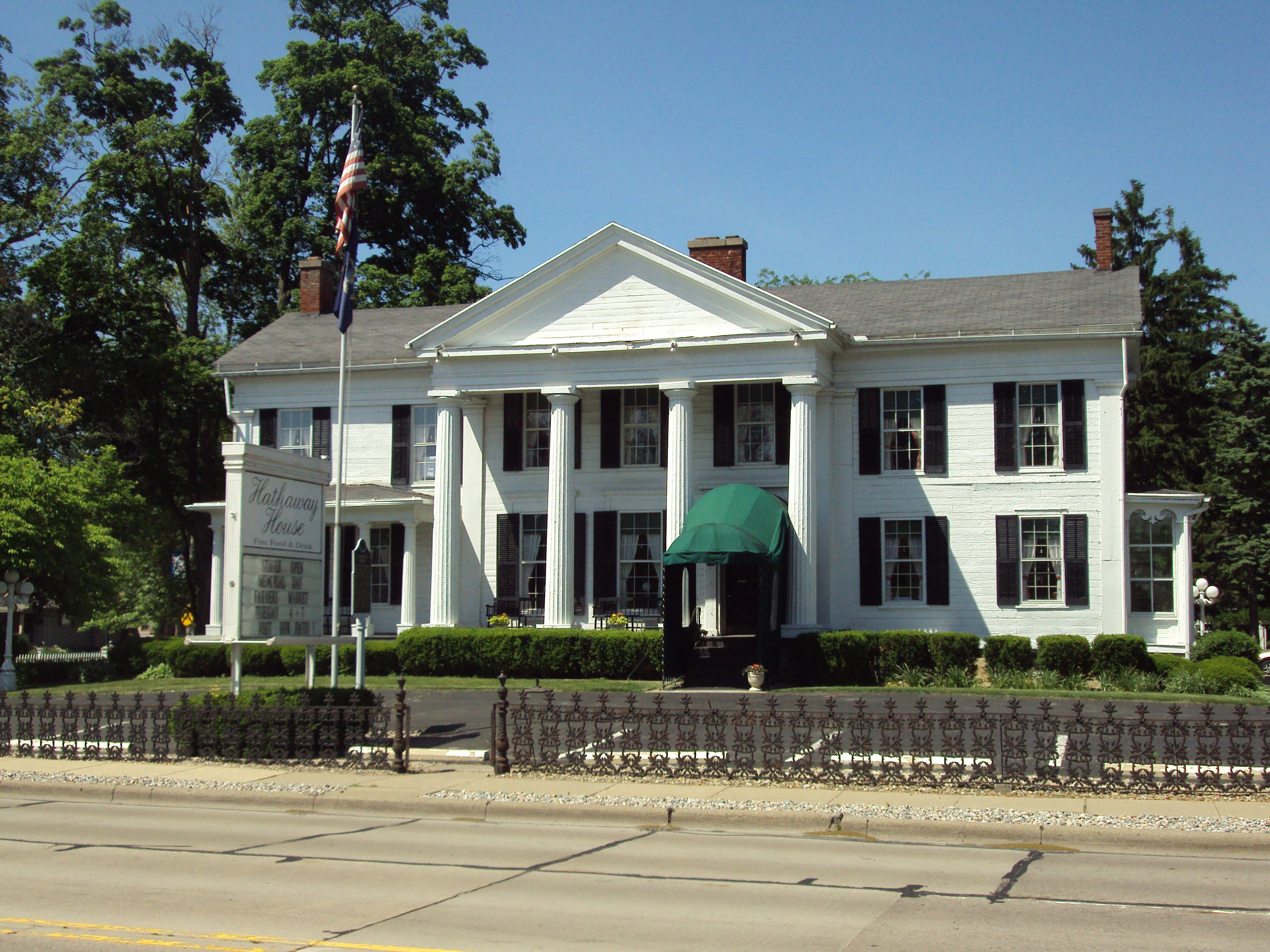

- Location within Michigan Location within the United States
- Interactive map
- Location: 424 West Adrian Street; Blissfield, Michigan
- Coordinates: 41°50′08″N 83°52′18″W
- Built: c. 1851
- Architectural style: Greek Revival
- NRHP reference No.: 79001163

Significant dates
- Added to NRHP: November 20, 1979
- Designated MSHS: August 13, 1971

The David Carpenter House is a former residence currently operating as a restaurant called the Hathaway House. It is located at 424 West Adrian Street (U.S. Route 223) in the village of Blissfield in Blissfield Township, Michigan. It was designated as a Michigan State Historic Site on August 13, 1971, and also later listed on the National Register of Historic Places on November 20, 1979.

Built in approximately 1851, it is a rather large Greek Revival house built by New York native and merchant David Carpenter, who was one of Lenawee County's most prominent residents when he moved to the area in 1838. The house originally contained 18 rooms, which included a card room, several parlors, dining room, library, three kitchens, and five bedrooms. Several walls were removed at later dates to create larger rooms. Minor additions, such as the addition of a second story to the side wings, were added soon after its construction.

Carpenter lived in the house from 1851 until his death in 1891. After his death, the house passed to other members of his family, and it was sold to the Hathaway family at the turn of the century. It remained a private residence until 1960 when it was converted into the Hathaway House restaurant by the Weeber family. In 1995, the most recent addition included a back parlor and new back porch. Today, the structure includes three dining rooms and two parlors on the main floor and three dining rooms and a ballroom on the second floor. The structure has retained most of its exterior details since it was first constructed.
