= Christian Albert =

Christian Albert may refer to:

- Christian Albert (Medal of Honor) (1842–1922), American soldier who received the Medal of Honor during the American Civil War
- Christian Albert, Margrave of Brandenburg-Ansbach (1675–1692), German nobleman
- Christian Albert, Duke of Holstein-Gottorp (1641–1695), duke of Holstein-Gottorp and bishop of Lübeck
