= John Hack =

John Hack may refer to:

- John Hack (Medal of Honor) (1842–1933), soldier in the Union Army in the American Civil War
- John Hack (speedway rider) (born 1959), British motorcycle speedway rider
- John Tilton Hack (1913–1991), American geologist
- John Barton Hack (1805–1884), early settler in South Australia
