= Betz Airport =

Airport in Michigan, United States

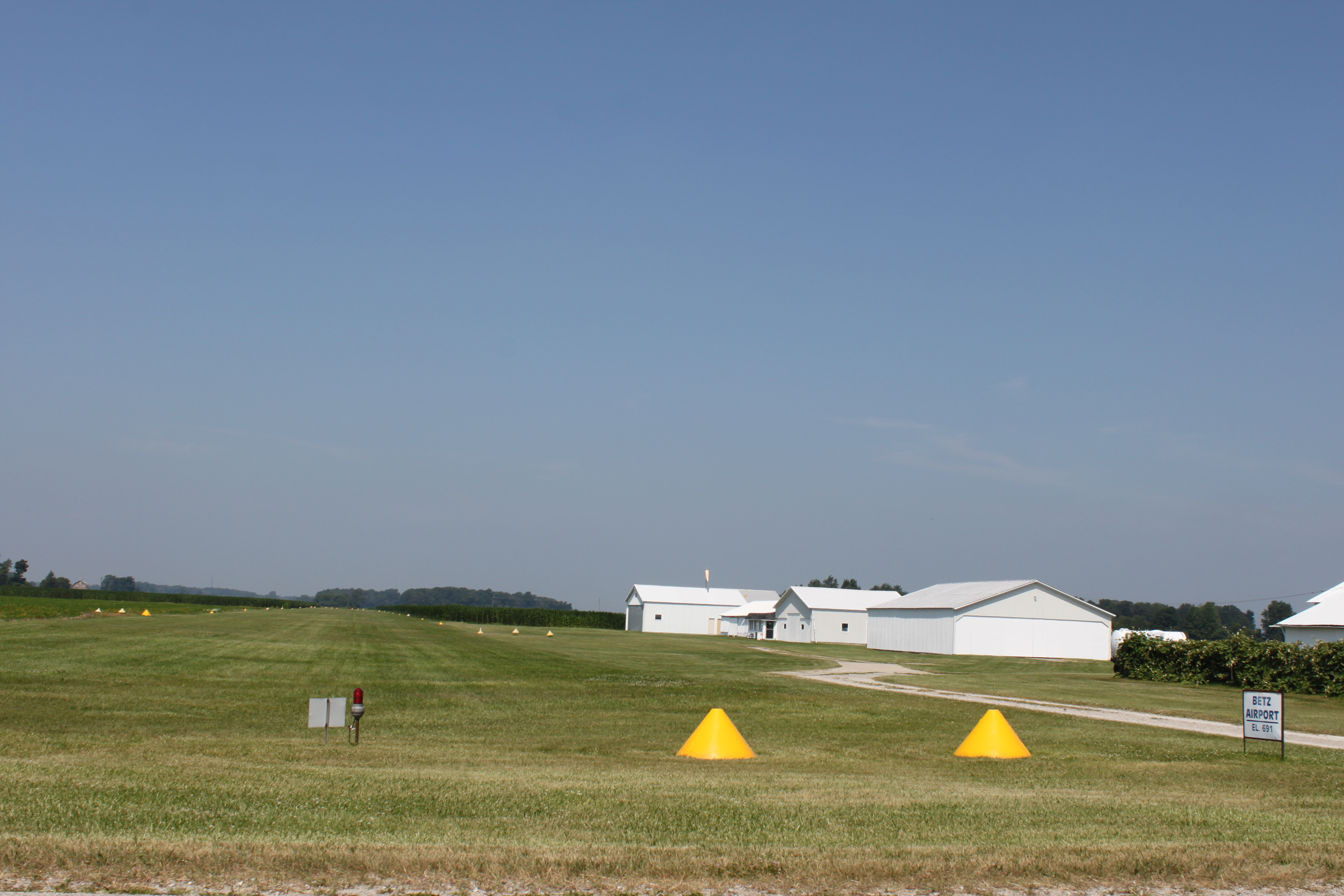
- IATA: none; ICAO: none; FAA LID: 44G

Summary
- Airport type: Public
- Owner: Diane Spillman
- Operator: Diane Spillman, Manager
- Serves: Blissfield, Michigan
- Elevation AMSL: 691 ft / 211 m
- Coordinates: 41°51′20.17″N 83°52′14.78″W
- Interactive map of Betz Airport

Runways
Direction	Length		Surface
Direction	ft	m	Surface
9/27	2,602	793	Turf

Statistics (2021)
- Aircraft Movement: 696
- Based Aircraft: 9

Betz Airport (FAA LID: 44G) is a privately owned, public-use airport located two miles north of Blissfield, Michigan, United States, in Blissfield Township. It is at an elevation of 691 feet.

The airport has one runway, designated 9/27. It measures 2,602 x 92 ft (793 x 28 m) and has a turf surface.

No fuel is available at the airport.

For the 12-month period ending December 31, 2021, the airport had 696 aircraft operations, an average of 58 per month. This was composed entirely of general aviation. There are 9 aircraft based on the airport, all single-engine airplanes.

== See also ==
- List of airports in Michigan
