= Blissfield Downtown Historic District =

Historic district in Michigan, United States

- U.S. National Register of Historic Places
- U.S. Historic district
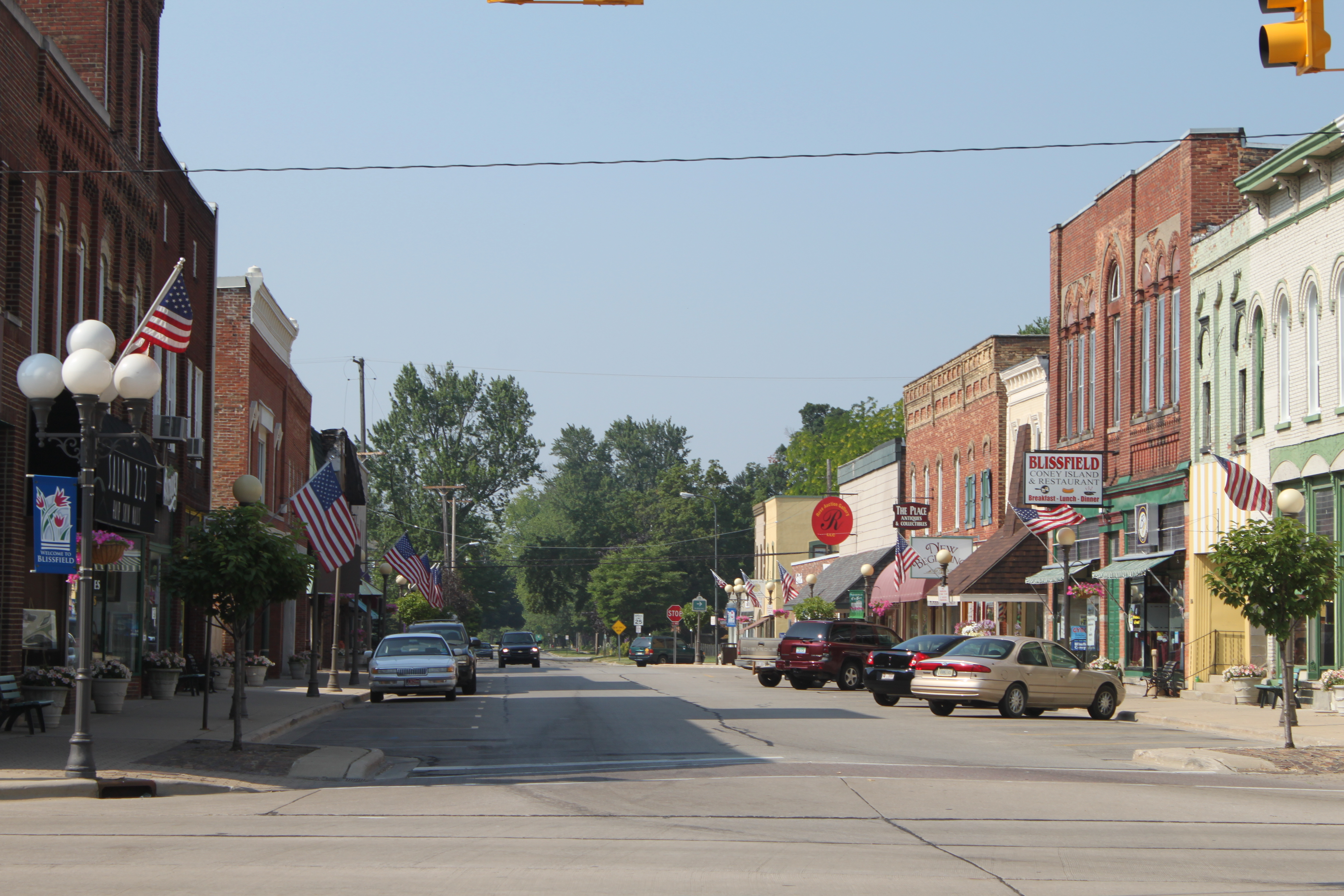

- Location within Michigan Location within the United States
- Interactive map
- Location: Roughly bounded by Pearl, Jefferson, Giles and Adrian Sts., and the Blissfield railroad line, Blissfield, Michigan
- Coordinates: 41°49′55″N 83°51′46″W
- Architect: James Saunders; Mills, Rhines, Bellman, and Nordhoff
- Architectural style: Italianate, Classical Revival
- NRHP reference No.: 15000364
- Added to NRHP: June 29, 2015

The Blissfield Downtown Historic District is a historic district located in the village of Blissfield, Michigan, and roughly bounded by Pearl Street on the west, Giles Avenue on the east, Jefferson Street on the south, and Adrian Street and the Blissfield railroad line on the north. The district was added to the National Register of Historic Places in 2015.

The Blissfield Downtown Historic District contains 44 historically contributing structures, and eight non-contributing. The district is bisected by the River Raisin, with buildings on each side. The structures date back to 1875, with much of the development occurring in the late 19th and early 20th centuries. The district contains the bulk of the structures used in Blissfield's commercial activities during that time, as well as prominent business and professional offices, entertainment venues, fraternal organizations, and other recreational structures. The buildings are primarily brick structures of one to three stories in height, set close to each other and the sidewalk. The buildings in the district representing the prevailing styles in commercial architecture during the period in which they were built, including Italianate, Late Victorian, Arts and Crafts and Commercial Brick structures, several of which are outstanding and well-preserved examples of these styles.

== History ==
Blissfield was originally settled in 1825, and brew slowly over the next few decades. The arrival of the Erie and Kalamazoo Railroad in the late 1830s spurred some development, but it was not until the 1860s and 1870s, when surrounding landowners began an extensive program of land clearing, that the settlement enlarged substantially. Blissfield incorporated as a village in 1875, and the same year a disastrous fire swept through the commercial district, destroying nearly all the buildings. The earliest buildings in the current district date to the rebuilding after the fire. In 1884, the village mandated that all new buildings in the business district be fireproof.

The downtown continued to grow through the end of the 19th century and into the beginning of the 20th. Farther into the 20th century, the village's economy transitioned from agricultural to industrial. After World War II. there was a building boom, but as with many small towns, the 1950s and 60s saw a slow decline in the commercial district as businesses closed or moved elsewhere. However, the Blissfield business district reinvented itself, transitioning to antique stores, gift shops, craft centers, and other specialty shops which attracted an out-of-town clientele. This business model continued into the 21st century.
