= 12th Kentucky Infantry Regiment =

- Active: September 26, 1861, to July 11, 1865
- Country: United States
- Allegiance: Union
- Branch: Infantry
- Engagements: Battle of Mill Springs; Siege of Corinth; Battle of Perryville; Battle of Stones River; Knoxville Campaign; Battle of Kennesaw Mountain; Siege of Atlanta; Battle of Jonesboro; Battle of Lovejoy's Station; Battle of Franklin; Battle of Nashville; Carolinas campaign

The 12th Kentucky Infantry Regiment was an infantry regiment that served in the Union Army during the American Civil War.

== Service ==
Company A of the 12th Kentucky Infantry Regiment was organized at Camp Dick Robinson on September 26, 1861, while the remaining nine companies were organized near Waitsboro, Kentucky, from December 1861 through January 1862 and mustered at Clio, Kentucky, in January 1862 for a three-year enlistment.

The regiment was attached to Thomas' Command, Camp Dick Robinson, Kentucky, to November 1861. 1st Brigade, Army of the Ohio, to December 1861. 1st Brigade, 1st Division, Army of the Ohio, to September 1862. 1st Brigade, 1st Division, III Corps, Army of the Ohio, to November 1862. 1st Brigade, 3rd Division, Center, XIV Corps, Army of the Cumberland, to December 1862. District of Western Kentucky, Department of the Ohio, to June 1863. 1st Brigade, 2nd Division, XXIII Corps, Army of the Ohio, to August 1863. 1st Brigade, 3rd Division, XXIII Corps, to June 1864. 3rd Brigade, 3rd Division, XXIII Corps, to August 1864. 1st Brigade, 3rd Division, XXIII Corps, Army of the Ohio, to February 1865, and Department of North Carolina to July 1865.

The 12th Kentucky Infantry mustered out of service on July 11, 1865.

== Detailed service ==
Actions at Albany and Travisville, Ky., September 29, 1861 (Company A). Operations in Wayne and Clinton Counties and at Mill Springs, Ky., November 1861. At Camp Hoskins until December. Operations about Mill Springs December 1–13. Action with Zollicoffer December 2. Moved to Somerset and duty there until January 1862. Battle of Mill Springs January 19–20. Regiment mustered in at Clio, Ky., January 1862. Moved to Louisville, Ky.; thence to Nashville, Tenn., February 11-March 2. March to Savannah, Tenn., March 20-April 8. Advance on and Siege of Corinth, Miss., April 29-May 30. Pursuit to Booneville June 1–6. Buell's Campaign in northern Alabama and middle Tennessee June to August. March to Nashville, Tenn.; thence to Louisville, Ky., in pursuit of Bragg, August 20-September 25. Pursuit of Bragg into Kentucky October 1–15. Battle of Perryville, Ky., October 8 (reserve). March to Lebanon, Ky., and duty there until April 1863. Operations against Morgan December 22, 1862, to January 2, 1863. Moved to Bowling Green, Ky., April 10. Duty there and at Russellville until August. Moved to Camp Nelson and Danville and Join Gen. Burnside. Burnside's march over Cumberland Mountains and Campaign in eastern Tennessee August 16-October 17. Occupation of Knoxville September 3. Watauga River, Blue Springs, October 10. Knoxville Campaign November 4-December 23. Siege of Knoxville November 17-December 5. Blain's Cross Roads December 15–16. At Strawberry Plains until January 1864. Regiment veteranized and moved to Louisville, Ky. Veterans on furlough until April 1. At Burnside's Point until May. March to Chattanooga, thence to Burnt Hickory, Ga., May 1–24. Burnt Hickory May 25. Battles about Dallas, New Hope Church and Allatoona Hills May 25-June 5. Raccoon Bottom June 2. Operations about Marietta and against Kennesaw Mountain June 10-July 2. Burnt Hickory June 13. Lost Mountain June 15–17. Muddy Creek June 17. Noyes Creek June 19. Cheyney's Farm June 22. Near Marietta June 23. Olley's Farm June 26–27. Assault on Kennesaw June 27. Nickajack Creek July 2–5. Chattahoochie River July 6–17. Peachtree Creek July 19–20. Siege of Atlanta July 22-August 25. Utoy Creek August 5–7. Flank movement on Jonesboro August 25–30. Battle of Jonesboro August 31-September 1. Lovejoy's Station September 2–6. Operations against Hood in northern Georgia and northern Alabama September 29-November 3. Cedar Bluff, Ala., October 27. Moved to Nashville, thence to Pulaski. Nashville Campaign November–December. Columbia, Duck River, November 24–27. Columbia Ford November 29. Battle of Franklin November 30. Battle of Nashville December 15–16. Pursuit of Hood to the Tennessee River December 17–28. At Clifton, Tenn., until January 16. Moved to Washington, D.C.; thence to Federal Point, N. C., January 16-February 9. Operations against Hoke February 12–14. Fort Anderson February 18–19. Town Creek February 19–20. Capture of Wilmington February 22. Campaign of the Carolinas March 1-April 26. Advance on Goldsboro March 6–21. Occupation of Goldsboro March 21. Advance on Raleigh April 10–13. Occupation of Raleigh April 14. Bennett's House April 26. Surrender of Johnston and his army. Duty at Greensboro, N. C., until July.

== Casualties ==
The regiment lost a total of 239 men during service; 1 officer and 40 enlisted men killed or mortally wounded, 5 officers and 193 enlisted men died of disease.

== Commanders ==
- Colonel William A. Hoskins
- Lieutenant Colonel Laurence H. Rousseau - commanded at the battle of Nashville

== Notable members ==
- Captain John Harties Brown, Company D - Medal of Honor recipient for action at the Battle of Franklin, November 30, 1864
- Corporal Oliver Hughes, Company C - Medal of Honor recipient for capture of the flag of 11th South Carolina Infantry, June 24, 1864

== See also ==
- List of Kentucky Civil War Units
- Kentucky in the Civil War
