= Henry H. Nash =

American corporal in the Union Army

- Born: Henry Hart Nash; March 4, 1842; Lenawee County, Michigan, U.S.
- Died: March 30, 1917 (aged 75) Palmyra, Michigan, U.S.
- Branch: Union Army
- Rank: Corporal
- Conflicts: American Civil War
- Awards: Medal of Honor

Henry Hart Nash (March 4, 1842 – March 30, 1917) was an American corporal in the Union Army. He received the Medal of Honor in 1909, for his actions on May 3, 1863 in the Siege of Vicksburg during the American Civil War.

Nash died in Palmyra, Michigan on March 30, 1917, at the age of 75. He was buried at Palmyra Cemetery.
