= Blissfield Township, Michigan =

- Civil township
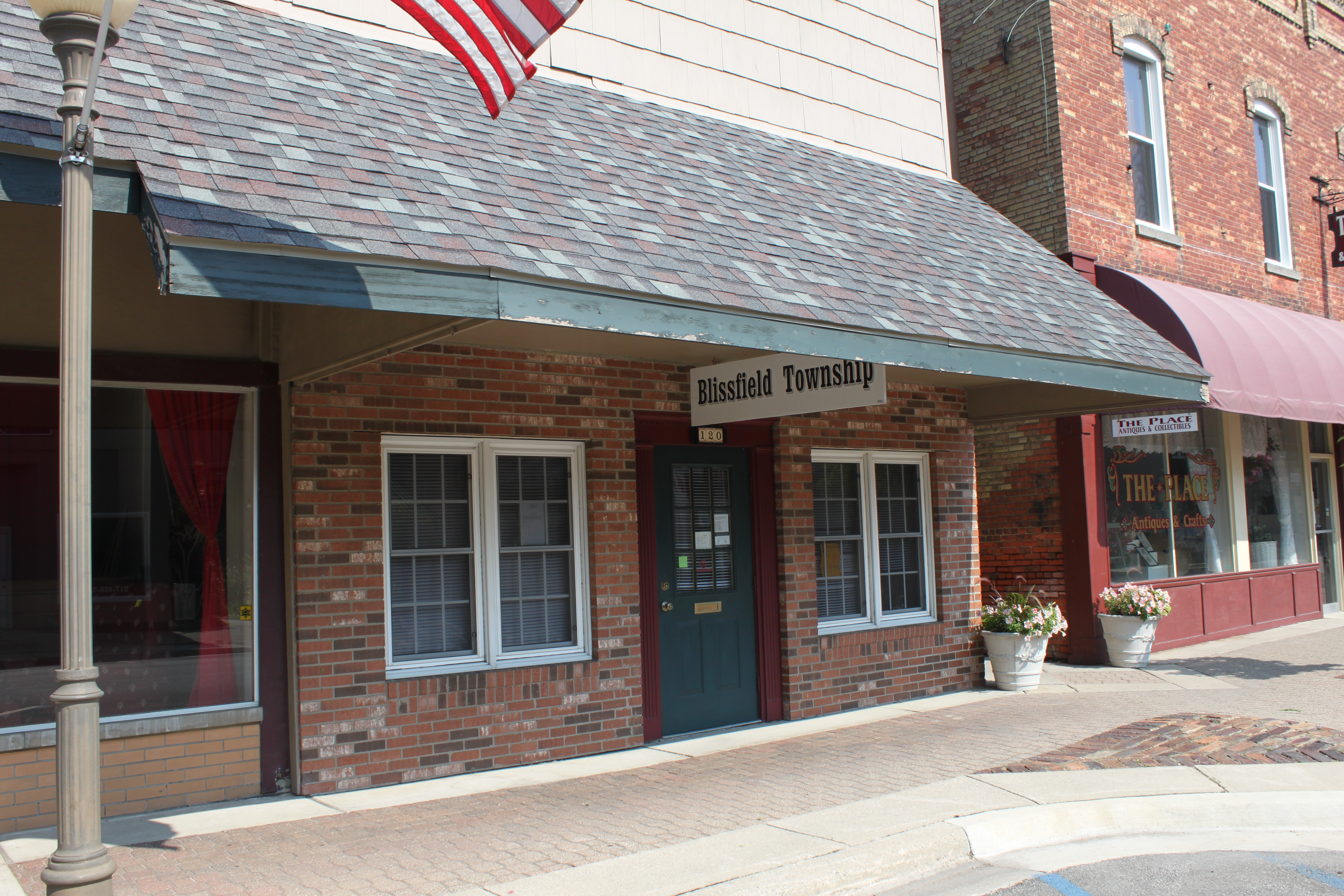
- Township Hall in the village of Blissfield

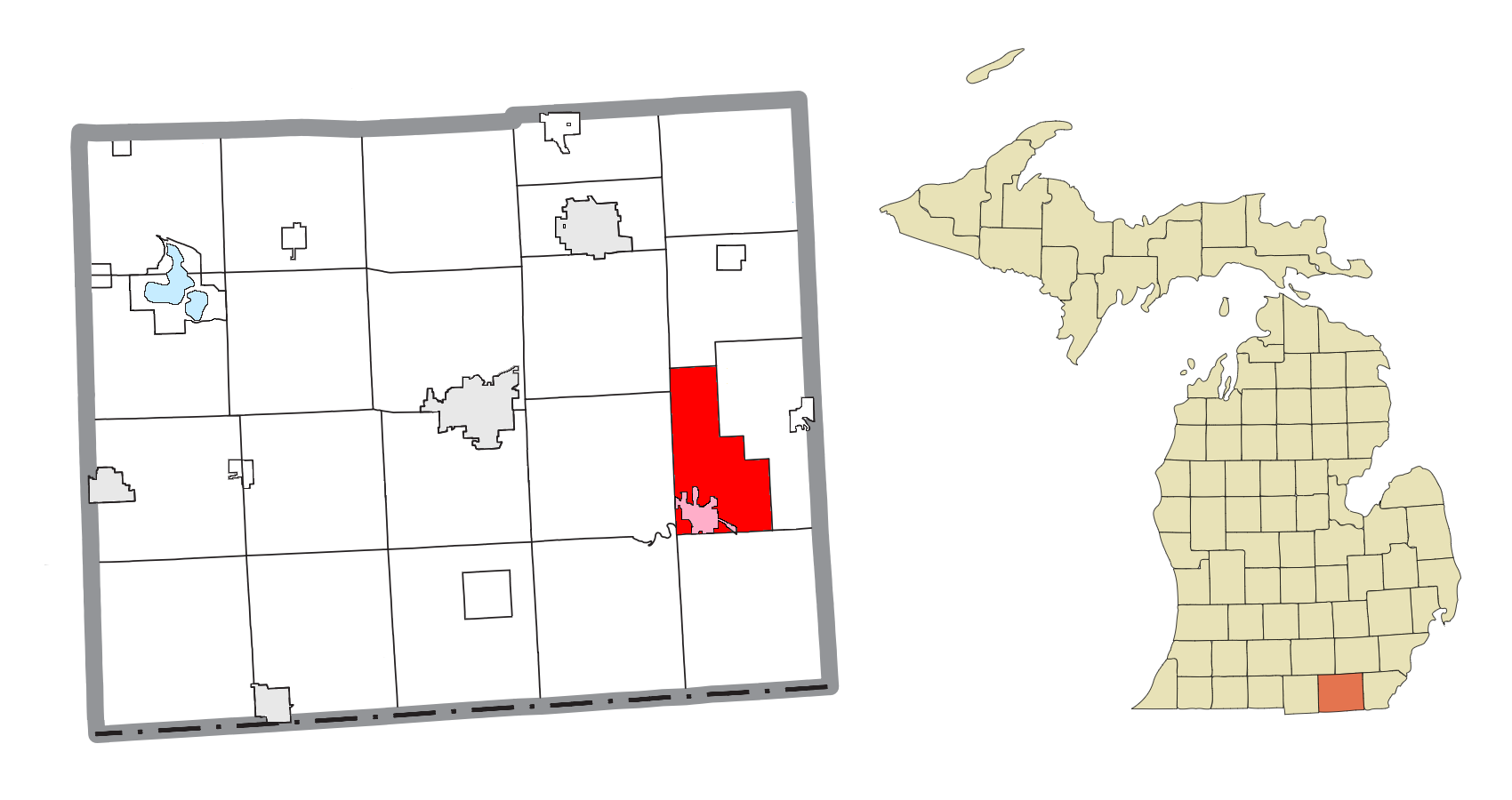
- Location within Lenawee County (red) and the administered village of Blissfield (pink)

- Location within the state of Michigan Location within the United States
- Coordinates: 41°50′28″N 83°51′40″W
- Country: United States
- State: Michigan
- County: Lenawee
- Established: 1827

Government
  - Supervisor: Alan Dickerson
  - Clerk: Diann Pail-Warner

Area
  - Total: 21.1 sq mi (54.6 km^{2})
  - Land: 21.0 sq mi (54.5 km^{2})
  - Water: 0.039 sq mi (0.1 km^{2})
- Elevation: 682 ft (208 m)

Population (2020)
  - Total: 3,924
  - Density: 186/sq mi (72.0/km^{2})
- Time zone: UTC-5 (Eastern (EST))
  - Summer (DST): UTC-4 (EDT)
- ZIP code(s): 49228 (Blissfield); 49238 (Deerfield); 49268 (Palmyra)
- Area code: 517
- FIPS code: 26-09020
- GNIS feature ID: 1625948
- Website: Official website

Blissfield Township is a civil township of Lenawee County in the U.S. state of Michigan. As of the 2020 census, the township population was 3,924. The township was organized in 1827.

The village of Blissfield is located within the township.

== Geography ==
According to the United States Census Bureau, the township has a total area of 21.1 square miles (55 km^{2}), of which 21.1 square miles (55 km^{2}) is land and 0.04 square miles (0.10 km^{2}) (0.09%) is water.

== Demographics ==
As of the census of 2000, there were 3,915 people, 1,573 households, and 1,105 families residing in the township. The population density was 185.9 inhabitants per square mile (71.8/km^{2}). There were 1,657 housing units at an average density of 78.7 per square mile (30.4/km^{2}). The racial makeup of the township was 96.65% White, 0.05% African American, 0.03% Native American, 0.08% Asian, 2.50% from other races, and 0.69% from two or more races. Hispanic or Latino of any race were 5.98% of the population.

There were 1,573 households, out of which 33.4% had children under the age of 18 living with them, 58.4% were married couples living together, 8.9% had a female householder with no husband present, and 29.7% were non-families. 26.1% of all households were made up of individuals, and 14.7% had someone living alone who was 65 years of age or older. The average household size was 2.46 and the average family size was 2.97.

In the township the population was spread out, with 26.6% under the age of 18, 7.4% from 18 to 24, 28.2% from 25 to 44, 22.2% from 45 to 64, and 15.6% who were 65 years of age or older. The median age was 37 years. For every 100 females, there were 91.8 males. For every 100 females age 18 and over, there were 87.9 males.

The median income for a household in the township was $40,306, and the median income for a family was $50,978. Males had a median income of $37,109 versus $24,474 for females. The per capita income for the township was $19,406. About 5.6% of families and 7.7% of the population were below the poverty line, including 8.1% of those under age 18 and 10.0% of those age 65 or over.

== Gallery ==
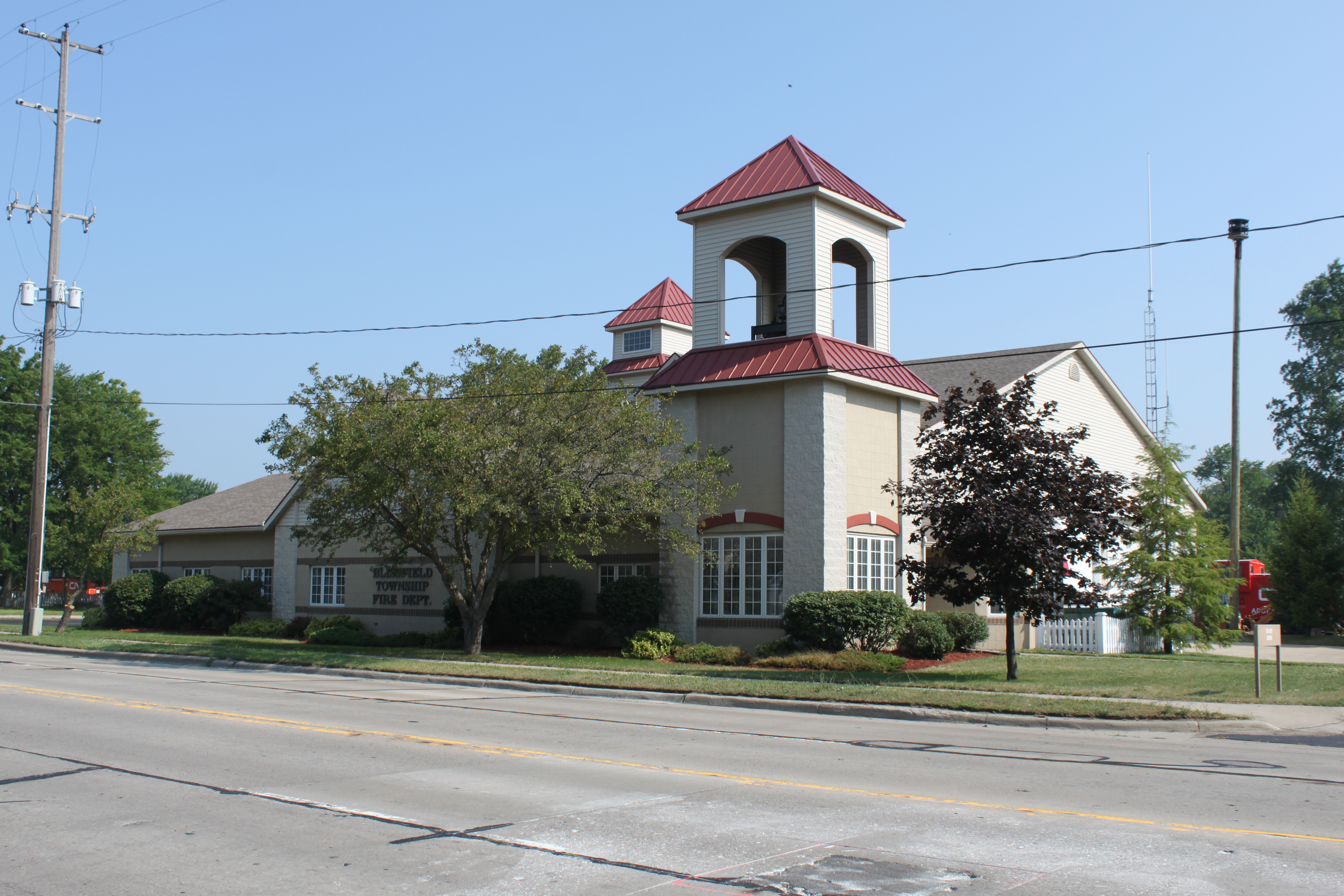
Township Fire Dept, Adrian St., Blissfield Village

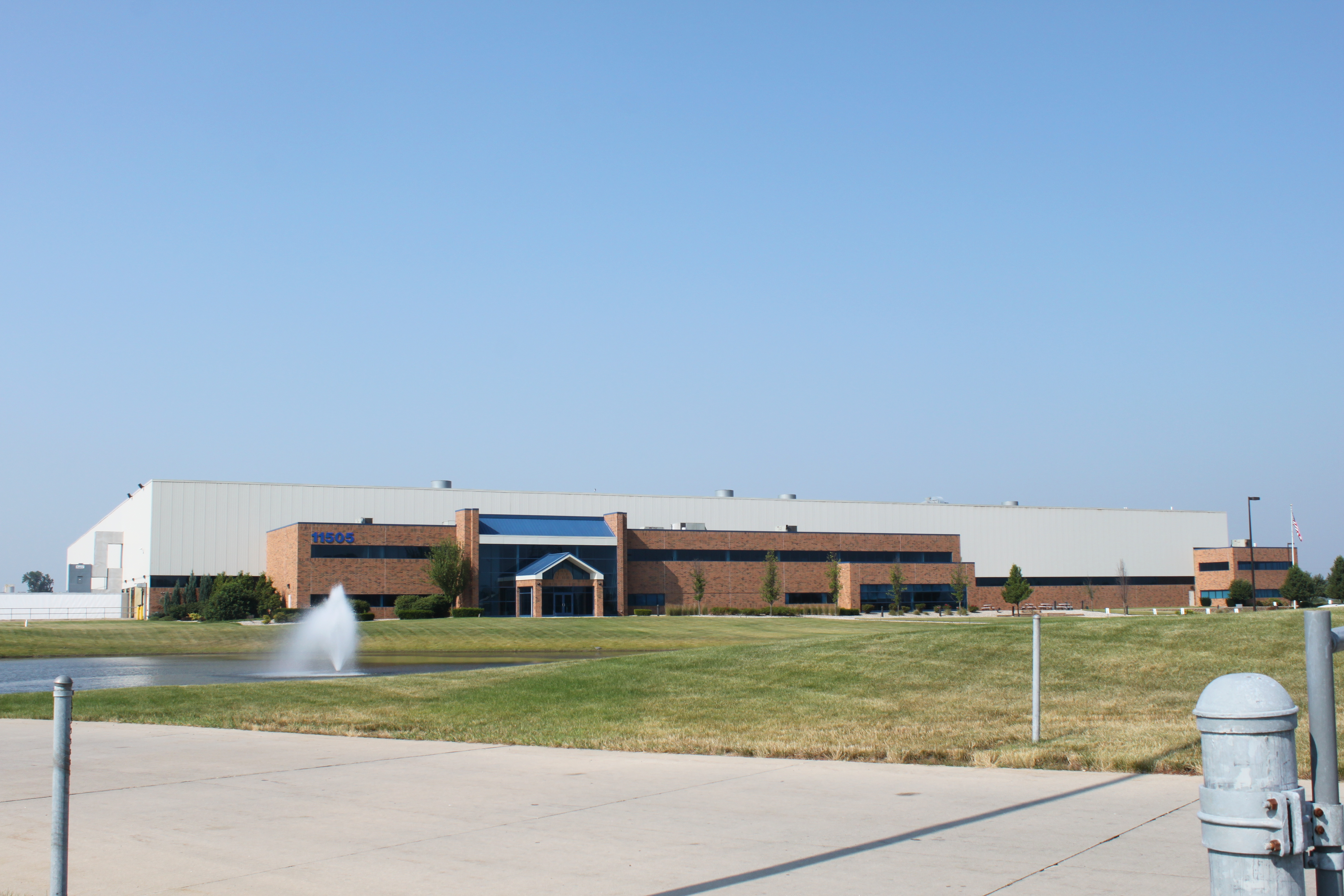
L & W Engineering plant 4, U.S. 223

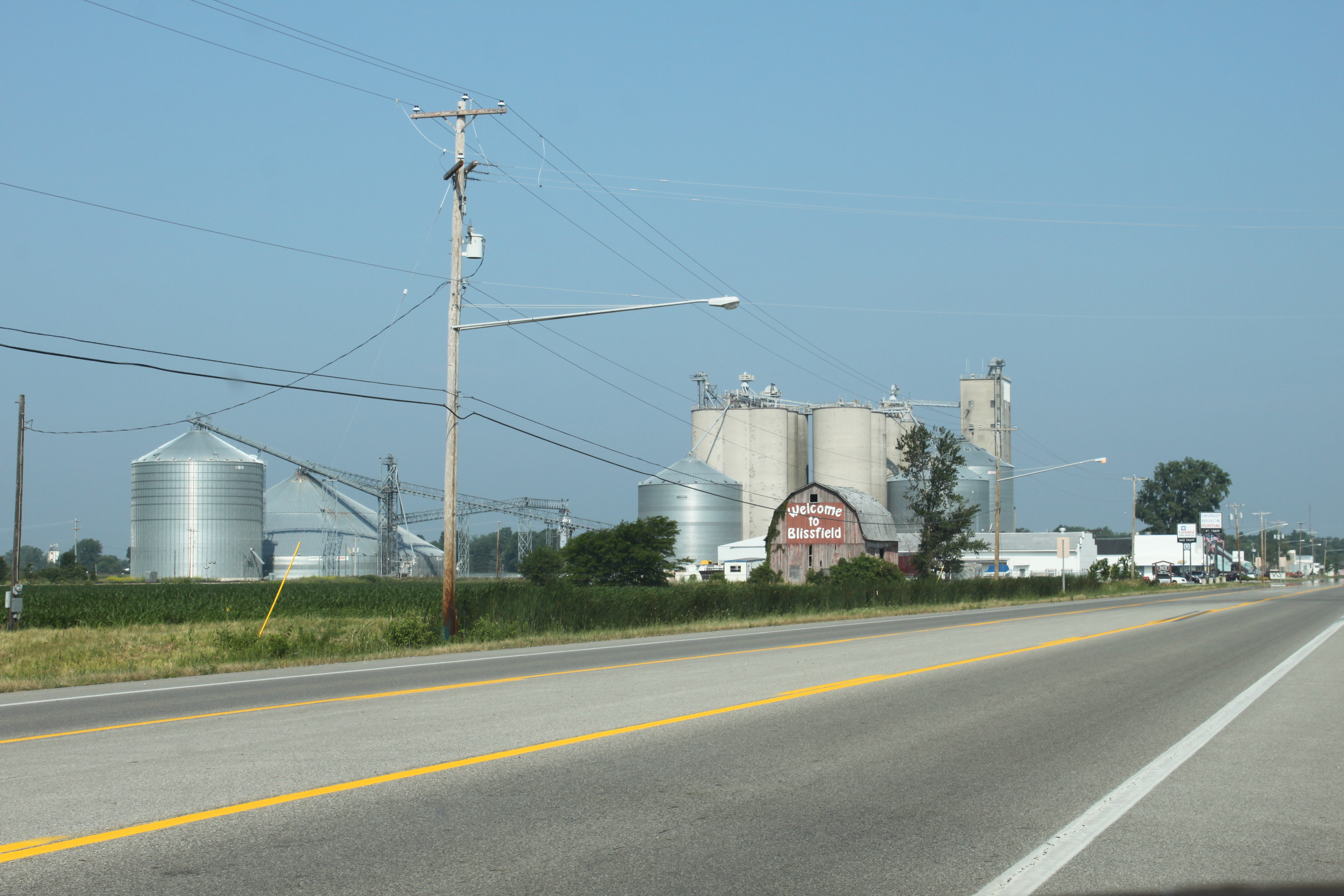
Grain elevators, U.S. 223

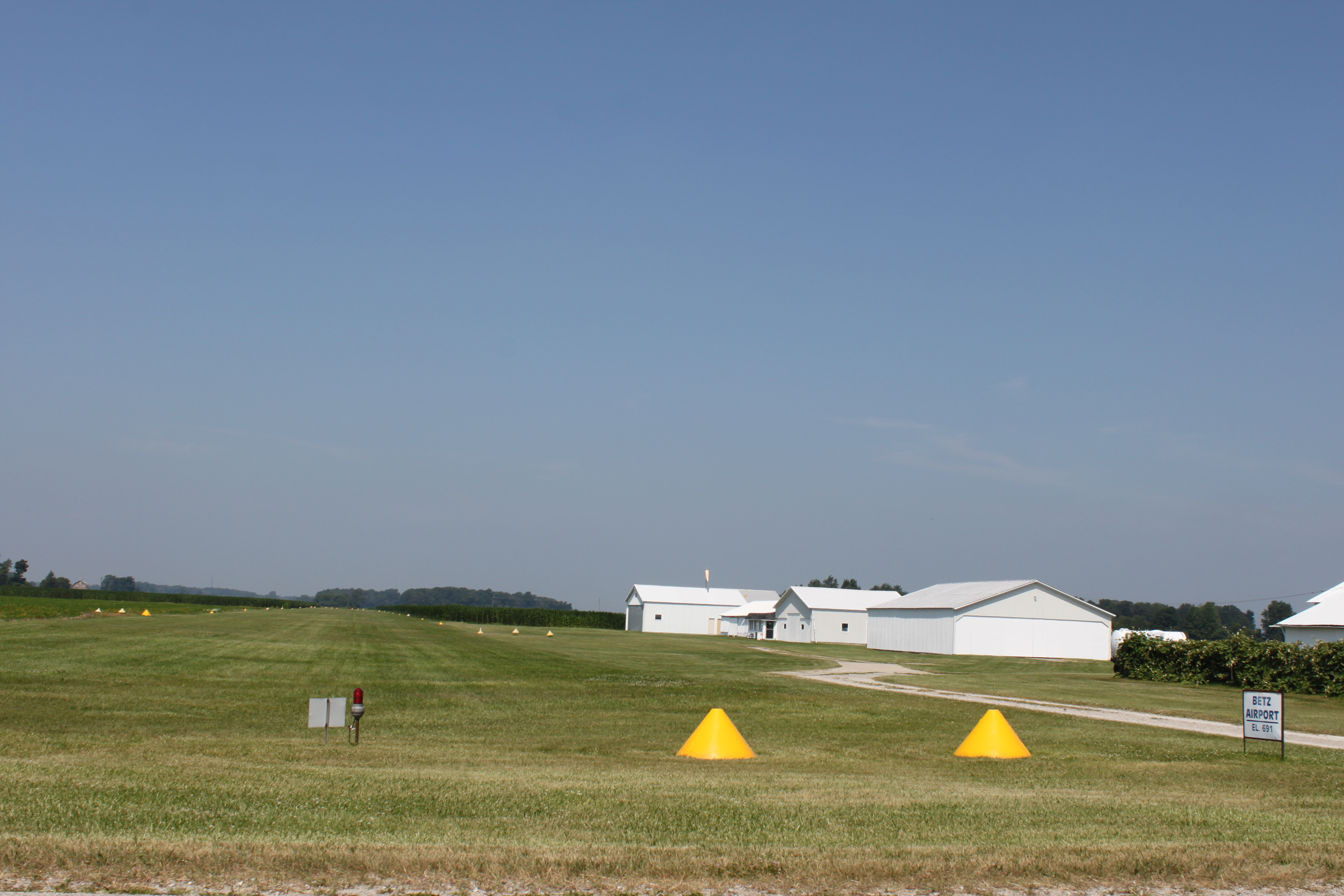
Betz Airport, Blissfield Hwy.
