= Henry Lewis (Medal of Honor) =

- Born: December 14, 1844; Belleville, Michigan, US
- Died: March 29, 1930 (aged 85); Michigan, US
- Burial place: Van Buren Charter Township, Michigan
- Military career
- Allegiance: United States of America; Union
- Branch: United States Army; Union Army
- Rank: First Sergeant
- Units: Company B, 47th Ohio Infantry
- Conflicts: American Civil War
- Awards: Medal of Honor

Henry Lewis (December 14, 1844 – March 29, 1930) was a soldier in the Union Army and a Medal of Honor recipient for his actions in the American Civil War.

== Medal of Honor citation ==
Rank and organization: Corporal, Company B, 47th Ohio Infantry. Place and date: At Vicksburg, Miss., May 3, 1863. Entered service at: Adrian, Mich. Born: December 14, 1842, Van Buren Township, Wayne County, Mich. Date of issue: April 17, 1917.

Citation:

Was one of a party that volunteered and attempted to run the enemy's batteries with a steam tug and two barges loaded with subsistence stores.

== See also ==
- List of American Civil War Medal of Honor recipients: G–L
