= Peter Sype =

American Civil War Medal of Honor recipient (1841–1923)

Private Johann Peter Sype
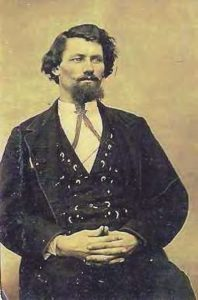
- Sype in 1804
- Born: 11 October 1841; Monroe County, Michigan
- Died: 20 April 1923 (aged 81); Newport, Michigan
- Military career
- Allegiance: United States (Union)
- Branch: Army
- Service years: 1861-1864
- Rank: Private
- Units: Company B, 47th Ohio Infantry
- Conflicts: Siege of Vicksburg
- Awards: Medal of Honor

Johann Peter Sype (also known as Peter Sype, 11 October 1841 - 20 April 1923) was a private in the United States Army who was awarded the Medal of Honor for gallantry during the American Civil War. He was awarded the medal on 2 September 1911 for actions he performed at the Battle of Vicksburg in 1863.

== Personal life ==
Sype was born in Monroe County, Michigan, in October 1841 to parents Christian and Maria Elizabeth Seip. He married Marie Louisa Doederlein in 1870 and fathered 10 children. He died on 20 April 1923 in Newport, Michigan, and was buried in Trinity Lutheran Cemetery in Monroe.

== Military service ==
On 15 June 1861, Sype enlisted as a private in Adrian, Michigan. As Michigan had filled its recruitment quotas, he was reassigned to Company B of the 47th Ohio Infantry. During the Siege of Vicksburg, on the night of 3 May 1863, Sype volunteered to guard a shipment of goods that was attempting to make its way past the Confederate blockade of the town. After the steamboat he was on was shelled and sunk, he was captured as a Confederate prisoner of war. He was later wounded near Kennesaw Mountain, Georgia, in June 1864.

Sype's Medal of Honor citation reads:

The President of the United States of America, in the name of Congress, takes pleasure in presenting the Medal of Honor to Private Peter Sype, United States Army, for extraordinary heroism on 3 May 1863, while serving with Company B, 47th Ohio Infantry, in action at Vicksburg, Mississippi. Private Sype was one of a party that volunteered and attempted to run the enemy's batteries with a steam tug and two barges loaded with subsistence stores.

— H. L. Stimson, Secretary of War

Sype was mustered out of service on 10 September 1864 in Atlanta, Georgia. His Medal of Honor is attributed to Michigan.
