= Frederick Ballen =

German soldier who received the Medal of Honor

Frederick A. Ballen
- Born: August 11, 1843; Germany
- Died: April 27, 1916 (aged 72)
- Burial place: Carleton, Michigan
- Military career
- Allegiance: United States of America
- Branch: United States Army; Union Army
- Rank: Private
- Unit: 47th Regiment Ohio Volunteer Infantry
- Awards: Medal of Honor

Frederick A. Ballen (August 11, 1843 – April 27, 1916) was a German soldier who received the Medal of Honor for valor during the American Civil War.

== Biography ==
Archer served in the American Civil War in the 47th Ohio Infantry for the Union Army. He received the Medal of Honor on November 6, 1908 for his actions at Vicksburg, Mississippi.

== Medal of Honor citation ==
Citation:

Was one of a party that volunteered and attempted to run the enemy's batteries with a steam tug and 2 barges loaded with subsistence stores.

== See also ==
- List of American Civil War Medal of Honor recipients: A-F
