= Andrew Davidson (Army surgeon) =

American Civil War Medal of Honor recipient

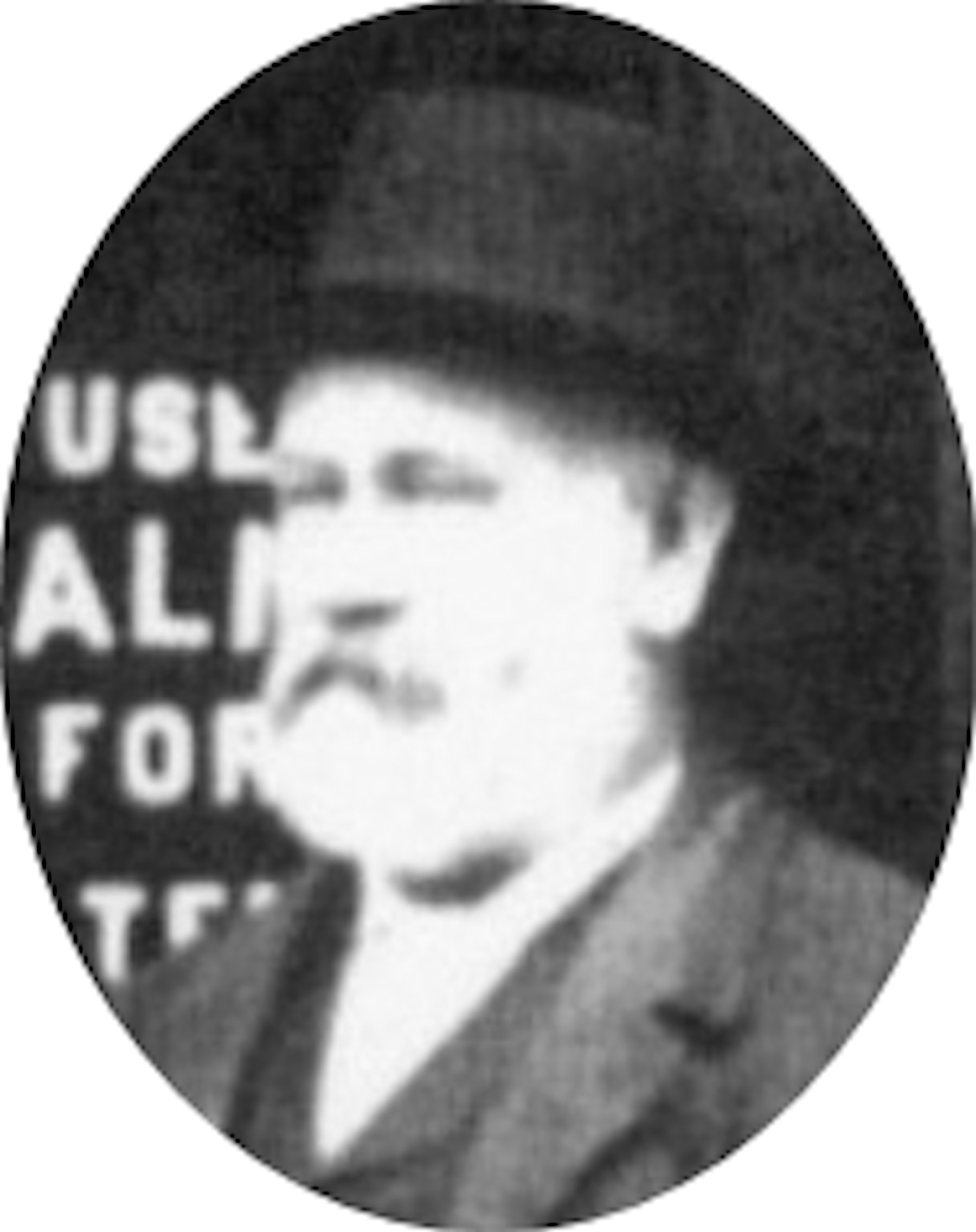
- Davidson in 1895
- Born: July 1, 1819; Middlebury, Vermont
- Died: June 30, 1901 (aged 81); Lancaster, Ohio
- Burial place: Forest Rose Cemetery
- Military career
- Allegiance: United States of America
- Branch: United States Army
- Service years: 1863
- Rank: Assistant Surgeon
- Unit: 47th Ohio Volunteer Infantry
- Conflicts: Battle of Vicksburg
- Awards: Medal of Honor

Assistant Surgeon Andrew Davidson (July 1, 1819 – June 30, 1901) was an American soldier who fought in the American Civil War. Davidson received the country's highest award for bravery during combat, the Medal of Honor, for his action during the Battle of Vicksburg in Mississippi on 3 May 1863. He was honored with the award on 17 October 1892.

== Biography ==
Davidson was born in Middlebury, Vermont, on 1 July 1819. He enlisted into the 47th Ohio Infantry. He died on 30 June 1901 and his remains are interred at the Forest Rose Cemetery in Ohio.

== Medal of Honor citation ==
Voluntarily attempted to run the enemy's batteries.

== See also ==
- List of American Civil War Medal of Honor recipients: A–F
