= Oliver Hughes =

American Civil War Medal of Honor recipient

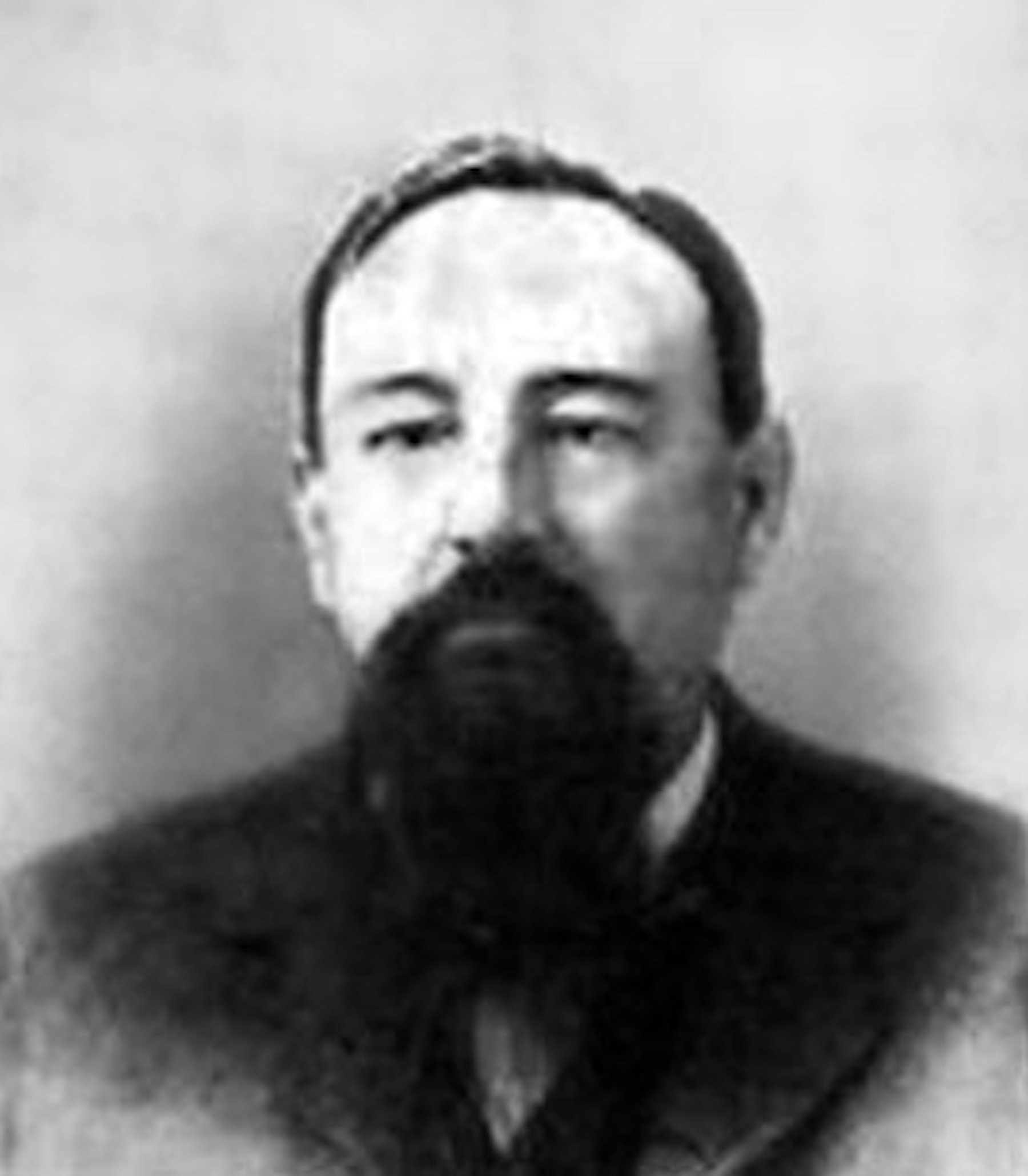
- Hughes in c. 1899
- Born: January 21, 1842; Fentress County, Tennessee
- Died: January 5, 1911 (aged 68); Macon, Missouri
- Burial place: Callao, Missouri
- Military career
- Branch: Union Army
- Rank: Corporal
- Units: Company C, 12th Kentucky Volunteer Infantry Regiment
- Conflicts: American Civil War
- Awards: Medal of Honor

Cpl. Oliver Hughes (January 21, 1844 – January 5, 1911) of the Union Army's 12th Kentucky Infantry was awarded the Medal of Honor for action, which culminated in his 20 February 1865 capture of the Confederate States Army's 11th South Carolina's flag.

== See also ==
- List of American Civil War Medal of Honor recipients: G–L § H
