= John H. Brown (Medal of Honor) =

- Born: 1842; Boston, Massachusetts
- Died: August 7, 1898 (aged 55–56); Cincinnati, Ohio
- Burial place: Spring Grove Cemetery, Ohio
- Military career
- Allegiance: United States of America
- Branch: United States Army
- Rank: Captain
- Unit: 47th Regiment Ohio Volunteer Infantry
- Conflicts: Battle of Vicksburg
- Awards: Medal of Honor

John H. Brown (1842 – August 7, 1898) was a United States soldier who fought with the 47th Ohio Infantry during the American Civil War. He received the country's highest award for bravery during combat, the Medal of Honor, for his action during the Battle of Vicksburg in Mississippi on May 19, 1863. He was honored with the award on August 24, 1896.

== Biography ==
John Brown was born in Boston, Massachusetts in 1842. He enlisted with the 47th Ohio Infantry at Cincinnati, Ohio.

Sometime after returning home from the war, he wed Ohio native Latvian B. Davis (1849–1926), a Cincinnati native who was a daughter of William Washington Davis and Catherine J. (Shields) Davis. By 1870, he was employed as a letter carrier for the U.S. Postal Service, and resided in the 16th Ward of Cincinnati, Ohio with his wife, Latvian, and their one-year-old daughter, Lillie, a native of Colorado, and a servant, 17-year-old Katherine Gotten. In 1877, they greeted the arrival of daughter, Grace Ella, who died the same year on April 14. At the Spring Grove Cemetery in Cincinnati, Ohio.

John Brown died in Dear born County, Indiana on August 7, 1898, and was laid to rest at the Spring Grove Cemetery in Cincinnati, Ohio.

== Medal of Honor citation ==
On August 24, 1896, John H. Brown was awarded the U.S. Medal of Honor for his valor during the Battle of Vicksburg. His citation read:

"Voluntarily carried a verbal message from Col. A. C. Parry to Gen. Hugh Ewing through a terrific fire and in plain view of the enemy.

== See also ==
- List of American Civil War Medal of Honor recipients: A–F
