= William H. Ward =

American officer of the United States Army

Captain William H. Ward
- Born: December 9, 1840; Adrian, Michigan, US
- Died: April 11, 1927 (aged 86)
- Burial place: Highland Park Cemetery, Kansas City, Kansas
- Military career
- Allegiance: United States of America; Union
- Branch: United States Army; Union Army
- Rank: Captain
- Units: Company B, 47th Ohio Infantry
- Conflicts: American Civil War
- Awards: - Medal of Honor

Captain William H. Ward (December 9, 1840 – April 11, 1927), American officer of the United States Army. He received the Medal of Honor for heroism at Vicksburg, Mississippi, May 3, 1863.

William Ward is buried at Highland Park Cemetery in Kansas City, Kansas.

== Medal of Honor citation ==
Rank and organization: Captain, Company B, 47th Ohio Infantry. Place and date: At Vicksburg, Miss., May 3, 1863. Entered service at: Adrian, Mich. Born: December 9, 1840, Adrian, Mich. Date of issue: January 2, 1895.

Citation:

Voluntarily commanded the expedition which, under cover of darkness, attempted to run the enemy's batteries.

== See also ==
- List of Medal of Honor recipients
- List of American Civil War Medal of Honor recipients: T–Z
