= John Harties Brown =

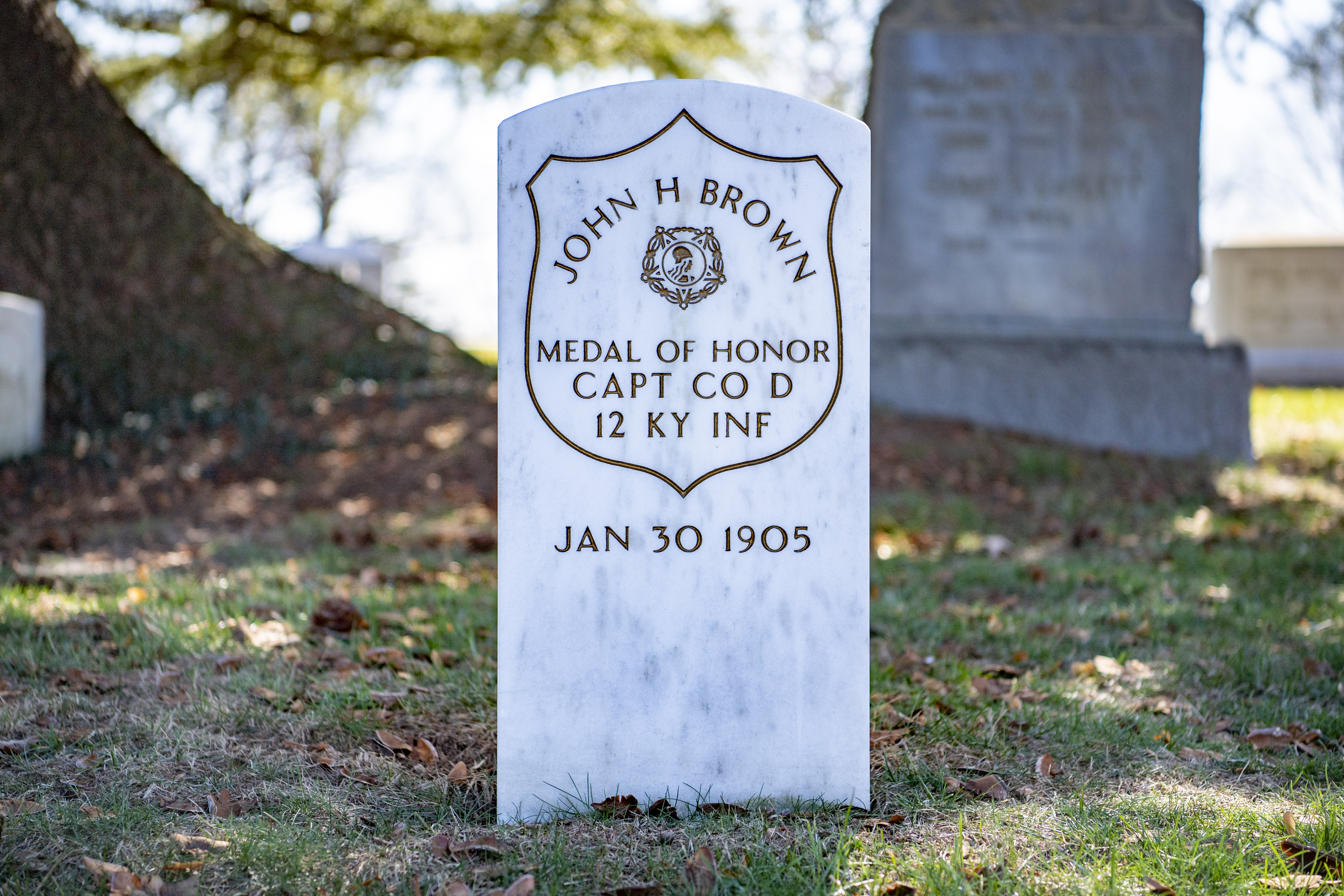
- Grave at Arlington National Cemetery
- Born: 1834; New Brunswick, British North America
- Died: January 30, 1905 (aged 70–71)
- Burial place: Arlington National Cemetery
- Military career
- Allegiance: United States of America
- Branch: United States Army
- Service years: 1861, 1862 - 1865
- Rank: Captain
- Unit: 12th Regiment Kentucky Volunteer Infantry
- Conflicts: Second Battle of Franklin; American Civil War
- Awards: Medal of Honor

Captain John Harties Brown (1834 to January 30, 1905) was a Canadian soldier who fought in the American Civil War. Brown received the United States' highest award for bravery during combat, the Medal of Honor, for his action during the Second Battle of Franklin in Tennessee on 30 November 1864. He was honored with the award on 13 February 1865.

== Biography ==
John Brown was born in New Brunswick in 1834. He initially joined the 5th Massachusetts Infantry from Charlestown, Massachusetts in April 1861, mustering out the following July. He joined the 36th Massachusetts Infantry as a sergeant in July 1862. In August 1863, he was commissioned as a Captain with the 12th Kentucky Infantry, and mustered out with this regiment in July 1865. John Brown was buried at Arlington National Cemetery.

== Medal of Honor citation ==
Capture of flag.

== See also ==
- List of American Civil War Medal of Honor recipients: A–F
