= John Hack (Medal of Honor) =

American Civil War Medal of Honor recipient

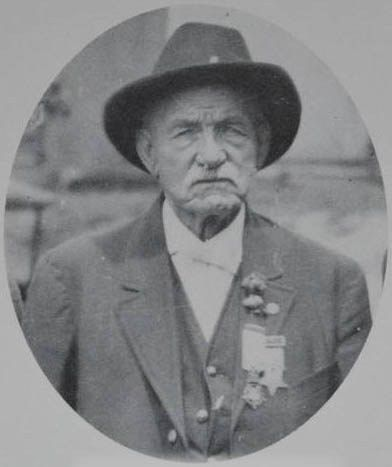
- Hack c. 1915
- Born: November 26, 1842
- Died: March 29, 1933 (aged 90); Trenton, Missouri, US
- Military career
- Allegiance: United States
- Branch: United States Army; Union Army
- Rank: Private
- Units: Company B, 47th Ohio Volunteer Infantry Regiment
- Conflicts: American Civil War
- Awards: Medal of Honor

John Hack (November 26, 1842 – March 29, 1933) was a decorated hero of the Union Army in the American Civil War.

== Medal ==
According to the Military Times Hall of Valor, "on 3 May 1863, while serving with Company B, 47th Ohio Infantry, in action at Vicksburg, Mississippi. Private Hack was one of a party which volunteered and attempted to run the enemy's batteries with a steam tug and two barges loaded with subsistence stores." Hodges and nine others in Company B did this while Confederate States Army batteries were shooting at them "under cover of darkness" Hodges was awarded the Medal of Honor "for extreme bravery under fire" on December 31, 1907.

Rank and organization: Private, Company B, 47th Ohio Infantry. Place and date: At Vicksburg, MS., May 3, 1863

Citation:

Was one of a party which volunteered and attempted to run the enemy's batteries with a steam tug and 2 barges loaded with subsistence stores.

== Post War ==
Hack returned to Ohio and married Delphina Cooley. They had three children.

== See also ==
- Siege of Vicksburg
- 47th Ohio Volunteer Infantry Regiment
- List of Medal of Honor recipients
- List of American Civil War Medal of Honor recipients: G–L
