= Christian Albert (soldier) =

Union Army Medal of Honor recipient (1842–1922)

- Born: June 13, 1842; Cincinnati, Ohio, U.S.
- Died: April 16, 1922 (aged 79); Toledo, Ohio, U.S.
- Burial place: Woodlawn Cemetery, Toledo, Ohio
- Military career
- Allegiance: United States of America; Union
- Branch: United States Army; Union Army
- Service years: 1861–1865
- Rank: Private
- Units: Company G, 47th Ohio Infantry
- Conflicts: American Civil War: Battle of Vicksburg
- Awards: Medal of Honor

Christian Albert (June 13, 1842 – April 16, 1922) was an American soldier who received the Medal of Honor for valor during the American Civil War.

== Biography ==
Christian Albert was born in Cincinnati, Ohio in 1842. While a Private in Company G of the 47th Ohio Infantry, he distinguished himself at the Battle of Vicksburg on May 22, 1863.

He is buried in Woodlawn Cemetery in Toledo, Ohio.

== Medal of Honor citation ==
Rank and organization: Private, Company G, 47th Ohio Infantry. Place and date: At Vicksburg, Miss., May 22, 1863. Entered service at: ------. Birth: Cincinnati, Ohio. Date of issue: August 10, 1895.

Citation:

Gallantry in the charge of the "volunteer storming party."

== See also ==
- List of Medal of Honor recipients
- List of American Civil War Medal of Honor recipients: A–F
- Battle of Vicksburg
- 47th Ohio Infantry
