= Palmyra Township, Michigan =

- Civil township
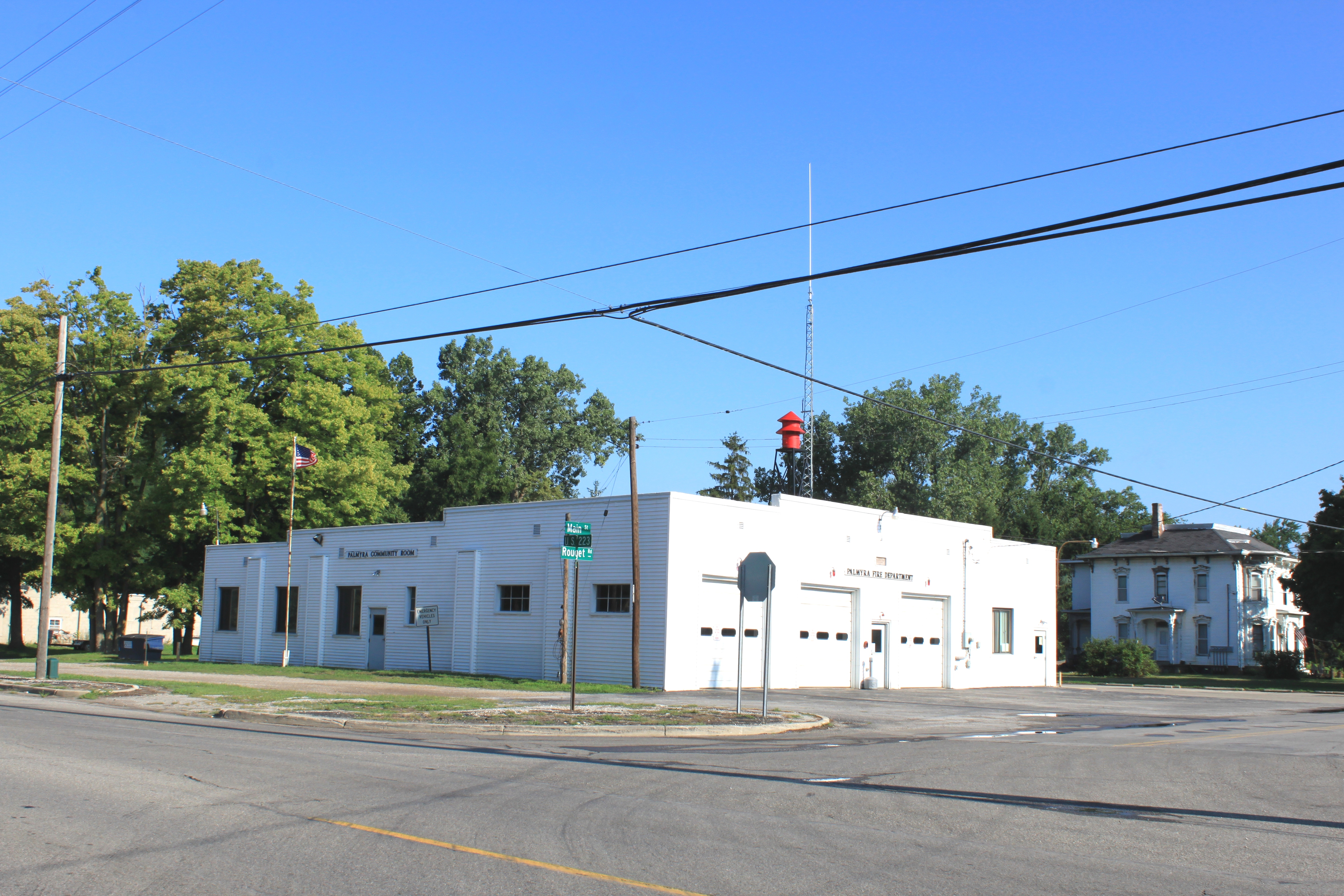
- Palmyra Township Hall

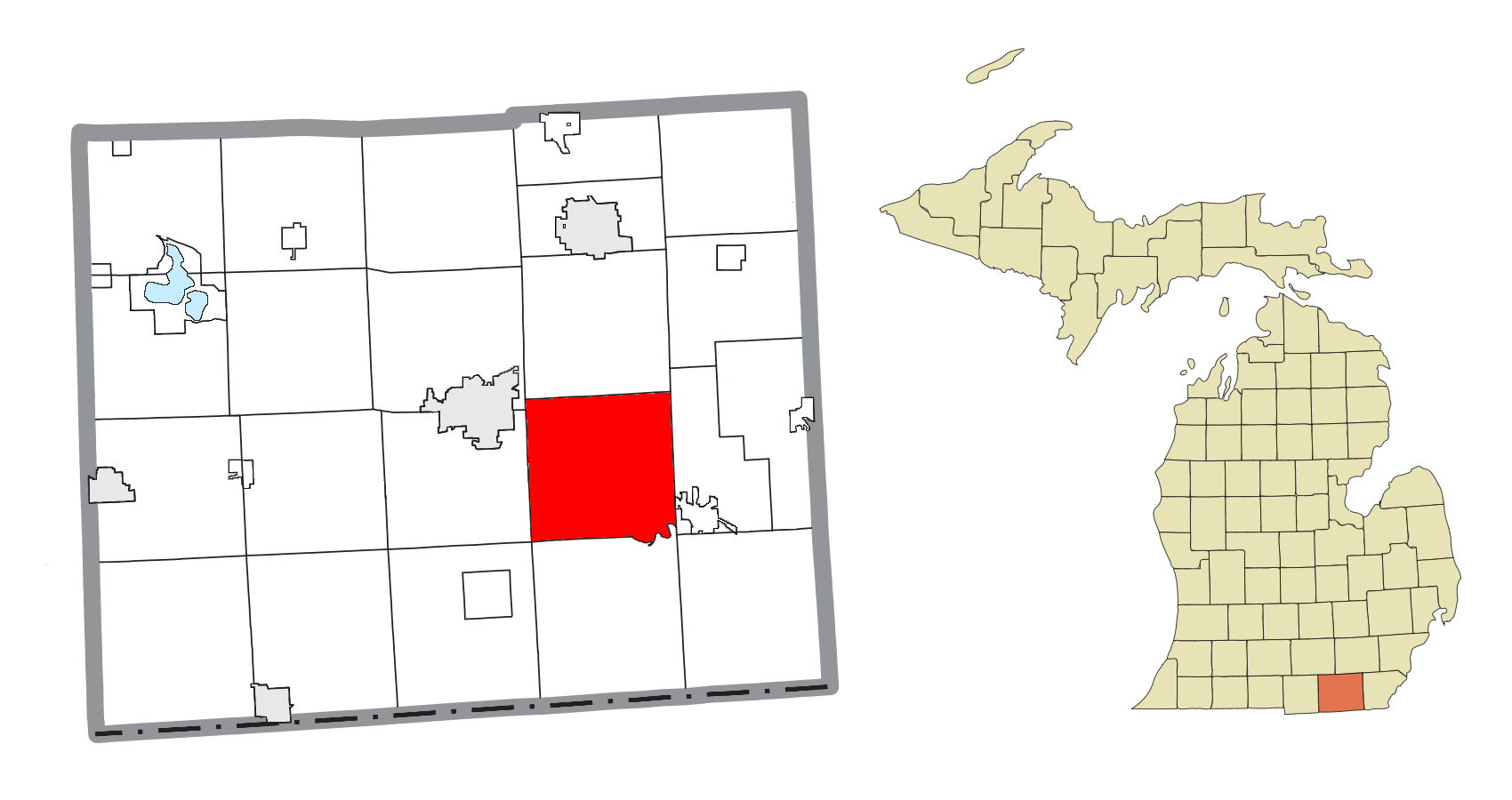
- Location within Lenawee County

- Location within the state of Michigan Palmyra Township (the United States)
- Coordinates: 41°52′00″N 83°57′00″W
- Country: United States
- State: Michigan
- County: Lenawee
- Established: 1834

Government
  - Supervisor: Dave Pixley
  - Clerk: Christine Whited

Area
  - Total: 36.7 sq mi (95.0 km^{2})
  - Land: 36.7 sq mi (95.0 km^{2})
  - Water: 0 sq mi (0.0 km^{2})
- Elevation: 712 ft (217 m)

Population (2020)
  - Total: 2,031
  - Density: 55.4/sq mi (21.4/km^{2})
- Time zone: UTC-5 (Eastern (EST))
  - Summer (DST): UTC-4 (EDT)
- ZIP code(s): 49221 (Adrian); 49228 (Blissfield); 49248 (Jasper); 49268 (Palmyra)
- Area code: 517
- FIPS code: 26-62240
- GNIS feature ID: 1626878
- Website: www.palmyratownship.net

Palmyra Township is a civil township of Lenawee County in the U.S. state of Michigan. The population was 2,031 at the 2020 census.

== Geography ==
According to the United States Census Bureau, the township has a total area of 36.7 square miles (95 km^{2}), of which 36.7 square miles (95 km^{2}) is land and 0.03% is water.

== Demographics ==
As of the census of 2000, there were 2,366 people, 793 households, and 619 families residing in the township. The population density was 64.5 inhabitants per square mile (24.9/km^{2}). There were 848 housing units at an average density of 23.1 per square mile (8.9/km^{2}). The racial makeup of the township was 88.38% White, 0.89% African American, 0.55% Native American, 0.13% Asian, 8.20% from other races, and 1.86% from two or more races. Hispanic or Latino of any race were 13.23% of the population.

There were 793 households, out of which 34.4% had children under the age of 18 living with them, 65.1% were married couples living together, 7.9% had a female householder with no husband present, and 21.9% were non-families. 18.4% of all households were made up of individuals, and 8.7% had someone living alone who was 65 years of age or older. The average household size was 2.70 and the average family size was 3.04.

In the township the population was spread out, with 27.0% under the age of 18, 8.3% from 18 to 24, 29.4% from 25 to 44, 22.1% from 45 to 64, and 13.2% who were 65 years of age or older. The median age was 36 years. For every 100 females, there were 108.3 males. For every 100 females age 18 and over, there were 108.1 males.

The median income for a household in the township was $49,598, and the median income for a family was $56,333. Males had a median income of $34,954 versus $26,202 for females. The per capita income for the township was $18,843. About 2.6% of families and 6.1% of the population were below the poverty line, including 5.4% of those under age 18 and 5.7% of those age 65 or over.
