= Blissfield, Michigan =

- Village
- Village of Blissfield
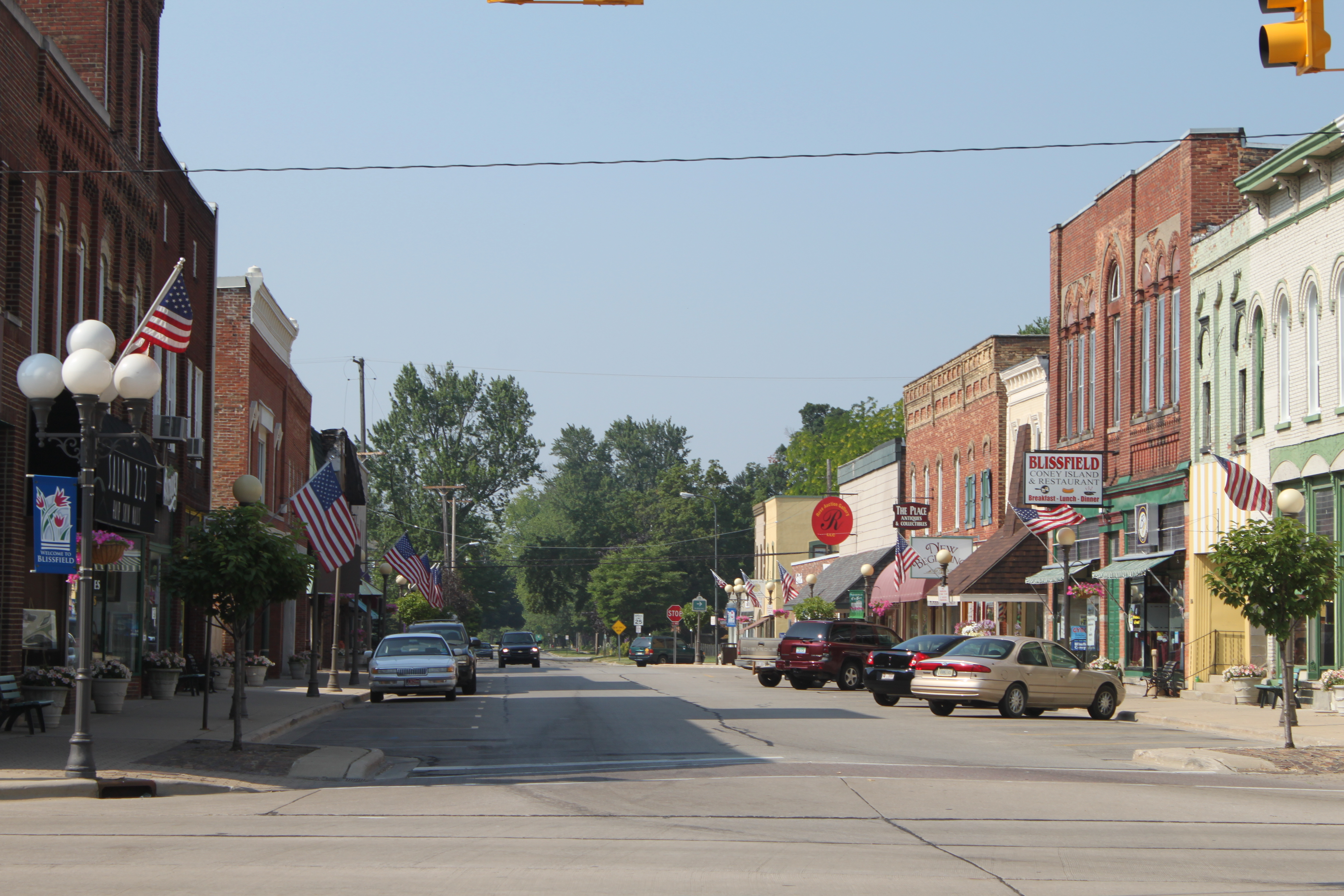
- Downtown Blissfield along Lane Street

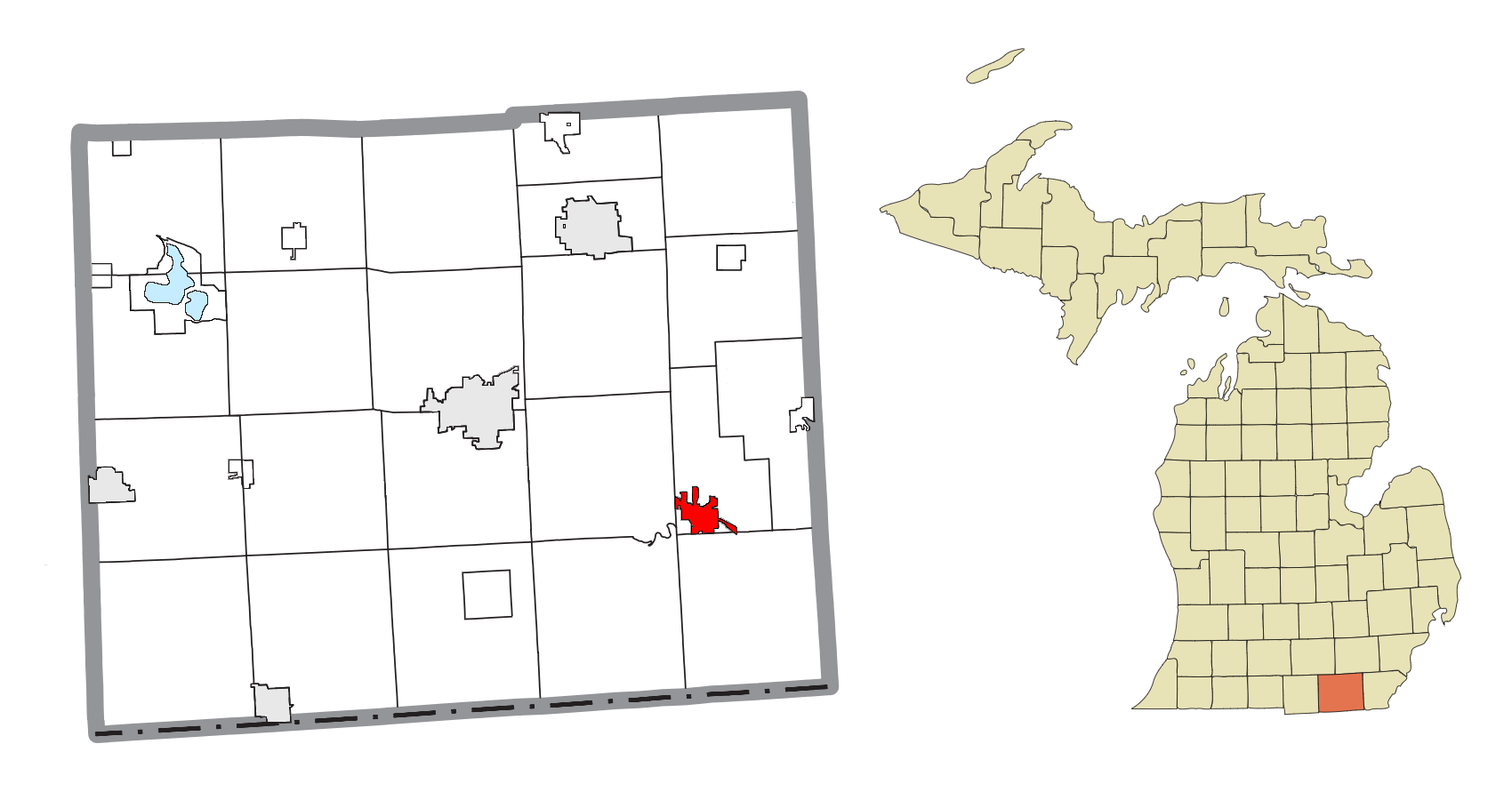
- Location within Lenawee County

- Location within the state of Michigan Location within the United States
- Coordinates: 41°49′54″N 83°51′50″W
- Country: United States
- State: Michigan
- County: Lenawee
- Townships: Blissfield, Palmyra, and Riga
- Settled: 1826
- Incorporated: 1875

Government
  - Type: Village council
  - President: Mike Gunter
  - Clerk: Lisa Novak

Area
  - Total: 2.27 sq mi (5.88 km^{2})
  - Land: 2.22 sq mi (5.74 km^{2})
  - Water: 0.054 sq mi (0.14 km^{2})
- Elevation: 690 ft (210 m)

Population (2020)
  - Total: 3,277
  - Density: 1,478.1/sq mi (570.68/km^{2})
- Time zone: UTC-5 (Eastern (EST))
  - Summer (DST): UTC-4 (EDT)
- ZIP code(s): 49228
- Area code: 517
- FIPS code: 26-09000
- GNIS feature ID: 2398133
- Website: Official website

Blissfield is a village in Lenawee County in the U.S. state of Michigan. The population was 3,277 at the 2020 census. The village is mostly located within Blissfield Township with only very small portions extending west into Palmyra Township and south into Riga Township. The Blissfield post office first opened March 28, 1828. Hervey Bliss, who was the first white settler in 1824 and for whom the town is named, was the first postmaster.

== History ==
During World War II, 16 German POWs, who were working on a sugar beet farm near Blissfield, were killed in an accident when their truck collided with a train as they were returning to Fort Custer. They are now buried at Fort Custer National Cemetery.

According to local legend, Blissfield was home to the first set of Triple Bridges in the world. These three bridges stood directly next to each other and crossed the River Raisin to accommodate train and vehicular travel. The interurban bridge was torn down and the road bridge was replaced with a larger bridge in place of both bridges.

In September–October 2014 Blissfield's village hall was moved to a former KeyBank location in the business district of the village. It is now two doors down from the Township offices. The police department was also moved with it.

Blissfield High School is the home of the Royals. The baseball team has won seven state titles, while the girls volleyball team won their first state title in 2005.

The village contains three properties listed on the National Register of Historic Places: Blissfield Downtown Historic District, the David Carpenter House, and the First Presbyterian Church of Blissfield.

== Geography ==
According to the United States Census Bureau, the village has a total area of 2.30 square miles (5.96 km^{2}), of which 2.24 square miles (5.80 km^{2}) is land and 0.06 square miles (0.16 km^{2}) is water.

The village occupies portions of three civil townships: Blissfield, Palmyra, and Riga. Of the township's 2.30 square miles (5.96 km^{2}) of total area, 2.27 square miles (5.88 km^{2}), or 98.7%, is located within Blissfield Township. Of the population of 3,340 at 2010 census, all but eight residents lived within Blissfield Township. The remaining eight lived in Palmyra Township, and no residents lived in the Riga Township portion of the village of Blissfield.

== Demographics ==
Historical population
Census	Pop.	Note	%±
1880	1,222		—
1890	1,132		−7.4%
1900	1,268		12.0%
1910	1,474		16.2%
1920	1,906		29.3%
1930	2,103		10.3%
1940	2,144		1.9%
1950	2,365		10.3%
1960	2,653		12.2%
1970	2,753		3.8%
1980	3,107		12.9%
1990	3,172		2.1%
2000	3,223		1.6%
2010	3,340		3.6%
2020	3,277		−1.9%
U.S. Decennial Census

=== 2020 census ===
As of the 2020 census, Blissfield had a population of 3,277. The median age was 41.4 years. 22.6% of residents were under the age of 18 and 19.6% of residents were 65 years of age or older. For every 100 females there were 94.1 males, and for every 100 females age 18 and over there were 91.4 males age 18 and over.

0.0% of residents lived in urban areas, while 100.0% lived in rural areas.

There were 1,388 households in Blissfield, of which 30.3% had children under the age of 18 living in them. Of all households, 48.4% were married-couple households, 17.5% were households with a male householder and no spouse or partner present, and 27.3% were households with a female householder and no spouse or partner present. About 29.2% of all households were made up of individuals and 13.9% had someone living alone who was 65 years of age or older.

There were 1,456 housing units, of which 4.7% were vacant. The homeowner vacancy rate was 1.3% and the rental vacancy rate was 3.2%.

Racial composition as of the 2020 census
Race	Number	Percent
White	3,052	93.1%
Black or African American	8	0.2%
American Indian and Alaska Native	18	0.5%
Asian	11	0.3%
Native Hawaiian and Other Pacific Islander	0	0.0%
Some other race	53	1.6%
Two or more races	135	4.1%
Hispanic or Latino (of any race)	208	6.3%

=== 2010 census ===
As of the census of 2010, there were 3,340 people, 1,349 households, and 924 families living in the village. The population density was 1,491.1 inhabitants per square mile (575.7/km^{2}). There were 1,470 housing units at an average density of 656.2 per square mile (253.4/km^{2}). The racial makeup of the village was 96.6% White, 0.3% African American, 0.5% Native American, 0.2% Asian, 0.8% from other races, and 1.6% from two or more races. Hispanic or Latino of any race were 5.1% of the population.

There were 1,349 households, of which 34.2% had children under the age of 18 living with them, 52.2% were married couples living together, 12.5% had a female householder with no husband present, 3.8% had a male householder with no wife present, and 31.5% were non-families. 27.7% of all households were made up of individuals, and 13.6% had someone living alone who was 65 years of age or older. The average household size was 2.48 and the average family size was 3.00.

The median age in the village was 38.8 years. 25.6% of residents were under the age of 18; 7.3% were between the ages of 18 and 24; 25.3% were from 25 to 44; 26.2% were from 45 to 64; and 15.5% were 65 years of age or older. The gender makeup of the village was 48.3% male and 51.7% female.

=== 2000 census ===
As of the census of 2000, there were 3,223 people, 1,319 households, and 903 families living in the village. The population density was 1,520.7 inhabitants per square mile (587.1/km^{2}). There were 1,388 housing units at an average density of 654.9 per square mile (252.9/km^{2}). The racial makeup of the village was 96.59% White, 0.06% African American, 0.03% Native American, 0.06% Asian, 2.61% from other races, and 0.65% from two or more races. Hispanic or Latino of any race were 6.14% of the population.

There were 1,319 households, out of which 32.5% had children under the age of 18 living with them, 55.9% were married couples living together, 9.4% had a female householder with no husband present, and 31.5% were non-families. 27.5% of all households were made up of individuals, and 15.8% had someone living alone who was 65 years of age or older. The average household size was 2.42 and the average family size was 2.96.

In the village, the population was spread out, with 26.0% under the age of 18, 8.1% from 18 to 24, 28.0% from 25 to 44, 22.1% from 45 to 64, and 15.8% who were 65 years of age or older. The median age was 37 years. For every 100 females, there were 90.1 males. For every 100 females age 18 and over, there were 87.6 males.

The median income for a household in the village was $39,438, and the median income for a family was $48,964. Males had a median income of $37,218 versus $25,069 for females. The per capita income for the village was $19,255. About 6.9% of families and 8.4% of the population were below the poverty line, including 10.0% of those under age 18 and 9.4% of those age 65 or over.

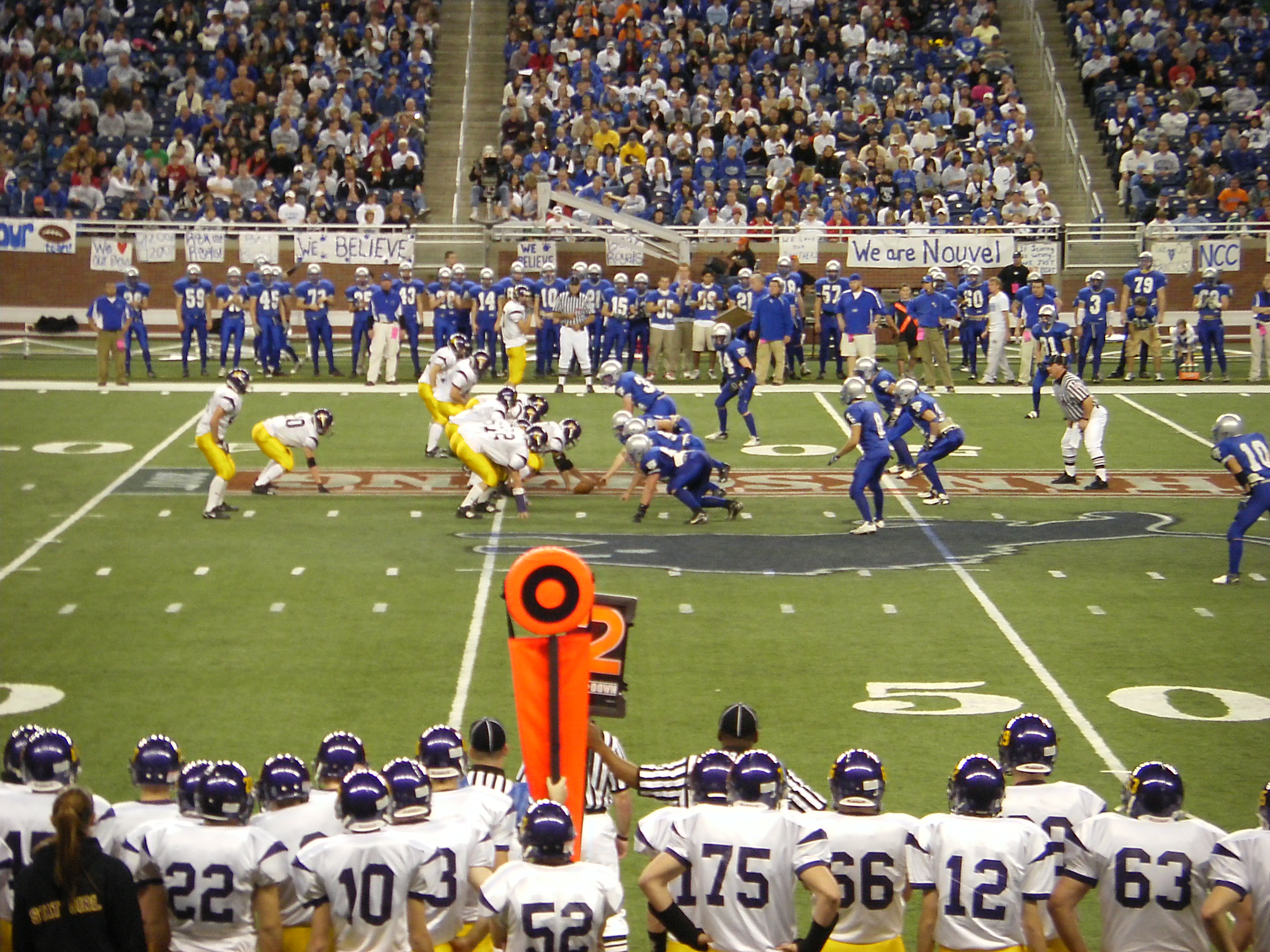
2007 State Finals at Ford Field

== Transportation ==
- US 223

== Gallery ==
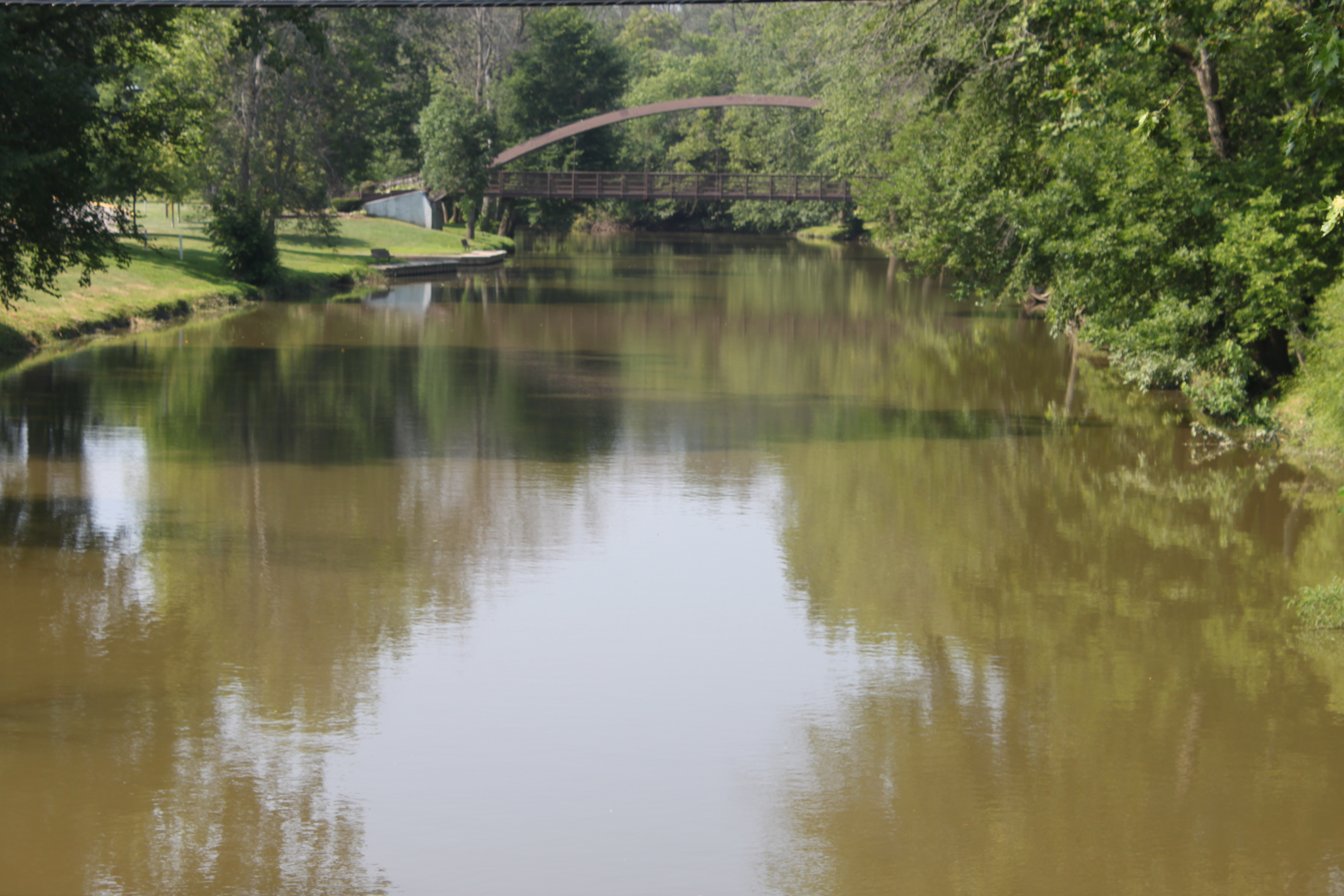
River Raisin from bridge on Adrian St.

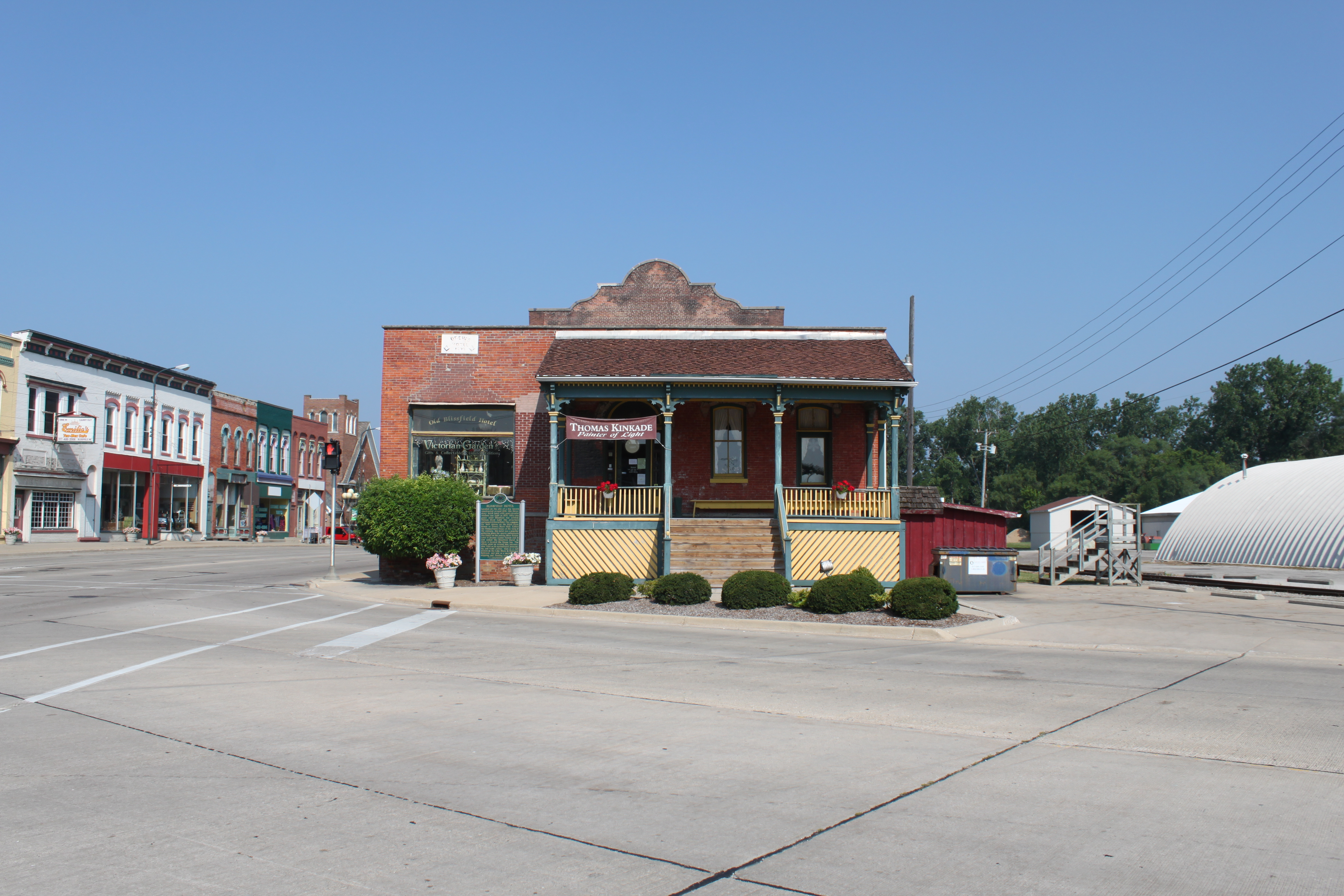
Old Blissfield Hotel, Lane St.

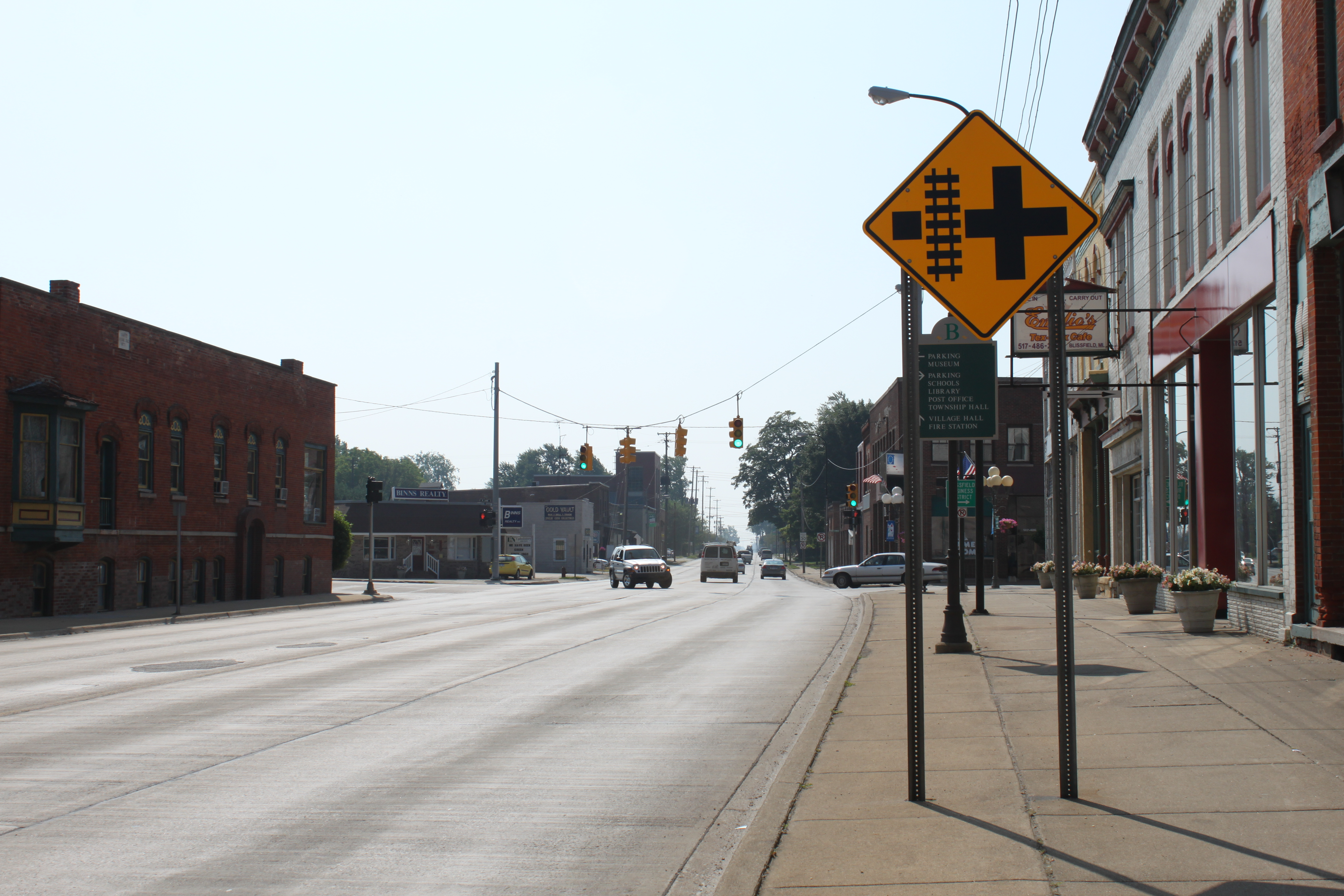
Adrian St., facing east

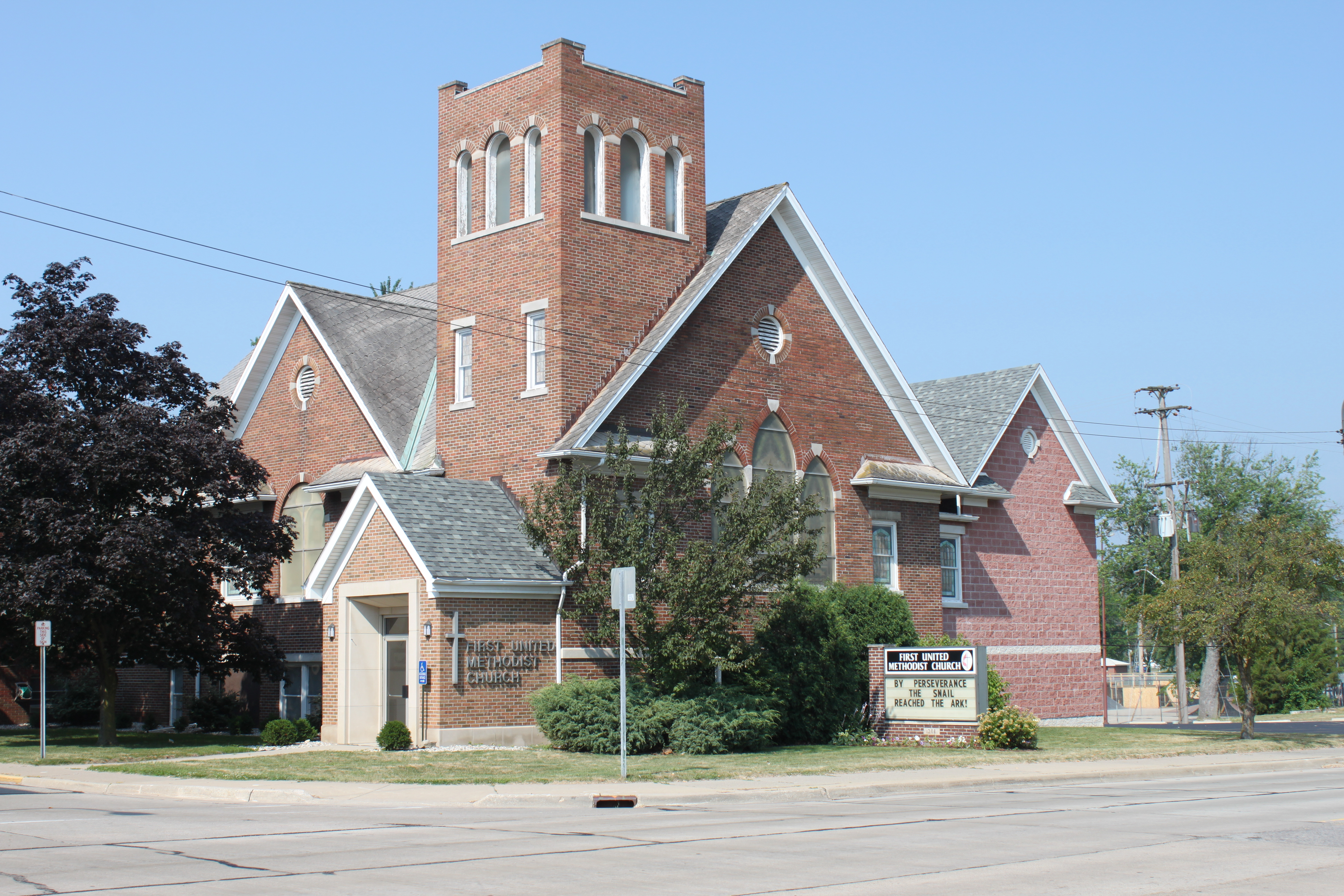
First United Methodist Church, Adrian St.

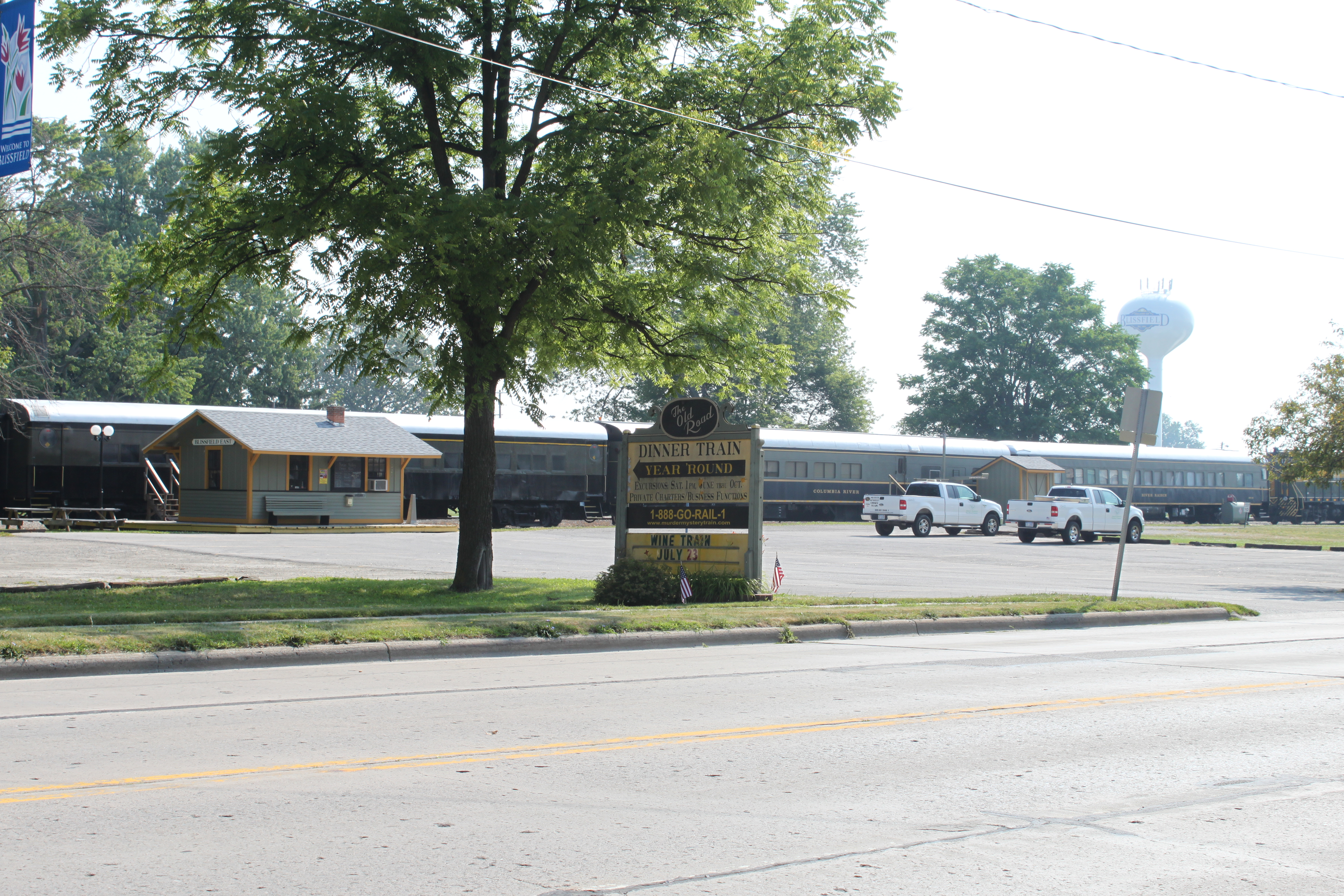
The Old Road dinner train, Adrian St.

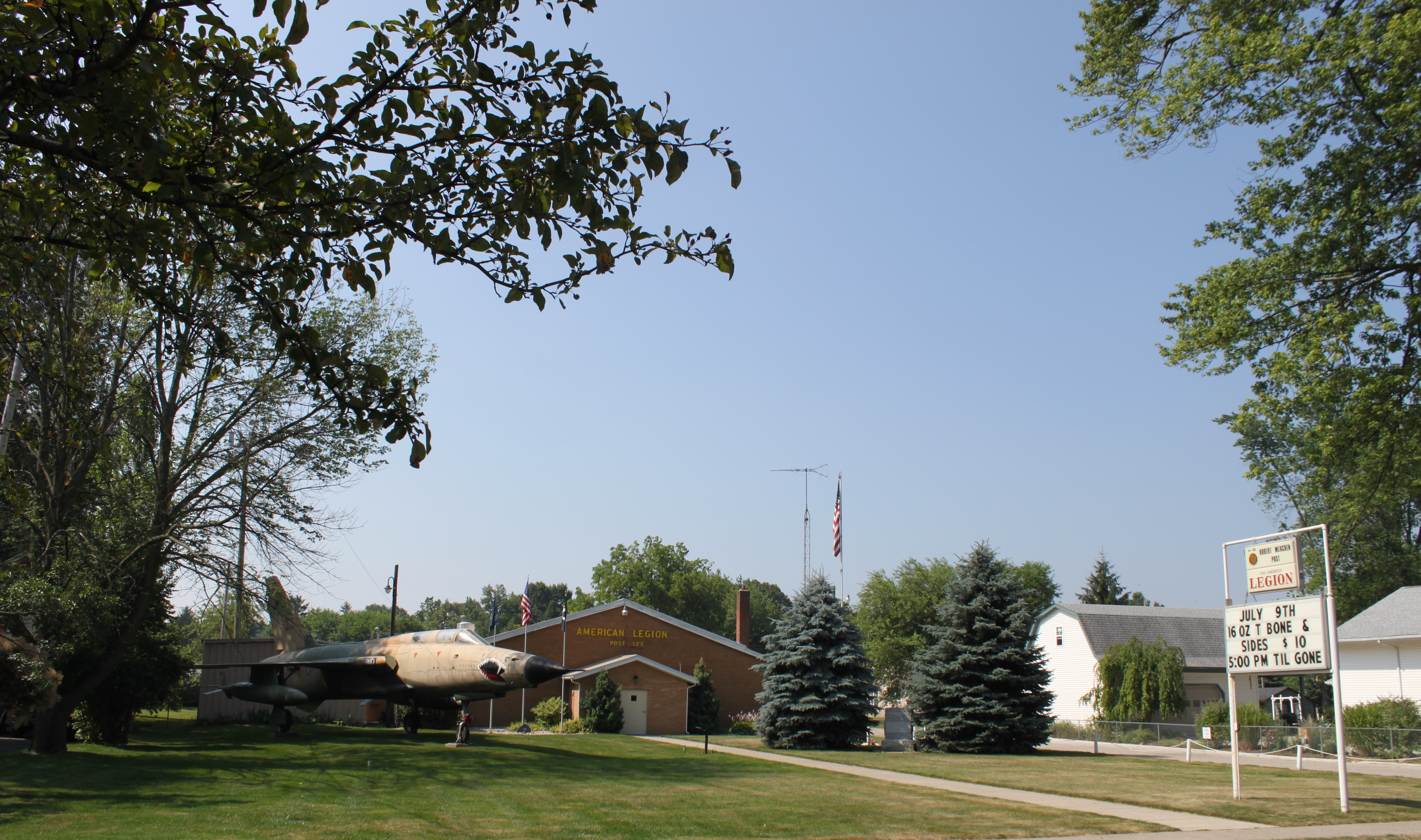
American Legion post 325, with F-105 on display, Adrian St.
