= 94 Squadron =

94 Squadron or 94th Squadron may refer to:

- No. 94 Squadron RAF, a unit of the British Royal Air Force
- No. 94 Squadron RAAF, a unit of the Royal Australian Air Force
- 94th Aero Squadron, a unit of the United States Army Air Service
- 94th Fighter Squadron, a unit of the United States Air Force
- 94th Flying Training Squadron, a unit of the United States Air Force
- VA-94 (U.S. Navy) (Attack Squadron 94)
- VFA-94 (Strike Fighter Squadron 94), a unit of the United States Navy
- VP-94 (Patrol Squadron 94), a unit of the United States Navy
- VPB-94 (Patrol Bombing Squadron 94), a unit of the United States Navy
