= Bringle =

Bringle is a surname. Notable people with the surname include:

- Andrew Bringle (fl. 1860s), American soldier
- Cynthia Bringle (born 1939), American potter
- William F. Bringle (1913–1999), United States Navy senior officer

== See also ==
- Brengle, another surname
