= William F. Bringle =

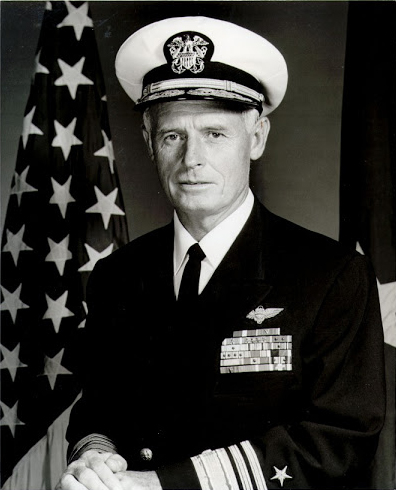
- William F. Bringle as vice admiral
- Born: April 23, 1913; Covington, Tennessee, U.S
- Died: March 19, 1999 (aged 85); Rancho Santa Fe, California, U.S.
- Military career
- Allegiance: United States
- Branch: United States Navy
- Service years: 1933–1974
- Rank: Admiral
- Nickname: Bush
- Commands: United States Naval Forces Europe; United States Seventh Fleet; Task Force 77; Carrier Division 7 USS Kitty Hawk (CV-63); Heavy Attack Wing Two; Carrier Air Group One; Carrier Air Group Seventeen; VOF-1
- Conflicts: World War II; Vietnam War
- Awards: Navy Cross; Navy Distinguished Service Medal; Legion of Merit (2); Distinguished Flying Cross (6); Air Medal (17)

Admiral William Floyd Bringle (April 23, 1913 – March 19, 1999) was a senior officer in the United States Navy. He was the first commanding officer of USS Kitty Hawk (CV-63), commanded the United States Seventh Fleet from 1967 to 1970 during the Vietnam War, and as commander, United States Naval Forces Europe from 1971 to 1973.

== Early life and career ==
William F. Bringle was born in Covington, Tennessee, on April 23, 1913, the son of Lota Smith Bringle and William F. Bringle. He attended the Byars-Hall High School and Columbia Military Academy before his appointment to the United States Naval Academy. Graduating in June 1937, he was commissioned an ensign and, through subsequent advancement, attained the rank of captain on July 1, 1955.

During his career, Bringle served in numerous sea and shore assignments. His first was aboard the aircraft carrier Saratoga in the gunnery, communications and engineering departments as a junior officer until 1940. Reporting to the Naval Air Station Pensacola for flight training, he was designated a Naval Aviator in December 1940.

== World War II ==
In January 1941, Bringle served as senior aviator aboard the light cruiser USS Milwaukee (CL-5). He eventually became commanding officer of Cruiser Scouting Squadron Two, operating on the light cruisers USS Omaha (CL-4) and USS Savannah (CL-42).

From September to November 1943, Bringle trained at the Naval Air Station Melbourne and, in December, formed the first Observation Fighting Squadron (VOF-1). He commanded the squadron throughout the period of hostilities and was awarded the Navy Cross for "extraordinary heroism in action against enemy forces during the Allied invasion of Southern France in August 1944." Bringle also received the Croix de Guerre with Silver Star from the Government of France for his part in the invasion. Reassigned to the Pacific War again, Bringle and his squadron embarked in the escort carrier USS Wake Island (CVE-65) and later USS Marcus Island (CVE-77).

While under his command, the squadron participated in strikes against enemy held installations in Leyte, Luzon, Iwo Jima, Sakishima Gunto, Nansei Shoto area, Okinawa and many other Pacific islands. His squadron contributed materially to the success of these combat operations in the performance of its primary function of spotting for naval gunfire and close air support of ground forces in repeated bombing and rocket attacks against enemy troops and installations. For his outstanding service during these engagements and others, he was awarded the Distinguished Flying Cross with gold stars in lieu of five additional awards of that medal as well as the Air Medal with gold stars in lieu of sixteen additional similar awards.

== Post-war, through early 1960s ==
After World War II, from October 1945 until October 1946, Bringle was the air group commander of Carrier Air Group Seventeen, and when detached he returned to the Naval Academy for duty as a battalion commander. He remained there until June 1948.

Returning again to sea, Bringle filled the post of commander, Carrier Air Group One aboard the aircraft carriers USS Tarawa (CV-40) and USS Philippine Sea (CV-47). From 1950 to 1952, he served as a member of the Superintendent's Staff at the Naval Academy. The next year, as a student, he attended the Naval War College at Newport, Rhode Island.

Another year and a half of sea duty as executive officer of the carrier Hornet, 1953 to 1954, was alternated with two and a half years of shore duty as head of the Operational Intelligence Branch of the Chief of Naval Operations, and as the personal aide to the Secretary of the Navy. In 1957, Bringle assumed command of Heavy Attack Wing Two, operating A3D Skywarrior bombers in the Pacific. He served in this command until July 1958, when he was ordered to become the Commandant of Midshipmen at the United States Naval Academy.

Bringle, in May 1960, received orders designating him as the prospective commanding officer (PCO) of the navy's newest attack carrier, the USS Kitty Hawk (CV-63), building at the New York Shipbuilding Corporation of Camden, New Jersey. He became the first commanding officer on her commissioning day, April 29, 1961.

In June 1962 Bringle was assigned to the Office of the Chief of Naval Operations, where he served as Assistant Director of the Aviation Plans Division until January 1963, when he was designated the Director of that division.

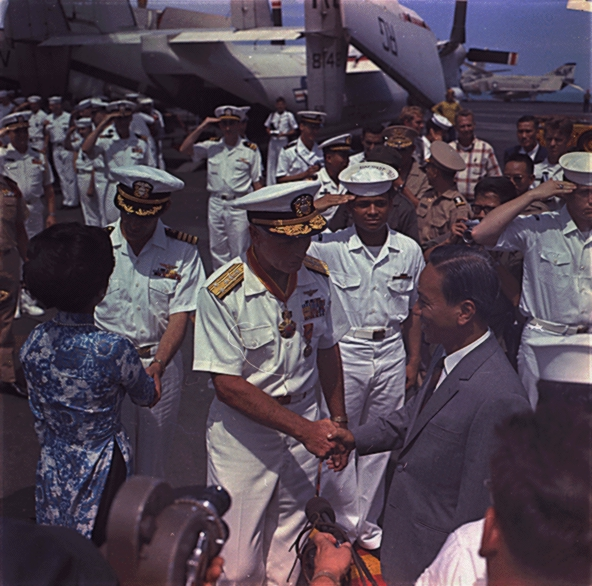
Bringle shaking hands with President and Madame Nguyen Van Thieu as they depart after a visit aboard USS Constellation

== Flag Assignments ==
On April 6, 1964, Bringle assumed command of Carrier Division 7. In addition to commanding Carrier Division Seven, Bringle served as Commander Task Group 77.6, during the period of March 29, to June 29, 1965, and as Commander Task Force 77 (CTF-77) from May 28, to June 27, 1965. For service in these capacities, he was awarded the Legion of Merit with Combat "V" for "exceptionally meritorious conduct in the performance of outstanding service, Rear Admiral Bringle masterfully directed the combat operations of his forces in support of the Republic of Vietnam. He consistently demonstrated outstanding leadership and professional skill in repeatedly responding to a constantly changing environment".

In July 1965, Bringle was ordered to the Staff of Commander in Chief, United States Pacific Fleet, where he assumed the Office of Deputy Chief of Staff for Operations and Plans. Bringle was Commander, United States Seventh Fleet from 1967 to 1970. Later, as a four-star admiral, he was the Commander, United States Naval Forces Europe from 1971 to 1973.

Bringle died on March 19, 1999, at Rancho Santa Fe, California.

== Awards and honors ==

Naval Aviator Badge
Navy Cross	Navy Distinguished Service Medal	Legion of Merit with Combat "V"	Distinguished Flying Cross with one silver award star
Air Medal with three silver and one gold award stars	Navy Unit Commendation with one bronze service star (USS Marcus Island)	American Defense Service Medal with service star	American Campaign Medal
European-African-Middle Eastern Theater Medal with service star	Asiatic-Pacific Campaign Medal with four service stars	World War II Victory Medal	Navy Occupation Service Medal
China Service Medal	National Defense Service Medal with bronze star	Armed Forces Expeditionary Medal	Croix de guerre 1939–1945 (France) with silver star
National Order of Vietnam, Commander	Vietnam Gallantry Cross with palm	Philippine Liberation Medal with service star	Vietnam Campaign Medal
