= Brengle =

Brengle is a surname. Notable people with the surname include:

- Francis Brengle (1807–1846), American politician
- Madison Brengle (born 1990), American tennis player
- Samuel Logan Brengle (1860–1936), American Salvationist

== See also ==
- Bringle, another surname
- Brendle, another surname
