= James L. Carey =

American Civil War Medal of Honor recipient (1839–1919)

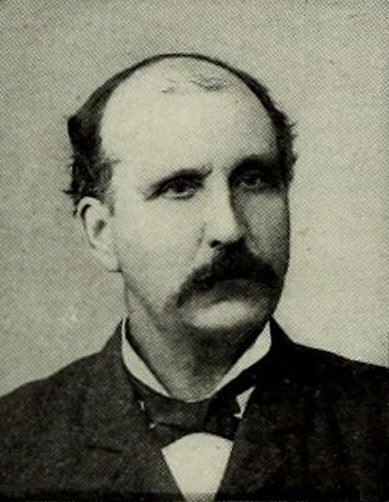
- Born: December 24, 1839; Onondaga County, New York
- Died: May 15, 1919 (aged 79); Carnegie, Pennsylvania
- Burial place: Carnegie, Pennsylvania
- Military career
- Allegiance: United States of America
- Branch: United States Army
- Rank: Sergeant
- Unit: (New York (state)) 10th Regiment New York Volunteer Cavalry
- Conflicts: Appomattox Courthouse
- Awards: Medal of Honor

James Lemuel Carey (24 December 1839 – 15 May 1919) was a Union Army soldier who was awarded the Medal of Honor in the American Civil War. He was born in Onondaga County, New York.

Carey enlisted in the Army from Syracuse, New York in December 1861 (his name was misspelled as James C. Cary), and was assigned to the 10th New York Cavalry. He was promoted to Sergeant in March 1865. He transferred to the 1st New York Provisional Cavalry in June 1865, and mustered out with that regiment the next month.

Carey was buried in Chartiers Cemetery in Carnegie, Pennsylvania

== Medal of Honor citation ==
Rank and organization: Sergeant, Company G, 10th New York Cavalry. Place and date: At Appomattox Courthouse, Va., 9 April 1865. Entered service at: ------ Birth: Onondaga County, N.Y. Date of issue: Unknown.

Daring bravery and urging the men forward in a charge.
