= Herbert E. Farnsworth =

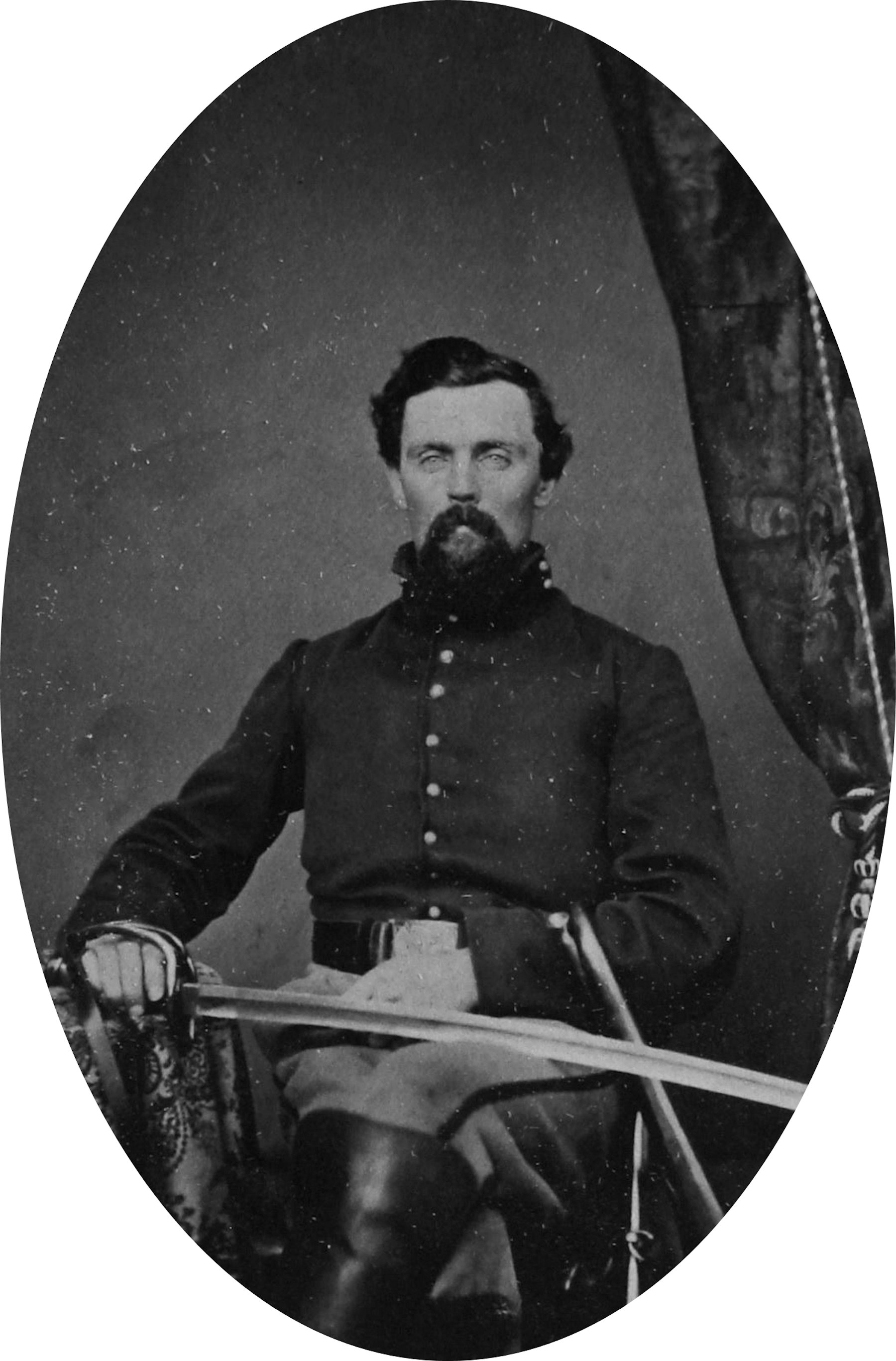
- Medal of Honor winner Sergeant Major Herbert E. Farnsworth 1864
- Born: August 23, 1834; Perrysburg, New York, US
- Died: July 4, 1908 (aged 73); Pomeroy, Washington, US
- Burial place: Pomeroy City Cemetery
- Military career
- Allegiance: United States of America
- Branch: United States Army; Union Army
- Service years: 1861 - 1865
- Rank: Sergeant Major
- Unit: (New York (state)) 10th New York Volunteer Cavalry Regiment
- Conflicts: Battle of Trevilian Station
- Awards: Medal of Honor

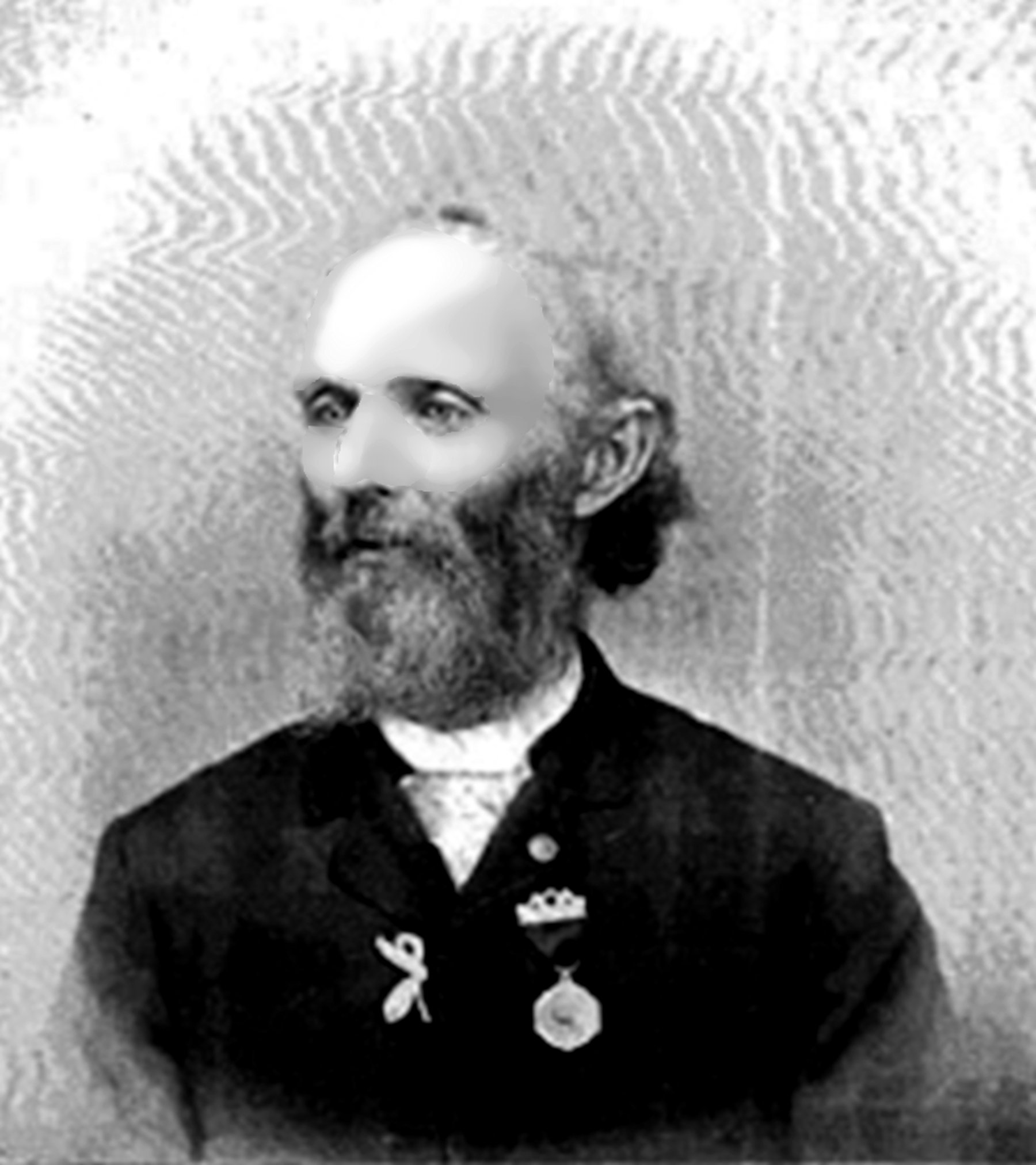
Medal of Honor winner Sergeant Major Herbert E. Farnsworth 1898

Herbert E. Farnsworth (August 23, 1834 – July 4, 1908) was an American soldier who fought in the American Civil War. Farnsworth received the United States' highest award for bravery during combat, the Medal of Honor, for his action during the Battle of Trevilian Station at Trevilian Station in Virginia on June 11, 1864. He was honored with the award on April 1, 1898.

== Biography ==
Farnsworth was born in Perrysburg, New York, on August 23, 1834. He joined the 10th New York Cavalry as a bugler in September 1861. By June 1864, the time of his meritorious action, he was the regiment's Sergeant Major. He was commissioned as a first lieutenant in August 1864 and mustered out in June 1865. Farnsworth died on 4 July 1908, and his remains are interred at Pomeroy City Cemetery in Washington.

== Medal of Honor citation ==
The President of the United States of America, in the name of Congress, takes pleasure in presenting the Medal of Honor to Sergeant Major Herbert E. Farnsworth, United States Army, for extraordinary heroism on 11 June 1864, while serving with 10th New York Cavalry (Porter Guard), in action at Trevilian Station, Virginia. Sergeant Major Farnsworth voluntarily carried a message which stopped the firing of a Union battery into his regiment, in which service he crossed a ridge in plain view and swept by the fire of both armies.

== See also ==
- List of American Civil War Medal of Honor recipients: A–F
