= 10th New York Cavalry Regiment =

- Active: August 1861 to June 17, 1865
- Country: United States
- Allegiance: Union
- Branch: Cavalry
- Engagements: Battle of Fredericksburg; Battle of Brandy Station; Stoneman's 1863 Raid; Battle of Middleburg; Battle of Gettysburg; Battle of Shepherdstown; Bristoe Campaign; Battle of Bristoe Station; Mine Run Campaign; Battle of the Wilderness; Battle of Spotsylvania Court House; Battle of Haw's Shop; Battle of Trevilian Station; Siege of Petersburg; First Battle of Deep Bottom; Battle of Hatcher's Run; Appomattox Campaign; Battle of Five Forks; Battle of Sailor's Creek; Battle of Appomattox Court House

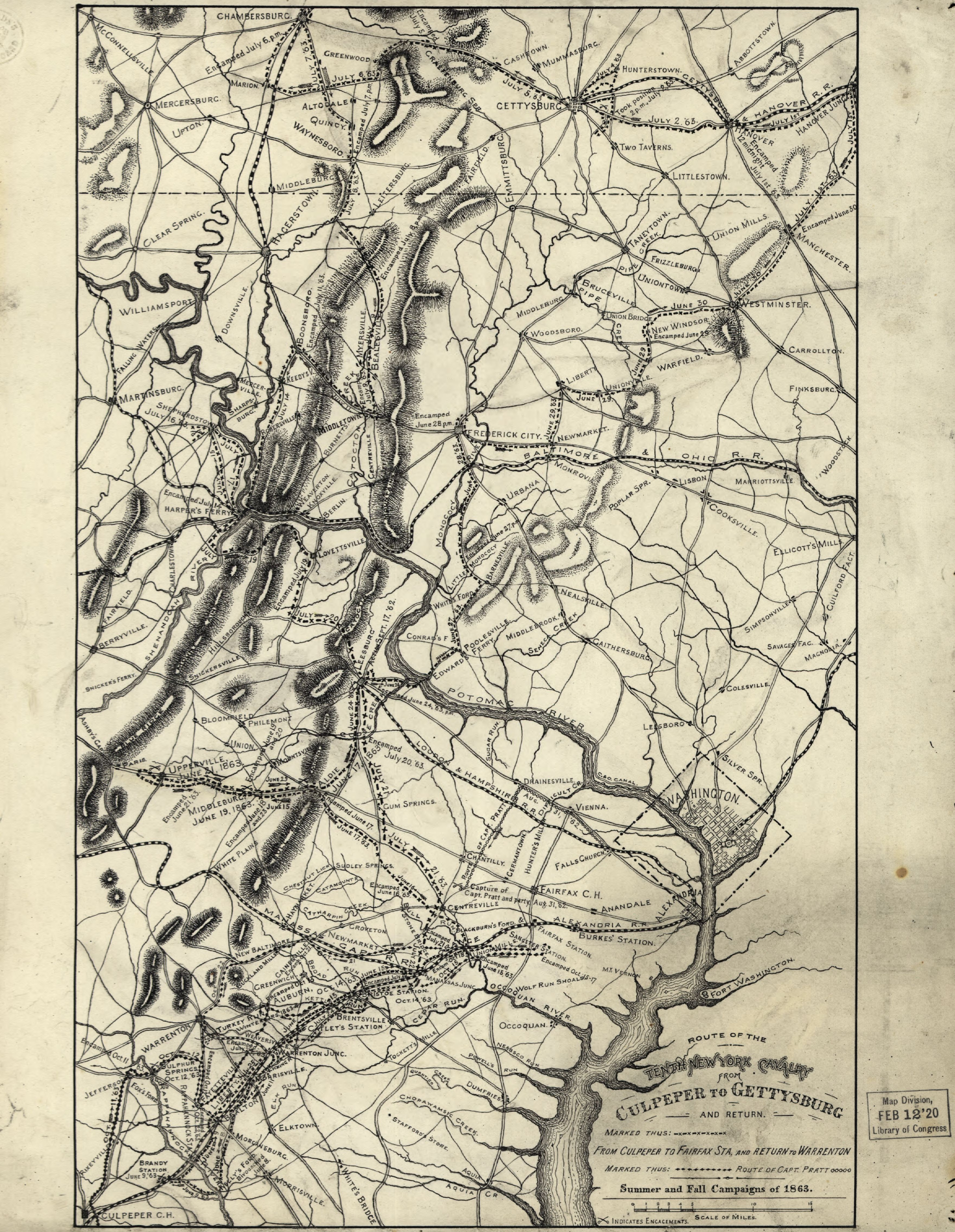
Route of the Tenth New York Cavalry from Culpeper to Gettysburg and return. Summer and fall campaigns of 1863

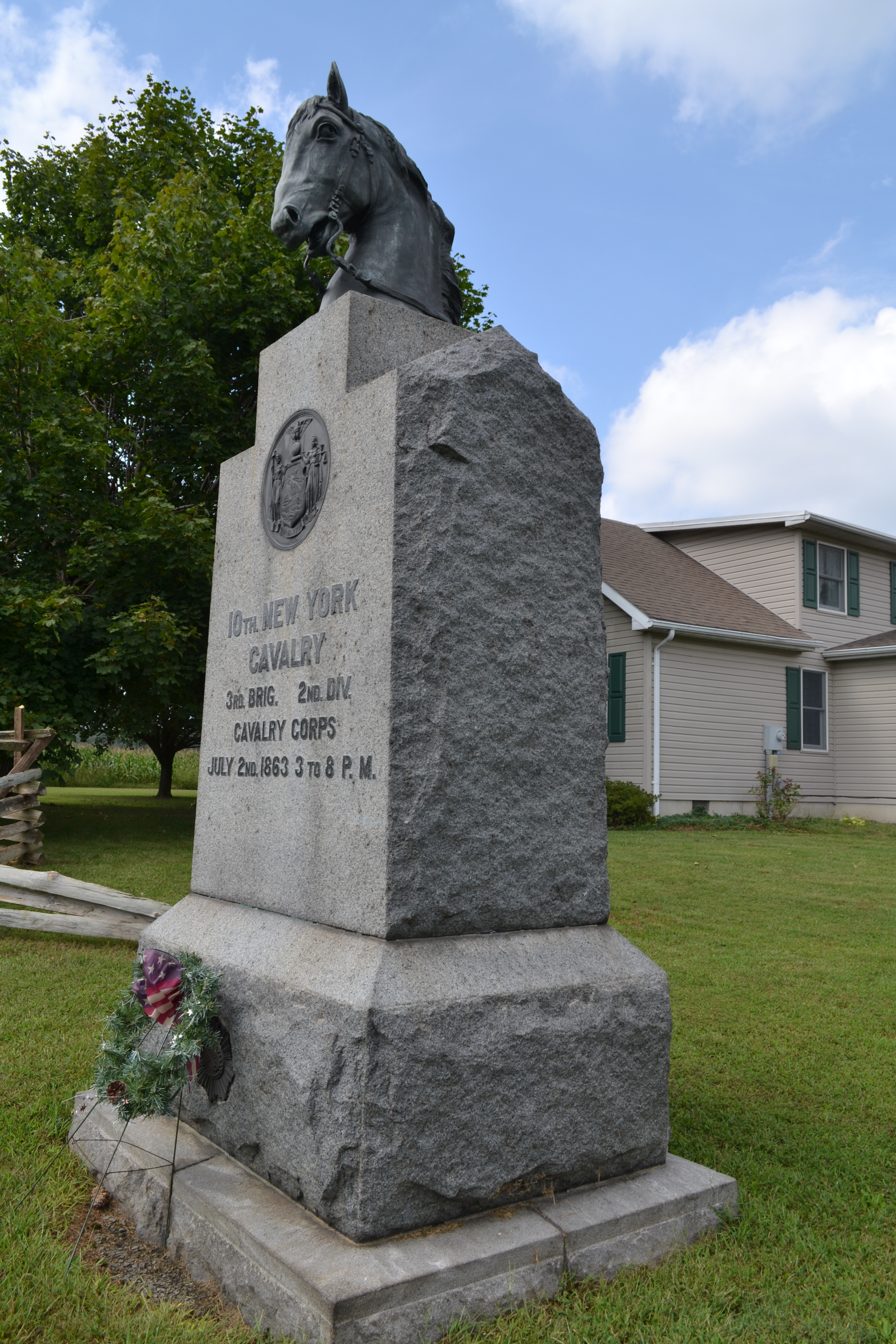
10th New York Cavalry monument at Gettysburg

The 10th New York Cavalry Regiment ("Porter Guard") was a cavalry regiment that served in the Union Army during the American Civil War.

== Service ==
The 10th New York Cavalry was organized in Elmira, New York beginning in August 1861 and mustered in September 27, 1861, under the command of Major Mathew Henry Avery.

The regiment was attached to Bayard's Cavalry Brigade, Army of Virginia, August–September 1862. Bayard's Brigade, Cavalry Division, Army of the Potomac, to January 1863. 1st Brigade, 3rd Division, Cavalry Corps, Army of the Potomac, to June 1863. 2nd Brigade, 2nd Division, Cavalry Corps, June 1863. 3rd Brigade, 2nd Division, Cavalry Corps, to August 1863. 2nd Brigade, 2nd Division, Cavalry Corps, to May 1864. 1st Brigade, 2nd Division, Cavalry Corps, to June 1865.

The 10th New York Cavalry ceased to exist on June 17, 1865, when it was consolidated with the 24th New York Cavalry to form the 1st Regiment New York Provisional Cavalry.

== Detailed service ==
Moved to Gettysburg, Pennsylvania, December 24, and duty there until March 1862. Duty at Havre de Grace and Baltimore, Maryland, Middle Department and in the defenses of Washington, D.C., until August 1862. Sulphur Springs, Virginia, August 27, 1862. Near Frying Pan August 27. Reconnaissance to Dranesville, Herndon Station, and Frying Pan August 31. Near Centreville September 3. Reconnaissance to Leesburg October 16–17. Aldie and Mountsville October 31. Rappahannock Station November 1. New Baltimore November 4. Rappahannock Station November 7, 8, and 9. United States Ford November 16 (Company H). Battle of Fredericksburg December 12–15. Occoquan, Dumfries, December 19. "Mud March" January 20–24, 1863. Hartwood Church February 25. Rappahannock Railroad Bridge April 14. Stoneman's Raid toward Richmond April 27-May 8. Kelly's Ford April 30. Rapidan Station May 1. Louisa Court House May 2, South Anna Bridge May 3. Ashland Church May 4. Thompson's Cross Roads May 4. Brandy Station and Beverly Ford June 9. Aldie June 17. Middleburg June 18, 19 and 20. Upperville June 21. Aldie June 22. Gettysburg July 1–3. Fairfield, Pa., July 5. Hagerstown, Md., July 11. Boonsboro July 11–12. Near Harpers Ferry July 14. Shephardstown July 14 and 16. Halltown July 15. Near Amissville August 4. Little Washington August 5. Advance from the Rappahannock to the Rapidan September 13–17. Culpeper Court House September 13. Bristoe Campaign October 9–22. Near Warrenton October 11. Warrenton or White Sulphur Springs October 12–13. Auburn and St. Stephen's Church October 14. Catlett's Station October 15–16. Rappahannock Station October 24. Philomont November 1. Advance to line of the Rappahannock November 7–8. Mine Run Campaign November 26-December 2. New Hope Church November 27. Parker's Store November 29. Expedition to Luray December 21–23. Rapidan Campaign May–June 1864. Near Chancellorsville May 4. Todd's Tavern May 5–6. Wilderness May 6–7. Todd's Tavern May 7–8. Spotsylvania May 8. Sheridan's Raid to the James River May 9–24. North Anna River May 9–10. Ground Squirrel Church and Yellow Tavern May 11. Glen Allen May 11. Fortifications of Richmond May 12. Jones Bridge May 17. Haxall's Landing May 18. On line of the Pamunkey May 26–28. Totopotomoy May 28–31. Hanovertown and Haw's Shop May 28. Old Church Tavern May 30. Cold Harbor May 31-June 1. Barker's and Gaines Mills June 2. Bottom's Bridge June 3. Sheridan's Trevillian Raid June 7–24. Trevillian Station June 11–12. Malvern Hill June 16. Kings and Queens Court House June 18. White House or St. Peter's Church and Black Creek or Tunstall Station June 21. Samaria Church June 24. Before Petersburg June 26, 1864, to April 2, 1865. Ream's Station June 30, 1864. Light House Point July 1. Gaines Hill July 2. Prince George Court House July 10 and 16. Lee's Mills July 12. Deep Bottom July 27–28. Malvern Hill July 28. Lee's Mills July 30. Demonstration north of the James August 13–20. Gravel Hill August 14. Strawberry Plains August 14–18. Weldon Railroad August 19–21. Dinwiddie Road, near Ream's Station, August 23. Ream's Station August 25. Arthur's Swamp August 29–30. Yellow Tavern September 2. Stony Creek Station September 16. Belcher's Mills September 17. Poplar Springs Church, Peeble's Farm, September 29-October 2. Vaughan Road September 30-October 1. Duncan Road October 1. Boydton Plank Road, Hatcher's Run, October 27–28. Near Prince George Court House November 2. Reconnaissance to Stony Creek November 7. Blackwater Creek November 18. Stony Creek December 1. Hicksford Raid December 6–12. Bellefield December 9–10. Jarrett's Station December 10. Dabney's Mills, Hatcher's Run, February 5–7, 1865. Appomattox Campaign March 28- April 9. Dinwiddie Court House March 30–31. Five Forks April 1. Fall of Petersburg April 2. Payne's Cross Roads and Amelia Springs April 5. Deatonville Road and Sailor's Creek April 6. Farmville April 7. Appomattox Station April 8. Appomattox Court House April 9. Surrender of Lee and his army. Expedition to Danville April 23–29. Moved to Washington, D.C. May. Grand Review of the Armies May 23.

== Casualties ==
The regiment lost a total of 251 men during service; 9 officers and 93 enlisted men killed or mortally wounded, 1 officer and 148 enlisted men died of disease.

== Commanders ==
- Colonel Mathew Henry Avery - commanded the regiment for nearly all of its term of service at the rank of major
- Lieutenant Colonel William Irvine

== Notable members ==
- Corporal Andrew Bringle, Company F - Medal of Honor recipient for action at the Battle of Sailor's Creek
- Sergeant James L. Carey, Company G - Medal of Honor recipient for action at the Battle of Appomattox Court House
- Bugler Herbert E. Farnsworth - Medal of Honor recipient for action at the Battle of Trevilian Station

== See also ==
- List of New York Civil War regiments
- New York in the American Civil War
