= VFA-94 =

Strike Fighter Squadron 94
- VFA-94 Insignia
- Active: 26 March 1952 – present
- Country: United States
- Branch: United States Navy
- Type: Fighter/Attack
- Role: Close air support Air interdiction Aerial reconnaissance
- Part of: Carrier Air Wing Seventeen
- Garrison/HQ: NAS Lemoore
- Nickname: "Mighty Shrikes"
- Colors: Black/orange
- Engagements: Vietnam War; Operation Earnest Will; Operation Praying Mantis; Operation Classic Resolve; Operation Southern Watch; Operation Restore Hope; Operation Desert Fox; Operation Enduring Freedom; Iraq War; Operation Inherent Resolve; Operation Octave Quartz

Commanders
- Commanding Officer: CMD. Mike Campbell
- Executive Officer: CMD. Randy "JP" Conant
- Command Master Chief: CMDCM. Puni Alefaio

Aircraft flown
- Attack: A-4 Skyhawk; A-7 Corsair II
- Fighter: Vought F4U-4 Corsair; F9F-5 Panther; FJ-3M Fury; F9F Cougar; F/A-18 Hornet; F/A-18F Super Hornet; F/A-18E Super Hornet

Strike Fighter Squadron 94 (VFA-94), also known as the Mighty Shrikes, is a United States Navy fighter squadron stationed at Naval Air Station Lemoore. It is an operational fleet squadron currently flying the F/A-18F Super Hornet. It is attached to Carrier Air Wing 17 (CVW 17) and based at NAS Lemoore, California. Its tail code is "NA" and its radio call sign is "Hobo".

== Insignia and nickname ==
The original squadron was known as the Tough Kitties and had a cartoon cat insignia. When the second squadron was formed and deployed aboard USS Hornet during its world cruise in 1954, it also used a cartoon cat insignia. There is no record of this insignia being officially approved for use by the squadron. The squadron’s first official insignia was approved by Chief of Naval Operations on 21 November 1955, and consisted of a yellow and black tiger paw with lightning bolts on a blue background. A new insignia was approved on 21 April 1959 consisting of a dark blue stylized aircraft with above an atom symbol on a blue background. A modification to this insignia was approved on 16 May 1967, replacing the atom symbol by a stylized bird design. The stylized bird was orange and the other colors from the previous design stayed the same.

Nicknamed the Mighty Shrikes, the squadron was named after a small carnivorous bird of prey, the loggerhead shrike. It engages in aerial combat to strike its prey in the air and on the ground, and then impales its victim on a sharp thorn.

== History ==
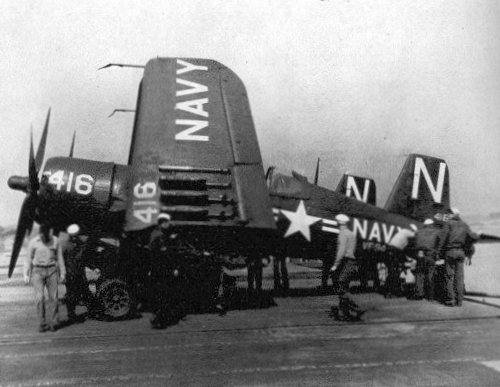
VF-94 F4U-4 Corsair on USS Philippine Sea in 1953

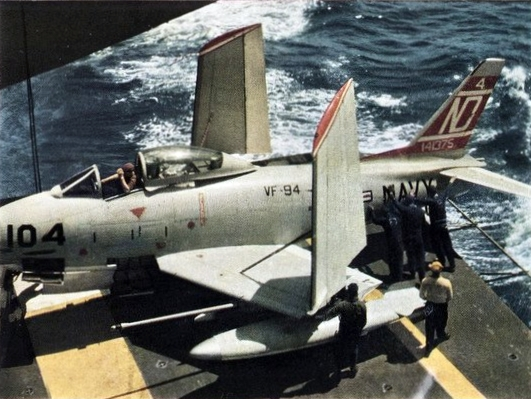
VF-94 FJ-3M Fury on USS Hornet in 1958

Two distinct US Navy squadrons have held the designation VA-94. The first VA-94 served in World War II and was disestablished on 30 November 1949. The second VA-94 later became VFA-94, the main subject of this article. Officially, the US Navy does not recognize a direct lineage of newly formed squadrons with disestablished squadrons. Often however, the new squadron will assume the nickname, insignia, and traditions of the earlier squadrons. That appears to have happened in this case, as (for a short time) the new squadron used a cat insignia similar to the earlier one.

=== 1950s ===
Fighter Squadron 94 (VF-94) was established at NAS Alameda, California on 26 March 1952. The squadron began flying the Vought F4U Corsair, but quickly transitioned to jet aircraft. Over the next eight years, the squadron received and flew numerous fighter aircraft before becoming an attack squadron. In September 1953, the squadron received the F9F-5 Panther. In January 1955 the squadron moved to NAS Moffett Field and received the FJ-3M Fury in February 1955. In November 1955, it transitioned to the F9F Cougar. It again flew various models of the FJ-3 Fury from June 1957 until 1959.

The squadron was redesignated as Attack Squadron 94 (VA-94) on 1 August 1958 and moved back to NAS Alameda on 20 August 1958. In January 1959, it transitioned to the aircraft it would fly (in various models) for the next twelve years, the A-4 Skyhawk.

=== 1960s ===
On 8 March 1962, VA-94 moved to NAS Lemoore, California. As the Vietnam War escalated, the squadron completed seven consecutive combat deployments to Southeast Asia, commencing with a cruise aboard USS Ranger in 1962.

On 1 December 1963, the squadron flew its first sorties in support of Yankee Team Operations, armed escort for photo-reconnaissance missions over Laos. On 7 February 1965, following a Viet Cong attack against American advisors in South Vietnam, President Lyndon Johnson ordered a reprisal strike against North Vietnam, named Flaming Dart I. The squadron’s target was concealed by heavy weather and the mission was aborted. On 11 February, the squadron participated in Flaming Dart II, retaliatory strikes against the Chanh Hoa military barracks near Dong Hoi, North Vietnam. In March 1965, the squadron participated in Rolling Thunder strikes against targets in North Vietnam.

In October 1965, as part of Air Wing 9, the squadron moved to NAS Norfolk to join USS Enterprise on her first combat cruise. The squadron was assigned to Air Wing 5 in 1966 and completed four combat deployments aboard USS Hancock and USS Bon Homme Richard.

=== 1970s ===
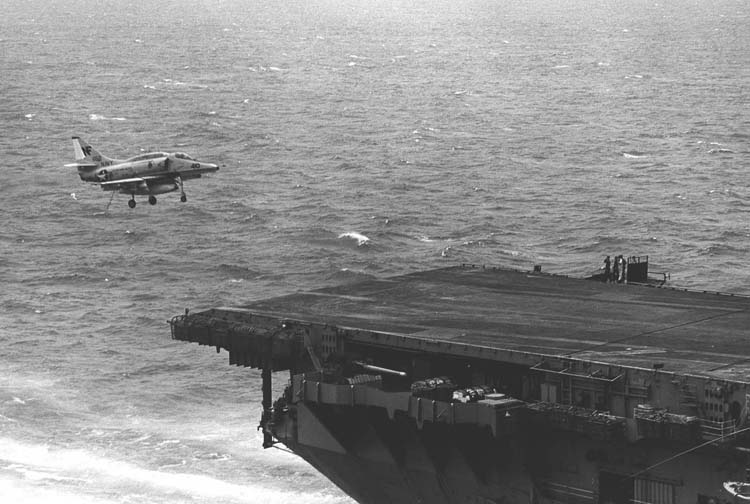
VA-94 A-4E landing on USS Bon Homme Richard in 1970

In February 1971, the squadron transitioned to the A-7 Corsair II and was assigned to Air Wing 15/USS Coral Sea.

From May–June 1972, VA-94 participated in Operation Linebacker, heavy air strikes against targets in North Vietnam. On 9 May 1972, the squadron participated in Operation Pocket Money, the mining of Haiphong harbor. The first mine was dropped at 08:59 to coincide with President Richard Nixon's public announcement of the mining. All mines were set with 72-hour arming delays, thus permitting merchant ships time for departure or a change in destination consistent with the President's public warning. It was the beginning of a mining campaign that planted over 11,000 MK36 type destructor and 108 special Mk 52-2 mines over the next eight months.

In 1973, the squadron deployed on its first peacetime cruise in a decade, again with Carrier Air Wing 15 aboard USS Coral Sea.

On 29 April 1975, squadron aircraft provided air cover for Operation Frequent Wind, the evacuation of American citizens from Saigon that terminated United States military involvement in Vietnam. On 15 May 1975, squadron aircraft, along with other elements from CVW-15 launched air strikes against the Cambodian mainland after the capture of the SS Mayaguez by Khmer Rouge gunboats.

From May 1979 to January 1980, the squadron deployed aboard USS Kitty Hawk to the Western Pacific and Indian Oceans, including 63 days of operations in the Arabian Sea during the Iran Hostage Crisis.

=== 1980s ===
The squadron's next deployment aboard USS Kitty Hawk was completed in 1981.

In 1986, aboard USS Enterprise, VA-94 made history as part of the first nuclear aircraft carrier to transit the Suez Canal and then cruised the Mediterranean for three months, supporting operations against Libya.

From February to May 1988, the squadron flew air support for Operation Earnest Will, escorting reflagged Kuwaiti oil tankers in the Persian Gulf. In April 1988, the squadron struck the naval forces of Iran as part of Operation Praying Mantis, the first major U.S. naval battle since World War II. Squadron aircraft delivered direct hits on the Iranian frigate Sahand.

In December 1989, the squadron participated in Operation Classic Resolve, providing support for the Philippine government during a coup attempt.

=== 1990s ===
In June 1990, the squadron received its first F/A-18C Hornet and was redesignated Strike Fighter Squadron 94 (VFA-94) on 1 January 1991. In May 1991, it deployed aboard USS Abraham Lincoln to the Persian Gulf in support of United Nations sanctions following the war in Iraq. The squadron also participated in Operation Fiery Vigil, evacuating thousands of homeless people from the Philippines after the Mount Pinatubo eruption. It subsequently received the Joint Meritorious Unit Commendation for its contribution to the disaster relief efforts.

On 15 June 1993, the squadron deployed aboard USS Abraham Lincoln flying missions over southern Iraq in support of Operation Southern Watch. In October 1993, USS Abraham Lincoln left the Persian Gulf for Somalia to provide force protection for U.S. and other United Nations forces aiding in the humanitarian relief effort. VFA-94 earned the coveted Battle "E" Award designating it as the Navy's top FA-18 squadron in 1994.

The squadron participated in Operation Vigilant Sentinel during its 1995 deployment, again aboard the USS Abraham Lincoln.

The squadron next deployed aboard USS Kitty Hawk on 10 October 1996 to the Persian Gulf in support of Operation Southern Watch.

On 10 November 1998 the squadron deployed to the Persian Gulf aboard USS Carl Vinson in support of Operation Desert Fox.

=== 2000s ===
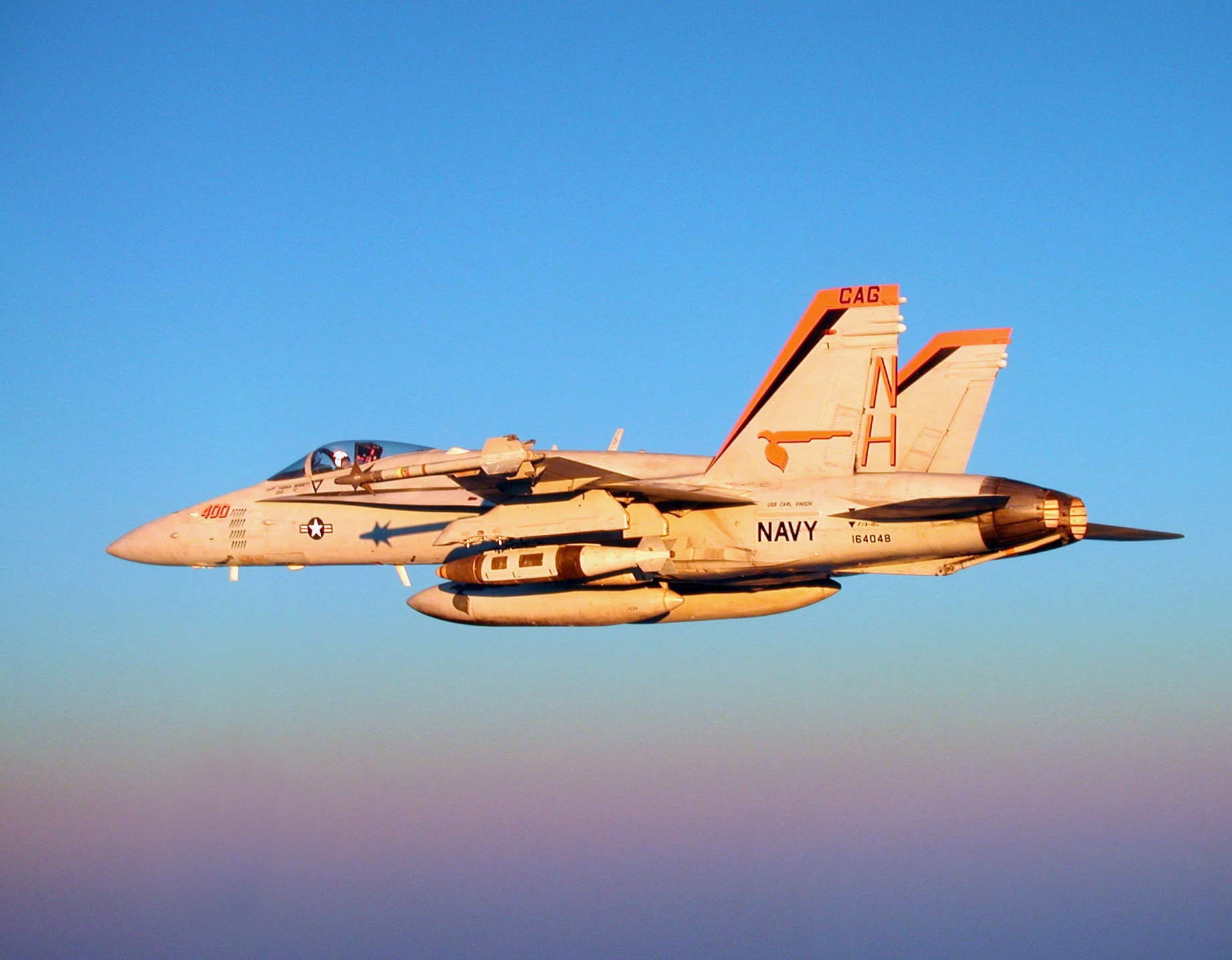
VFA-94 F/A-18C during Operation Enduring Freedom

Following the September 11 attacks, the squadron led the first missions of Operation Enduring Freedom on 7 October 2001. In the months that followed, VFA-94 and Air Wing Eleven participated in precision strikes against key Taliban locations in Afghanistan. The squadron amassed 664 combat sorties and expended 550,000 pounds of ordnance on targets in Afghanistan. The squadron returned home on 19 January 2002.

The squadron deployed again on 3 March 2003 for an eight-month combat deployment aboard USS Nimitz with CVW-11 in support of Operation Iraqi Freedom. On 7 May 2005, the squadron again deployed aboard USS Nimitz to the Persian Gulf in support of Operation Iraqi Freedom.

In October 2006, the squadron successfully completed the Strike Fighter Advanced Readiness Program, in preparation for the squadron's transition to an expeditionary role. In January 2007, VFA-94 joined its sister squadron VFA-97 as one of only two F/A-18 squadrons to deploy overseas as part of the Unit Deployment Program (UDP). VFA-94 departed NAS Lemoore on its first expeditionary evolution to MCAS Iwakuni, Japan. The squadron traversed nearly 7,000 nautical miles (13,000 km) of open ocean, totaling almost 18 flight hours per jet. During the deployment, VFA-94 participated in Exercise Foal Eagle, the first ever U.S. Navy expeditionary deployment to Korea and Exercise Cobra Gold in Thailand.

In July 2008, VFA-94 completed its second UDP deployment to Japan in support of the Global War on Terror and Pacific Operations. The squadron participated in Exercises Talon Vision at Clark Air Base, Philippines; Wolmi-Do Fury at Kadena Air Base, Okinawa and Exercise Lava Viper at Hickam AFB, Hawaii. The squadron returned home in February 2009 after completing this successful 7-month deployment.

The squadron has been awarded two Joint Meritorious Unit Awards, five Navy Unit Commendations, five Meritorious Unit Commendations, five Battle Efficiency Awards, two Navy Expeditionary Medals, three Armed Forces Expeditionary Medals, and Global War on Terrorism Expeditionary Medal and a Global War on Terrorism Service Medal.

=== 2010s ===
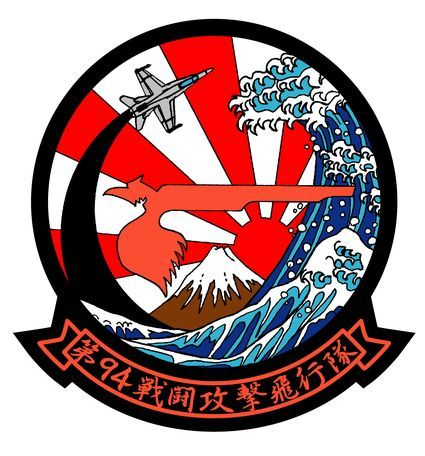
A patch of Strike Fighter Squadron 94 on its first Unit Deployment Program evolution to Marine Corps Air Station Iwakuni, Japan. Note the additional Japanese art elements.

In January 2012, after returning from UDP duties in Japan, the squadron returned to NAS Lemoore, but apparently was not assigned to one of the West Coast air wings until around August 2012, as it temporarily took sister squadron VFA-25's place within CVW-17. VFA-25 was returned to its former slot within CVW-17, thus replacing VFA-94.

On 12 September 2014, two F/A-18Cs, one from VFA-94 and the other from VFA-113 collided and crashed approximately 250 nautical miles (460 km; 290 mi) west of Wake Island. One aviator was recovered in fair condition and received medical treatment aboard the Carl Vinson. Search-and-rescue (SAR) operations continued for the other aviator. The Carl Vinson was participating in Exercise Valiant Shield 2014 at the time of the mid-air collision. The search was called off on 14 September 2014, and the missing aviator was declared missing and presumed dead, with the crash incident under investigation.

The Mighty Shrikes began its transition from the F/A-18C Hornet to the F/A-18F Super Hornet in September 2015, completing the transition in March 2016.

=== 2020s ===
VFA-94 currently flies the F/A-18E Block III Super Hornet.

According to the US Navy 2025 Budget Estimates VFA-94 will receive its first F-35C in FY 2025. However, this has not occurred yet, although subsequent budget documents from FY'26 and '27 mention VFA-94 as receiving F-35C equipment.

== See also ==
- List of Inactive United States Navy aircraft squadrons
- List of United States Navy aircraft squadrons
- Modern US Navy carrier air operations
- Naval aviation
