= Carrier Air Wing Seventeen =

United States Navy aviation wing

- Active: 1 November 1966 – Present
- Country: United States
- Branch: United States Navy
- Type: Carrier Air Wing
- Part of: Carrier Strike Group 11
- Garrison/HQ: NAS Lemoore; USS Ronald Reagan
- Tail Code: NA
- Engagements: Vietnam War; Achille Lauro hijacking Operation El Dorado Canyon; Operation Desert Shield; Operation Desert Storm; Operation Southern Watch; Operation Deny Flight; Operation Enduring Freedom; Operation Iraqi Freedom; Operation Inherent Resolve

Commanders
- Commander: CAPT Brent Jaquith
- Deputy Commander: CAPT Joshua M. Ales
- Command Master Chief: CMDCM. Virginia L. Horton

Carrier Air Wing Seventeen (CVW-17), is a United States Navy aircraft carrier air wing based at Naval Air Station Lemoore, California. The air wing is attached to the aircraft carrier USS Ronald Reagan.

== Mission ==
To conduct carrier air warfare operations and assist in the planning, control, coordination and integration of eight air wing squadrons and one detachment in support of carrier air warfare including; Interception and destruction of enemy aircraft and missiles in all-weather conditions to establish and maintain local air superiority. All-weather offensive air-to-surface attacks, Detection, localization, and destruction of enemy ships and submarines to establish and maintain local sea control. Aerial photographic, sighting, and electronic intelligence for naval and joint operations. Airborne early warning service to fleet forces and shore warning nets. Airborne electronic countermeasures. In-flight refueling operations to extend the range and the endurance of air wing aircraft and Search and rescue operations.

== Subordinate units ==
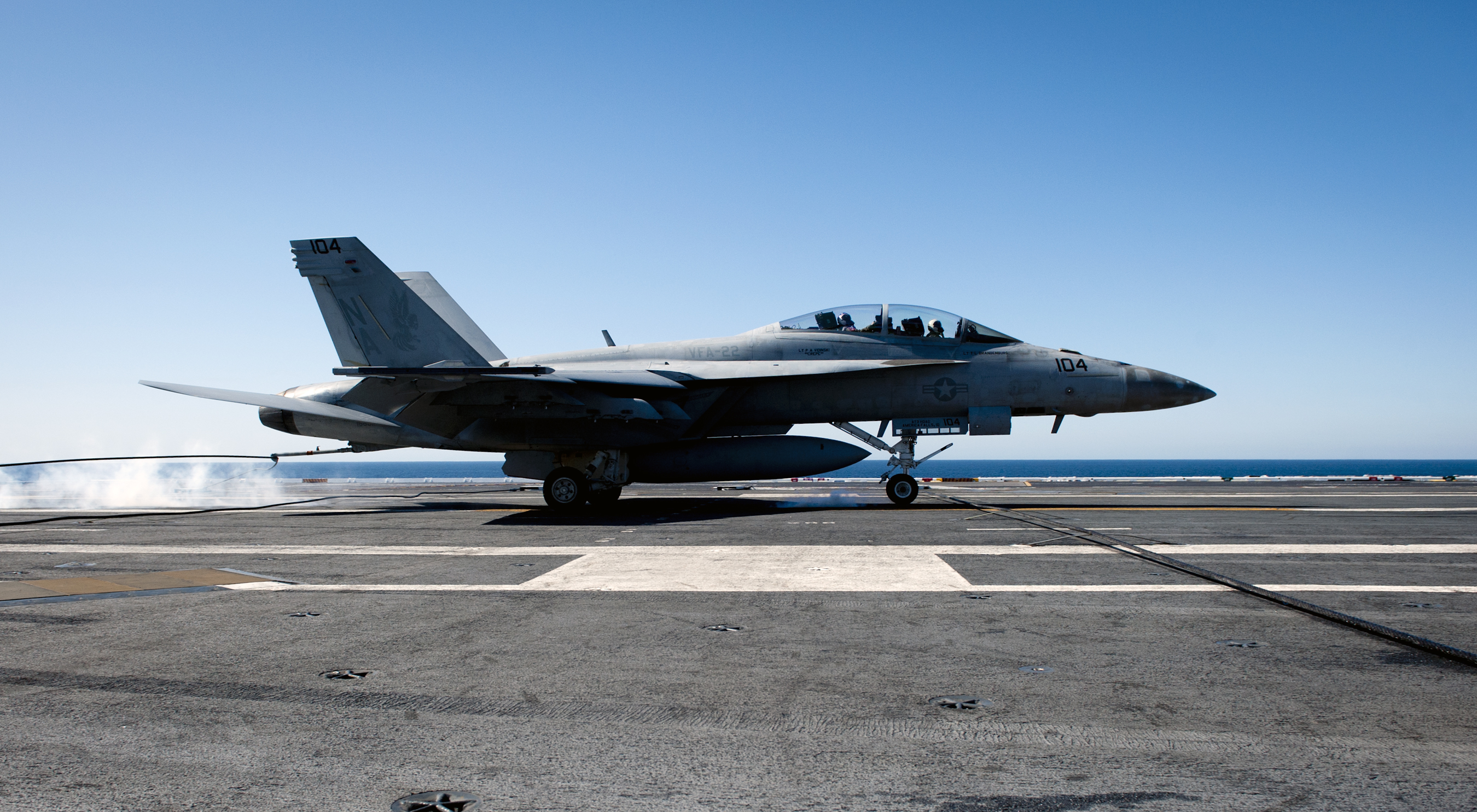
A VFA-22 F/A-18F Super Hornet displaying the new tail code "NA" in February 2013.

CVW-17 consists of eight squadrons and one detachment:

Code	Insignia	Squadron	Nickname	Assigned Aircraft
VFA-22		Strike Fighter Squadron 22	Fighting Redcocks	F/A-18F Super Hornet
VFA-94		Strike Fighter Squadron 94	Shrikes	F/A-18E Super Hornet
VFA-115		Strike Fighter Squadron 115	Eagles	F-35C Lightning II
VFA-146		Strike Fighter Squadron 146	Blue Diamonds	F/A-18E Super Hornet
VAW-121		Carrier Airborne Early Warning Squadron 121	Bluetails	E-2D Hawkeye
VAQ-139		Electronic Attack Squadron 139	Cougars	EA-18G Growler
HSC-6		Helicopter Sea Combat Squadron 6	Indians	MH-60S Seahawk
HSM-73		Helicopter Maritime Strike Squadron 73	Battlecats	MH-60R Seahawk
VRM-30		Fleet Logistics Multi-Mission Squadron 30 Detachment 1	Titans	CV-22 Osprey

== History ==
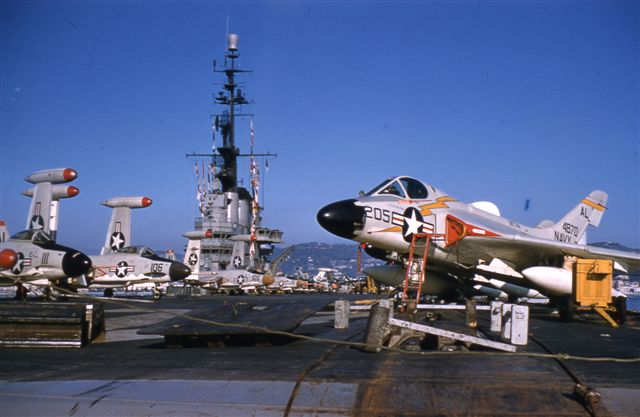
F4D-1s VF-74 USS Franklin D. Roosevelt.

=== 1960s ===
Carrier Air Wing Seventeen (CVW-17) was established on 1 November 1966 and assigned to USS Forrestal. Although an Atlantic Fleet carrier, Forrestal's first deployment with CVW-17 was to Vietnam, from June to September 1967. After only four days on the line with 150 sorties flown, a Zuni rocket was accidentally fired on the flight deck on the morning of 29 July 1967. It hit the fueled and armed aircraft. In the resulting fire 134 crewmembers were killed and 161 injured. 21 aircraft were destroyed and 40 were damaged.

=== 1970s ===
After a refit, Forrestal made eleven deployments to the Mediterranean Sea with CVW-17, the last in 1982. In 1974, CVW-17 guarded the evacuation of U.S. citizens during the Turkish invasion of Cyprus. In 1976, the U.S. President Gerald R. Ford commenced the celebrations of the United States Bicentennial aboard Forrestal.

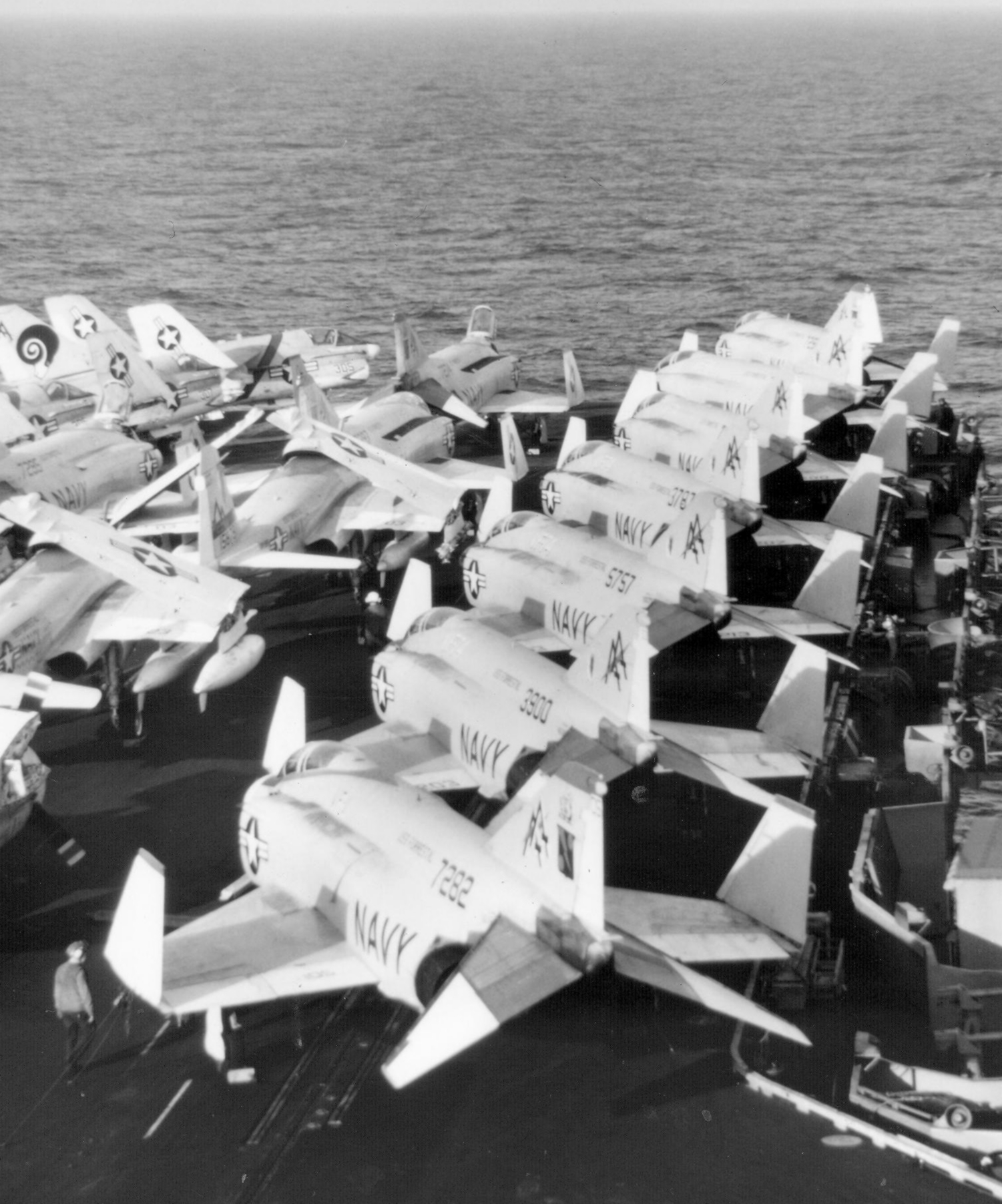
CVW-17 aircraft aboard Forrestal, 1974.

On 15 January 1978 Forrestal was operating 60 km off the Florida coastline, when an LTV A-7 Corsair II from VA-81 crashed during landing. The aircraft hit another A-7 and a Grumman EA-6 Prowler. Two crewmen were killed, 10 were wounded. In March 1981, CVW-17 was in the Mediterranean Sea, when two F-14A Tomcat fighters from Nimitz shot down two Libyan fighters.

=== 1980–1999 ===
When Forrestal entered a three-year Service Life Extension Program (SLEP) in November 1982, CVW-17 cross-decked to USS Saratoga and made six deployments aboard her until 1994. On 10 October 1985 F-14A Tomcats of VF-74 Be-Devilers and VF-103 Sluggers intercepted a Boeing 737 carrying terrorists, who had hijacked the Italian ocean liner MS Achille Lauro. The fighters forced the Boeing 737 to land at Naval Air Station Sigonella, Italy. In April 1986, aircraft of CVW-17 participated in Operation El Dorado Canyon, the bombing of Libya. CVW-17 joined forces with aircraft from the United States Air Force (USAF); Carrier Air Wing Thirteen from USS Coral Sea; and Carrier Air Wing One from USS America. In 1991, CVW-17 was taking part in Operation Desert Storm, flying missions for 43 consecutive days. CVW-17's aircraft dropped 1,800 tons of ordnance, but lost an F/A-18C Hornet from VFA-81, a F-14A Tomcat from VF-103, and an A-6E Intruder from VA-35. During Operations Desert Shield and Desert Storm, CVW-17 comprised the following squadrons: VAQ-132 Scorpions, VF-74 Be-Devilers, VF-103 Sluggers, HS-3 Tridents, VFA-81 Sunliners, VFA-83 Rampagers, VS-30 Diamondcutters, VAW-125 Tigertails, and VA-35 Black Panthers.

In 1988, CVW-17 operated for a few weeks from USS Independence, and from USS Constellation in 1993. In 1992, the Wing's aircraft took part in Operation Deny Flight and Operation Provide Promise in Yugoslavia, and in Operation Southern Watch over Iraq.

In June 1994 CVW-17 was transferred to USS Enterprise, homeported in Norfolk, Virginia. The following September, CVW-17 moved its headquarters to NAS Oceana, Virginia. Due to the BRAC closure of NAS Cecil Field.

In 1998 CVW-17 was deployed to the Mediterranean Sea aboard USS Dwight D. Eisenhower. Starting in 2000, the Wing then made four deployments (2000, 2001, 2002 and 2006) aboard USS George Washington. Only in 2004, CVW-17 joined USS John F. Kennedy for her final deployment before her decommissioning.

=== 2000 – present ===
In 2004, aircraft from the air wing played key roles in supporting ground forces during the Iraq War, especially the operations in Fallujah, that began 7 November. CVW-17 joined USAF and United States Marine Corps (USMC) aircraft in striking key positions. During the height of operations, CVW-17 aircraft flew an average of 38 missions a day in support of ground troops. Together, the squadrons of CVW-17 flew 8,296 sorties for a total flight time of 21,824 hours. Of that total, 4,396 sorties and 11,607 flight hours were in direct support of Operation Iraqi Freedom. In all, CVW-17 dropped 24,500 kg (54,000 lb) of ordnance. During these operations, VFA-34 dropped the U.S. Navy's first two 227 kg (500 lb) Joint Direct Attack Munitions over Iraq.

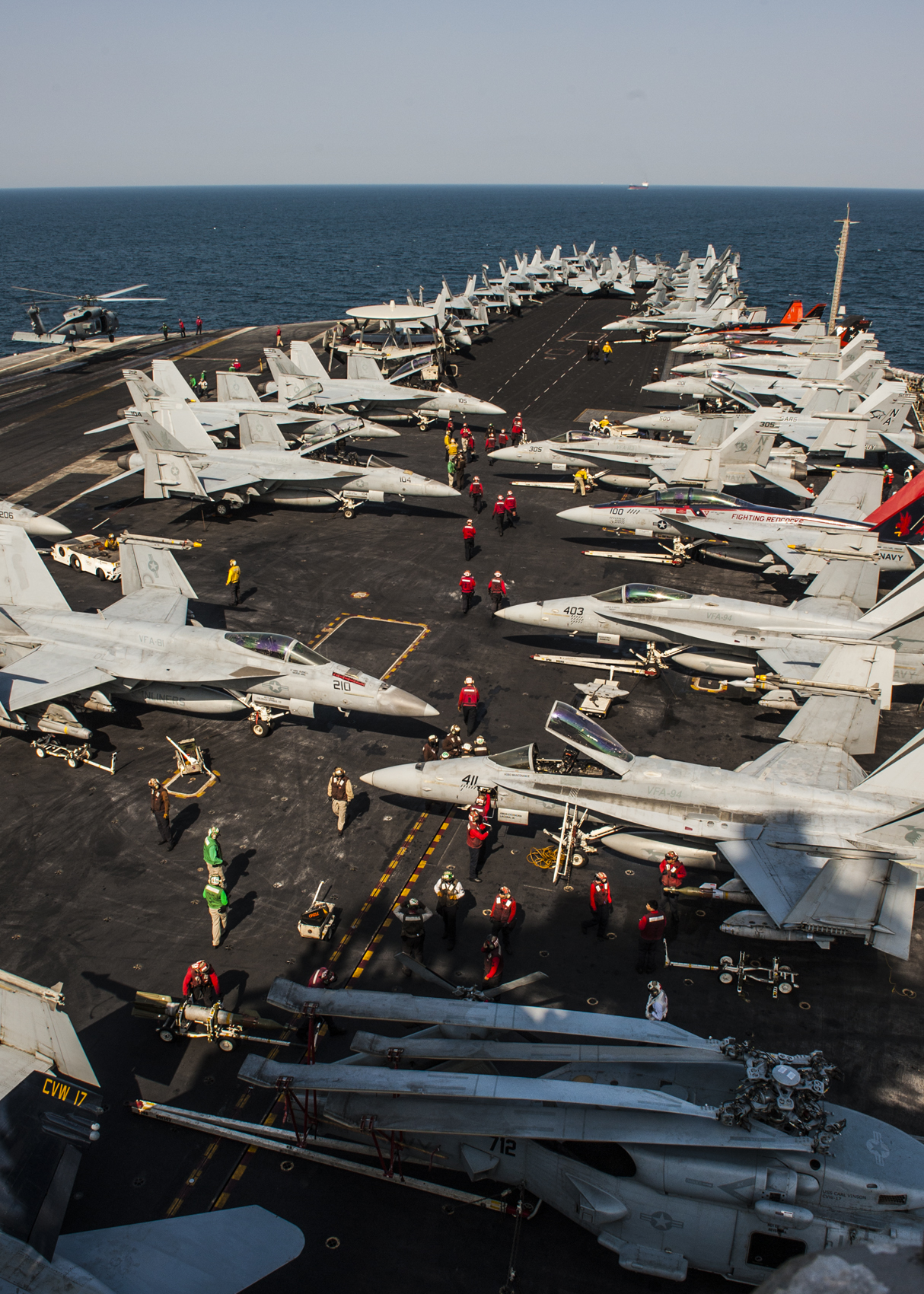
CVW-17 aboard Carl Vinson in March 2015

In 2008, CVW-17 accompanied George Washington from Norfolk, Virginia to San Diego, California, although all fighter squadrons came from CVW-7, these keeping their "AG" tail code. CVW-17 was then scheduled to be assigned to USS Carl Vinson, as part of Carrier Strike Group One, which underwent a Refueling and Complex Overhaul (RCOH) until July 2009.

From January to April 2010, Carl Vinson operated off Haiti, following the 2010 Haiti earthquake. CVW-17 mainly consisted of detachments of six helicopter squadrons which were active in humanitarian relief operations. CVW-17 began its first regular deployment on Carl Vinson to the Western Pacific and the Indian Ocean on 30 November 2010 and returned on 15 June 2011. CVW-17 completed a second deployment on Carl Vinson from November 2011 to May 2012. In October 2012, CVW-17 completed a home port change from NAS Oceana, VA to NAS Lemoore, California.

On 22 August 2014, Carl Vinson and CVW-17 began a scheduled deployment to the U.S. 5th and 7th Fleet areas of responsibility.

On 11 September 2014 at 17:40 hrs local time, two F/A-18Cs from CVW-17 crashed in the western Pacific Ocean whilst Carl Vinson was in her area of operations in the Indo-Asia-Pacific region. The planes where attached to Strike Squadron 94 and Strike Fighter Squadron 113 and collided 7 miles from the carrier, an area approximately 290 miles west of Wake Island. USS Bunker Hill, USS Gridley, and helicopters assigned to Helicopter Sea Combat Squadron 15 (HSC 15) and Helicopter Maritime Strike Squadron 73 (HSM 73) assisted in the search for the pilots. Whilst one pilot was recovered alive soon after the crash, the second pilot could not be located. The Navy continued its search for the second pilot until 13 September 2014, when the search was abandoned.

Carl Vinson returned to San Diego on 6 June 2015. Over the course of the deployment, supporting strike operations in Iraq and Syria, CVW-17 successfully flew 12,300 sorties, including 2,382 combat missions and dropped more than half a million pounds (230 tons) of ordnance against ISIS.

In 2016, CVW-17 was reassigned to USS Theodore Roosevelt.

In 2019, CVW-17 was reassigned to USS Nimitz.

In 2026, CVW-17 was reassigned to the USS Ronald Reagan.

== Current force ==
=== Fixed-wing aircraft ===
- F/A-18E/F Super Hornet
- F-35C Lightning II
- EA-18G Growler
- E-2D Hawkeye
- CMV-22B Osprey

=== Rotary wing aircraft ===
- MH-60S Knighthawk
- MH-60R Seahawk

== Carrier Air Group 17 ==
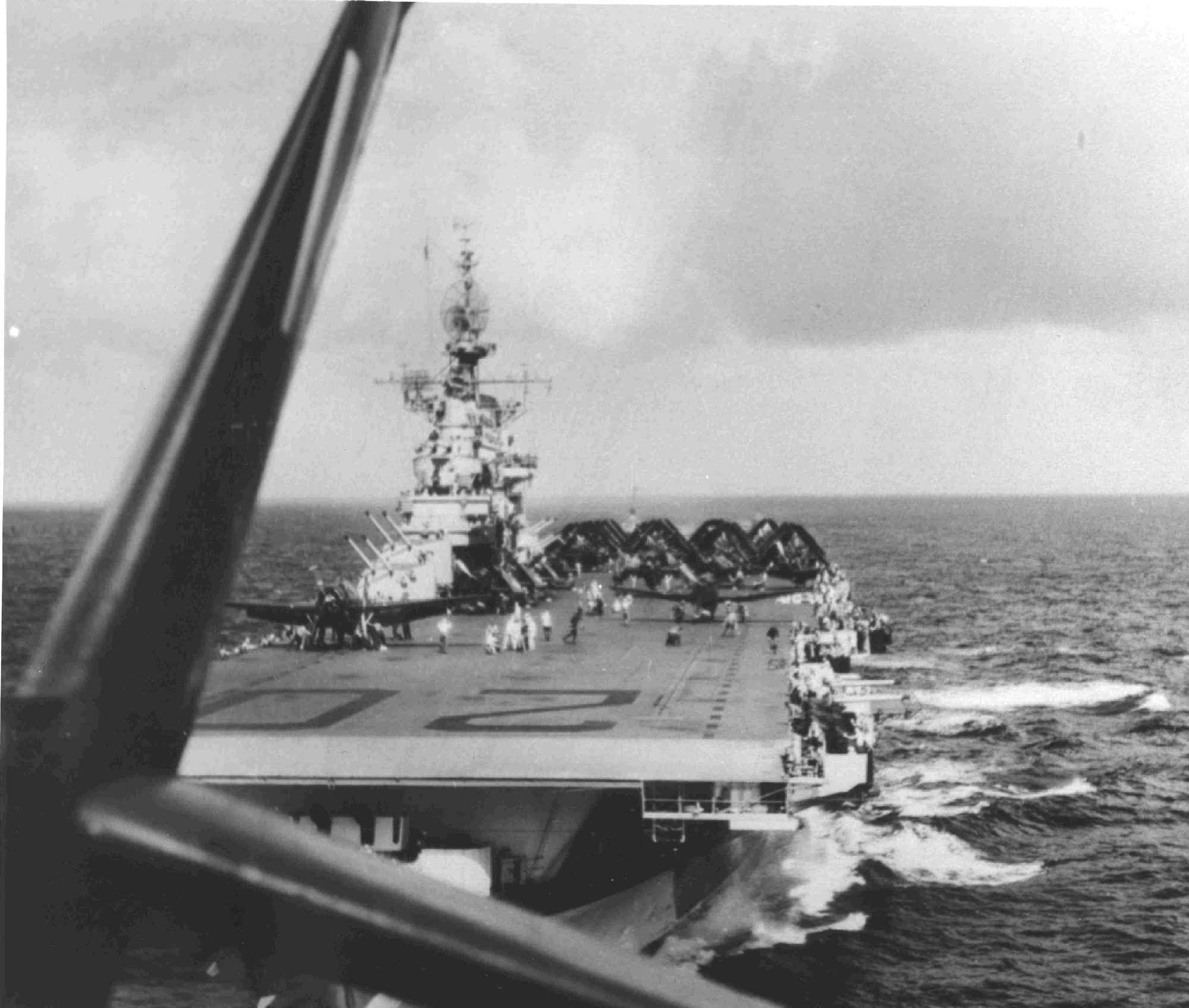
CVG-82 on USS Bennington, 1944.

There were two Carrier Air Groups designated Carrier Air Group SEVENTEEN (CVG-17). Neither group shares a lineage with CVW-17 as the first was the forerunner of CVW-6 and the second was disestablished eight years before CVW-17 was established.

== See also ==
- List of United States Navy Carrier air wings
- Carrier Strike Group One
- List of United States Navy aircraft wings
- Carrier Air Group SEVENTEEN
