= Andrew Bringle =

American soldier

- Born: Buffalo, New York
- Military career
- Allegiance: United States of America
- Branch: United States Army; Union Army
- Rank: Corporal
- Unit: (New York (state)) 10th Regiment New York Volunteer Cavalry - Company F
- Conflicts: Battle of Sailor's Creek
- Awards: Medal of Honor

Corporal Andrew Bringle was an American soldier who fought in the American Civil War. Bringle received the country's highest award for bravery during combat, the Medal of Honor, for his action during the Battle of Sailor's Creek in Virginia on 6 April 1865. He was honored with the award on 3 July 1865.

== Biography ==
Bringle's date of birth and death are unknown but he was born in Buffalo, New York. He enlisted into the 10th New York Cavalry.

== Medal of Honor citation ==
Charged the enemy and assisted Sgt. Norton in capturing a fieldpiece and 2 prisoners.

== See also ==
- List of American Civil War Medal of Honor recipients: A–F
