= Carrier Air Group Seventeen =

Carrier Air Group Seventeen (CVG-17) was a designation used by the United States Navy to identify two unrelated Carrier Air Groups; the first of which was established on 1 January 1943 as Carrier Air Group Seventeen and disestablished on 1 April 1992 as Carrier Air Wing Six; and the second of which was established as Carrier Air Group Eighty Two on 1 April 1944 and ultimately disestablished as Carrier Air Group Seventeen on 16 September 1968. Neither group shares a lineage with the current Carrier Air Wing Seventeen (CVW-17) as the first was the forerunner of CVW-6 and the second was disestablished eight years before CVW-17 was established.

== First Carrier Air Group designated CVG-17 ==
The first Carrier Air Group to carry the designation Carrier Air Group Seventeen (CVG-17) was established as CVG-17 on 1 January 1943 during WWII. That CVG was later redesignated CVBG-17, then CVBG-5, then CVG-6 (the second use of the CVG-6 designation) and ultimately CVW-6 before it was disestablished.

== Second Carrier Air Group designated CVG-17 ==
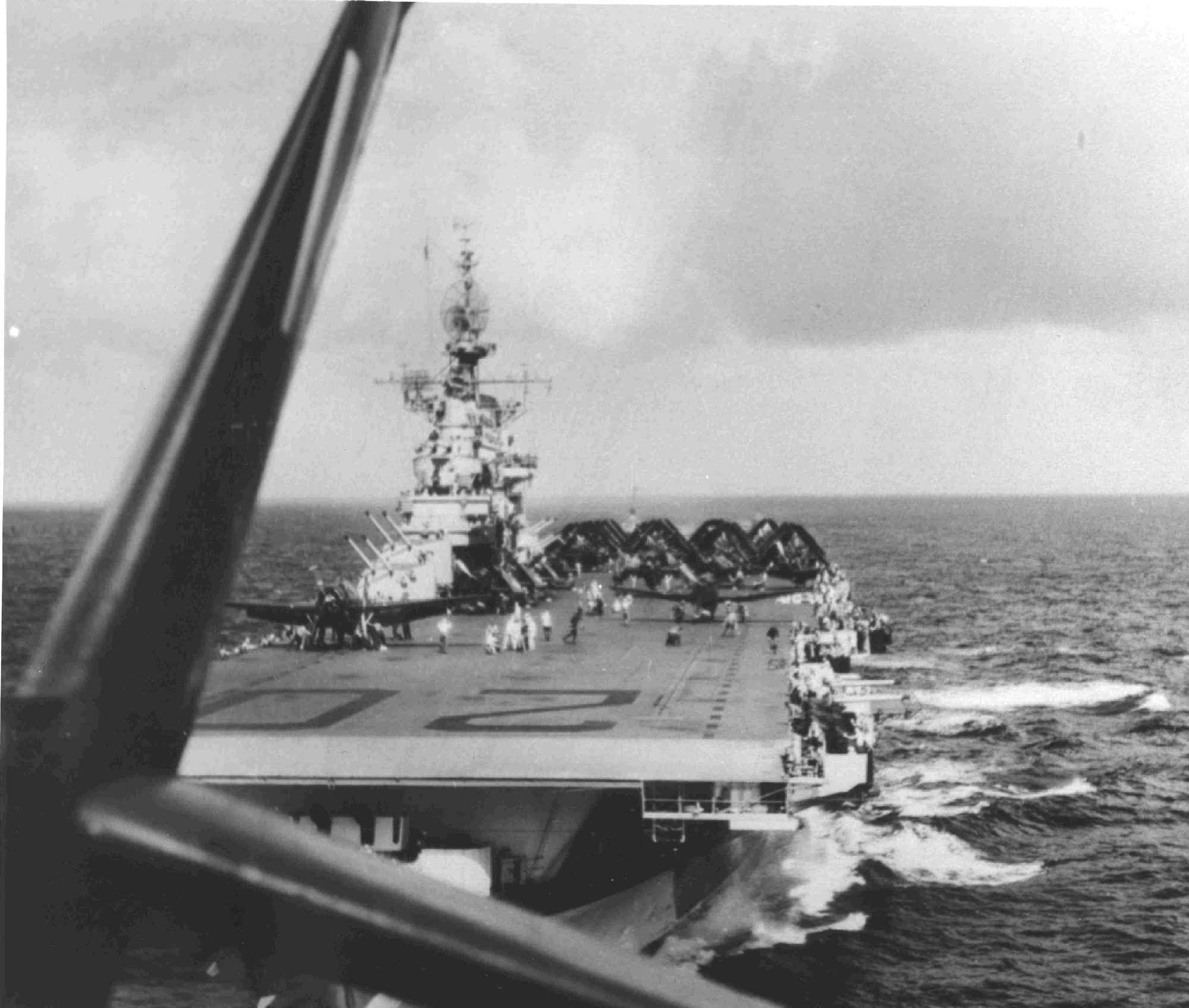
CVG-82 on USS Bennington, 1944.

=== CVG-82 ===
The Second Carrier Air Group to carry the CVG-17 designation was established as CVG-82 on 1 April 1944 during World War II and was assigned to the aircraft carrier USS Bennington (CV-20). CVG-82 consisted of Fighting Squadron 82, flying the Grumman F6F Hellcat, Bombing Squadron 82 (Curtiss SB2C Helldiver), Torpedo Squadron 82 (Grumman TBM Avenger) and the two USMC fighter squadrons VMF-112 and VMF-123 (Vought F4U Corsair). After training on the U.S. East Coast, Bennington reached the U.S. 5th Fleet on 7 February 1945. Nine days later. CVG-82 attacked targets in the Tokyo area, mainly the airfields at Nachijo Jima, Nanpo Shoto, Mikatagahara, and Hamamatsu. From 20 to 22 February, the wing supported the landings on Iwo Jima. This was followed by attacks on targets in the Japanese Inland Sea and on Okinawa in March. On 7 April, aircraft from CVG-82 participated in the sinking of the battleship Yamato. The Air Group then supported U.S. troops on Okinawa until June. On 17 June 1945, CVG-82 was replaced aboard Bennington by CVG-1, and was transported to the US aboard USS White Plains (CVE-66). During its deployment, CVG-82 was credited with the destruction of 167 Japanese aircraft in the air and 220 on the ground. However, CVG-82 lost 40 pilots and 13 crewmembers, 25% of its regular strength.

Following the war the Air Group was reassigned to the United States Atlantic Fleet. CVG-82 began its first deployment to the Atlantic Ocean area in October 1946 aboard Randolph.

=== CVAG-17 ===
On 15 November 1946 all then existing CVGs were redesignated according to a new designation scheme. Carrier Air Groups assigned to Essex class carriers were designated CVAGs and those assigned to the larger Midway class carrier were designated CVBGs. CVAGs were numbered sequential from 1 to 21 using only odd number and CVG-82 was redesignated "Attack Carrier Air Group Seventeen (CVAG-17)".

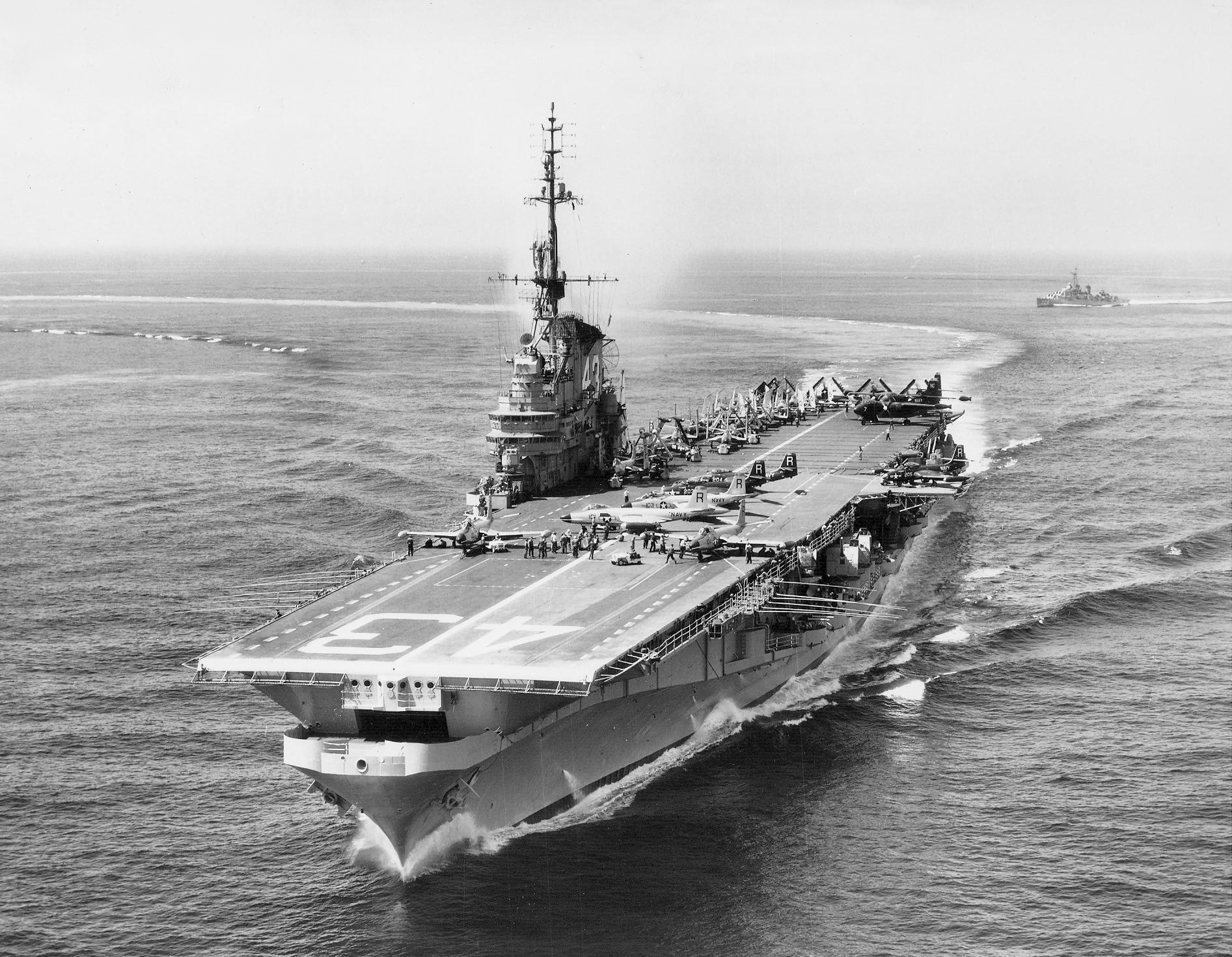
CVG-17 on USS Coral Sea

=== CVG-17 ===
Not long thereafter, on 1 September 1948, the Navy instituted yet another designation scheme eliminating the CVAG and CVBG designations and all existing Carrier Air Groups were redesignated to CVGs numbered sequentially beginning with . CVAG-17 became CVG-17 (the second use of the CVG-17 designation). Until 1953, CVG-17 made eight deployments to the Mediterranean Sea aboard Randolph, Midway, Franklin D. Roosevelt and Coral Sea. Between September 1953 and May 1954, CVG-17 circumnavigated the world aboard Wasp. In 1955 CVG-17 deployed again aboard Coral Sea, followed by three deployments with Franklin D. Roosevelt until March 1958. In November 1956, FDR and Forrestal were rushed to the Mediterranean Sea to join Randolph and Coral Sea during the Suez Crisis, to prevent any Soviet intervention. CVG-17 was disestablished on 16 September 1958.

== See also ==
- Carrier air wing
- List of United States Navy aircraft wings
