= VA-94 (U.S. Navy) =

Attack Squadron 94
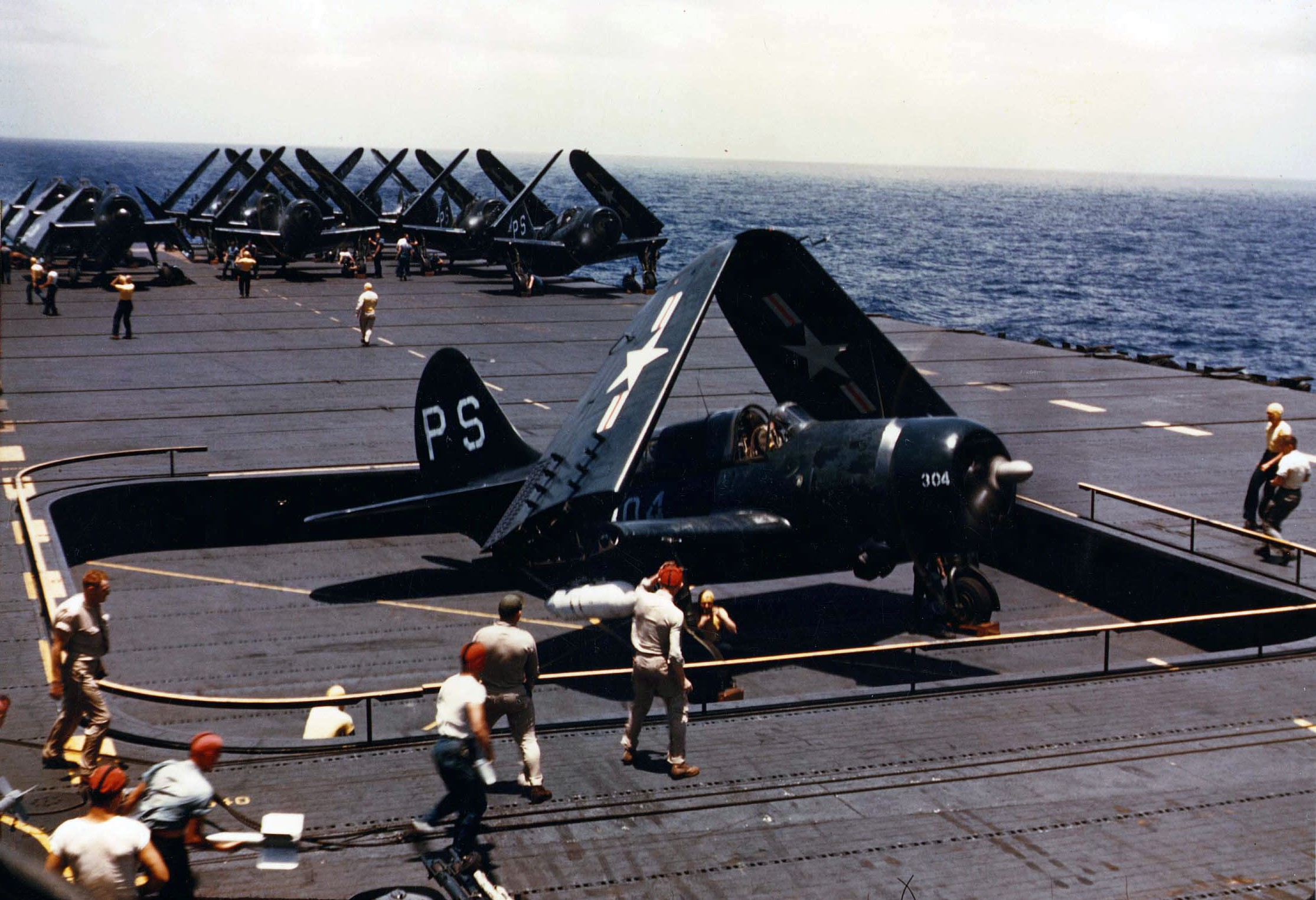
- VA-9A SB2C-5 Helldiver is lifted to the flight deck of USS Philippine Sea in preparation for launch in 1948
- Active: 1 July 1943 - 30 November 1949
- Country: United States
- Branch: United States Navy
- Type: Attack
- Nickname: Tough Kitties
- Engagements: World War II

Aircraft flown
- Attack: SBD-5 Dauntless; SB2C Helldiver; AD-2 Skyraider

VA-94 was an Attack Squadron of the U.S. Navy. It was established as Bombing Squadron VB-99 on 1 July 1943, redesignated as VB-20 on 15 October 1943, and as VA-9A on 15 November 1946. It was finally redesignated as VA-94 on 12 August 1948. The squadron was disestablished on 30 November 1949. Its nickname was Bombing Twenty's Tough Kitty from 1943 to 1946.

== Operational history ==
- July–October 1943: VB-99 was established as an experimental squadron for the new SB2C aircraft until its redesignation as VB-20 and assignment to Carrier Air Group 20 (CVG-20).
- 31 August 1944: The squadron's first combat action involved an attack on the Bonin Islands, Japan.
- September 1944: The squadron participated in pre-invasion strikes on Palau Islands and provided air support for the invasion of Peleliu.
- October 1944: Squadron aircraft participated in air strikes against Okinawa, Formosa and Luzon.
- 24 October 1944: The squadron participated in the Battle for Leyte Gulf. VB-20's SB2Cs flew sorties against a powerful Japanese surface force in the Sibuyan Sea. These attacks contributed to the sinking of the Japanese battleship Musashi, one of the two largest battleships in the world. The following squadron personnel were awarded the Navy Cross for this action: Ensigns M. E. Adams, R. J. Barnes, H. A. Koster, R. D. Olson, M. T. Ross, and D. D. J. Spanagel; Lieutenant (jg)s P. P. Cook, J. M. Glynn, R. D. Reed, J. P. Trytten, and J. E. Tsarnas; Lieutenants W. N. Christensen, J. S. Cooper, H. C. Hogan, R. E. Moore, R. D. Warner and R. S. Wilcox; and Commander R. E. Riera.
- 25 October 1944: Squadron aircraft were part of the Fast Carrier Task Force that attacked the Japanese carrier force in the Battle off Cape Engaño. Four Japanese carriers were sunk during this engagement. The following squadron personnel were awarded the Navy Cross for their actions during the Battle off Cape Engaño: Ensigns H. C. Bearden, D. F. Hughes, C. Z. Stevens III, and W. P. Wright; Lieutenant (jg) W. C. Pohtilla; Lieutenants W. W. Anderson, C. Burkhart and L. C. Flynt; and Commander R. E. Riera.
- November 1944: Squadron aircraft flew strikes against a Japanese troop convoy in Ormoc Bay, Leyte and enemy positions on Luzon.
- December 1944: The squadron participated in strikes flown against Luzon.
- January 1945: Squadron aircraft flew strikes against Luzon, Formosa, Hong Kong, and Japanese convoys in South China Sea and Okinawa.
- 12 January 1945: The following squadron personnel were awarded the Silver Star medal for action against a Japanese cruiser protecting a convoy of cargo ships: Lieutenants W. N. Christensen and W. W. Anderson and Lieutenant (jg) H. Rubner.

== Home port assignments ==
The squadron was assigned to these home ports, effective on the dates shown:

- NAS San Diego – 01 Jul 1943
- NAS Kaneohe – 21 Apr 1944*
- NAS Barbers Point – 30 Apr 1944*
- NAS Puunene – 17 Jun 1944*
- NAS San Diego – 23 Feb 1945
- NAS Wildwood – 16 Apr 1945
- NAAS Edenton – 22 Jun 1945
- NAAS Elizabeth City – 01 Nov 1945
- NAAS Charlestown – 01 Mar 1946

* Temporary shore assignment while the squadron conducted training in preparation for combat deployment.

== Aircraft assignment ==
The squadron first received the following aircraft on the dates shown:

- SBD-5 Dauntless – Jul 1943
- SB2C-1C Helldiver – 15 Nov 1943
- SB2C-3 Helldiver – Jul 1944
- SB2C-4E Helldiver – 18 Apr 1945
- SBW-5 Helldiver – 04 Aug 1945
- SB2C-5 Helldiver – Mar 1946
- AD-2 Skyraider – 04 Oct 1948

== See also ==
- Attack aircraft
- List of inactive United States Navy aircraft squadrons
- History of the United States Navy
