= Moodna =

Moodna may refer to:

- Moodna (moth), a genus of moth
- Moodna Creek, a tributary of the Hudson River in New York State
- Moodna Viaduct, spans the above creek
- USS Keokuk (1862), at one time known as Moodna
