= Charles J. Bibber =

American sailor who received the Medal of Honor

- Born: 1838; Portland, Maine
- Died: Unknown
- Military career
- Allegiance: United States of America
- Branch: United States Navy
- Service years: 1864–1866
- Rank: Gunner's mate
- Unit: (Maine)
- Conflicts: First Battle of Fort Fisher
- Awards: Medal of Honor

Gunner's Mate Charles J. Bibber (born 1838) was an American sailor who fought in the American Civil War. Bibber received the country's highest award for bravery during combat, the Medal of Honor, for his action during the First Battle of Fort Fisher aboard the USS Agawam on December 23, 1864.

== Biography ==
Bibber was born in Portland, Maine. He enlisted into the navy on 2 May 1864. Bibber was aboard the USS Agawam when it exploded near Fort Fisher on December 23, 1864. The crew skillfully assisted in towing the powder boat to shore before it was detected by the enemy. He received the Medal of Honor for his action during this event.

== Medal of Honor citation ==
Bibber served on board the U.S.S. Agawam, as one of a volunteer crew of a powder boat which was exploded near Fort Fisher 23 December 1864. The powder boat, towed in by the Wilderness to prevent detection by the enemy, cast off and slowly steamed to within 300 yards of the beach. After fuses and fires had been lit and a second anchor with short scope let go to assure the boat's tailing inshore, the crew again boarded the Wilderness and proceeded a distance of 12 miles from shore. Less than 2 hours later the explosion took place, and the following day fires were observed still burning at the forts.

== See also ==
- List of American Civil War Medal of Honor recipients: A–F
