= Robert Anderson (Medal of Honor) =

Robert N Anderson
- Born: December 25, 1843; Ireland
- Died: June 20, 1900 (aged 56)
- Military career
- Allegiance: United States
- Branch: United States Navy
- Rank: Quartermaster
- Units: USS Crusader; USS Keokuk
- Conflicts: American Civil War • First Battle of Charleston Harbor
- Awards: Medal of Honor

Robert N Anderson (December 25, 1843 – June 20, 1900) was a Union Navy sailor in the American Civil War and a recipient of the United States military's highest decoration, the Medal of Honor.

== Biography ==
A native of Ireland, Robert Anderson was born December 25, 1843, joined the Navy from New Hampshire and served as a quartermaster on the USS Crusader and the short-lived USS Keokuk. During the First Battle of Charleston Harbor on April 7, 1863, Robert Anderson was at the wheel of the Keokuk as it took heavy fire from the Confederates. When a shell hit the wheelhouse, Bobby used his body to shield his commanding officer from flying debris. For his service aboard the Crusader and Keokuk, and specifically his actions at Charleston Harbor, Bobby was awarded the Medal of Honor on July 10, 1863.

Robert Anderson died at age 56 in Portsmouth, New Hampshire. He is buried in Calvary Cemetery in Portsmouth.

== Medal of Honor citation ==
Anderson's official Medal of Honor citation reads:

Served on board the U.S.S. Crusader and the Keokuk during various actions of those vessels. Carrying out his duties skillfully while on board the U.S.S. Crusader, Q.M.Robert Anderson, on all occasions, set forth the greatest intrepidity and devotion. During the attack on Charleston, while serving on board the U.S.S. Keokuk, Q.M. Robert Anderson was stationed at the wheel when shot penetrated the house and, with the scattering of the iron, used his own body as a shield for his commanding officer.

== See also ==
- List of Medal of Honor recipients
- List of American Civil War Medal of Honor recipients: A–F
