= USS Rhind =

Benham-class destroyer

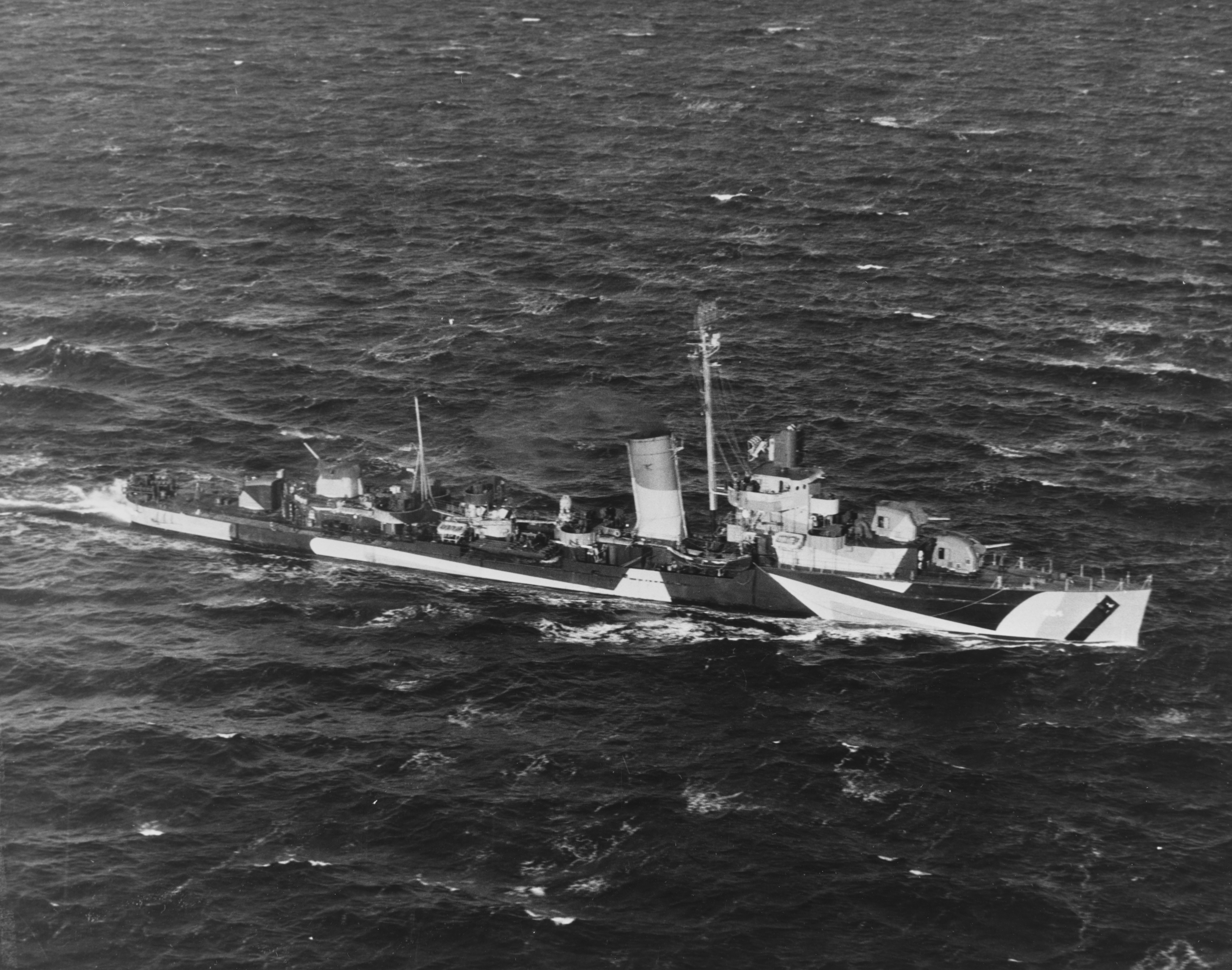
- USS Rhind in January, 1945

History

United States
- Namesake: Alexander Colden Rhind
- Builder: Philadelphia Naval Shipyard
- Laid down: 22 September 1937
- Launched: 28 July 1938
- Commissioned: 10 November 1939
- Decommissioned: 26 August 1946
- Stricken: 5 April 1948
- Fate: Sunk, 22 March 1948

General characteristics
- Class & type: Benham-class destroyer
- Displacement: 2,350 tons (full)
- Length: 341 ft 3 in
- Beam: 35 ft 5 in
- Draft: 14 ft 4 in
- Propulsion: 50,000 shp, Westinghouse Geared Turbines, 2 propellers
- Speed: 34 knots
- Complement: 184 officers and enlisted
- Armament: 4 × 5 in (130 mm)/38 guns; 16 × 21 inch (533 mm) torpedo tubes

USS Rhind (DD-404) was a Benham-class destroyer in the United States Navy. She was named for Alexander Colden Rhind.

Rhind (DD-404) was laid down 22 September 1937 at the Philadelphia Navy Yard; launched 28 July 1938; sponsored by Mrs. Frederick S. Camp; and commissioned 10 November 1939.

== Initial Duties ==
Following an extended -shakedown cruise to Brazil and postshakedown availability, Rhind steamed south again and from 5 July to 19 December 1940 conducted exercises in the Caribbean and patrolled off Martinique. Employed as carrier escort and engaged in fleet exercises during the first half of 1941, she joined TF 1 in June and through the northern summer steamed in the North Atlantic shipping lanes on Neutrality Patrol. In August she escorted Augusta (CA-31), with President Franklin D. Roosevelt embarked, to Newfoundland for the Atlantic Charter conferences. Then, at their conclusion, she escorted HMS Prince of Wales, carrying Prime Minister Winston Churchill, to Iceland. On 17 August she returned to patrol duty off the Newfoundland coast.

Detached in October, Rhind escorted Yorktown (CV-5) from midocean to Halifax, Nova Scotia in early November, then joined a Halifax-Cape Town convoy as escort. Off Southwest Africa 27 November, she was detailed to escort Ranger (CV-4) to Trinidad. They arrived 3 December. Four days later the United States entered World War II.

== Enters the War ==
Rhind then steamed north to patrol the waters off the British Imperial fortress colony of Bermuda. In February 1942, she shifted further north and through March escorted Icelandic convoys. In April she shepherded a convoy to the Panama Canal Zone and on the 23rd, while en route back to New York, conducted her first depth charge attack on a German submarine. The U-boat had shelled a Norwegian merchantman off New Jersey. Arriving at New York the same day, she departed again on the 30th to escort convoy AT-15 to Iceland. There, on 15 May, she joined TF 99 and for the next 3 months operated with that force and the British Home Fleet in hunting German units operating out of Norway to intercept convoys to Murmansk and Archangel.

== Return to Americas ==
Rhind returned to the United States in July. In August she escorted coastal convoys between Boston and NS Argentia, then turned south to conduct ASW operations off the southeastern coast and in the Caribbean. Exercises in the Casco Bay area followed in early October and on the 24th she got underway for North Africa. Screening Massachusetts (BB-59) en route she arrived off the Moroccan coast on the night of 7 November. During the Naval Battle of Casablanca on the 8th she shelled Vichy vessels attempting to repel the Allied invasion of North Africa and blasted shore batteries. Through the 12th, she supported the troops ashore and screened larger ships in the Fedhala-Casablanca area. Back at Hampton Roads 20 November, the destroyer resumed escort duty and into the new year, 1943, guarded convoys to North Africa. On 28 April she returned to New York with convoy GUS-6, which had departed, as UGS-6, 4 March and had lost five merchantmen to a wolfpack between the 13th and 17th. On 10 May, Rhind departed New York again for North Africa, escorting a troopship convoy, and arrived at Algiers 2 June. For the next month she conducted ASW patrols and escorted ships along the North African coast.

== Invasion of Sicily ==
On 10 July the invasion of Sicily began. On the 14th Rhind arrived off the coast, in the screen of a reinforcement convoy and joined the antiaircraft defense and fire-support group. Through the 20th she patrolled off Gela, then shifted to Palermo. After screening the mine and patrol craft which cleared the harbor, she remained on antiaircraft station. On the 26th, as she stood by the heavily damaged Mayrant (DD-402) taking off wounded and assisting in salvage work, she sustained several casualties and some damage to her hull from a near miss delivered by a Junkers Ju 88. Through 2 August she continued to patrol off Palermo, then on the 3rd, commenced offensive sweeps near Messina, sinking an 'E-boat' on the first day, and supported "leap frog" landings along the coast.

Caught in another air raid on the 22nd, Rhind gained a brief respite at Oran, but suffered further near misses while escorting a convoy to Bizerte through September. At Bizerte on the 6th, she fought off another raid, an attempt to disrupt the forces staging for the invasion at Salerno. On the 9th, the destroyer arrived in the Gulf of Salerno and continued her war with the Luftwaffe. On the 11th she got underway for Oran, whence, for the next month and a half, Rhind escorted reinforcements to Italy. In November she sailed for New York and, after guarding two New York to United Kingdom convoys, shifted to coastwise and Caribbean escort duty interspersed with offensive ASW activities. On 26 July 1944 she resumed transatlantic convoy duty with a run to the United Kingdom. A convoy to Naples followed in late September and, in November and December, she screened carrier Shangri-La (CV-38) on her shakedown cruise.

== The Pacific ==
Between January and March 1945 Rhind continued coastal and Caribbean escort duty. Then after another run to Britain, 23 March to 18 April, she prepared for transfer to the Pacific Theater. Sailing 5 May, she arrived at Pearl Harbor on the 30th; and, after exercises there, steamed westward in the screen of carriers Lexington (CV-16), Hancock (CV-19), and Cowpens (CVL-25). On 20 June, the carriers launched strikes against Wake Island. Then, minus Cowpens and an escort, the force continued on to Leyte, arriving 26 June. From Leyte, Rhind steamed to Ulithi, whence she escorted cargo and troop ships to Okinawa and conducted ASW patrols in the Carolines. Shifted to Saipan in August, she escorted another convoy to Okinawa after the cessation of hostilities, then on 2 September steamed to Pagan Island where Commodore Vernon F. Grant accepted the surrender of the Japanese garrisoned there.

== After the war ==
Returning to Saipan the same day, Rhind accompanied landing craft to Marcus Island. Then, on the 16th, headed north for Iwo Jima, whence she patrolled on air/sea rescue station until 2 November. She returned to Saipan on the 4th and operated in the Marianas Islands until mid-December when she got underway for the United States. Arriving at San Diego, California 30 December, she was stripped and returned to Pearl Harbor and prepared for experimental testing. On 15 May she joined Joint Task Force 1 for Operation Crossroads, the atomic test series scheduled to be detonated at Bikini Atoll in July.

== Fate ==
Surviving the tests on 1 and 25 July, but highly contaminated, Rhind was decommissioned 26 August 1946 and moved to Kwajalein where, after radiological clearance had been given and further examinations had been made, she was sunk, 22 March 1948. Her name was struck from the Navy list 5 April 1948.

To date, no other ship in the United States Navy has been named Rhind.

== Honors ==
Rhind earned four battle stars during World War II.
