= Moodna formulella =

Scientific classification
- Domain: Eukaryota
- Kingdom: Animalia
- Phylum: Arthropoda
- Class: Insecta
- Order: Lepidoptera
- Family: Pyralidae
- Genus: Moodna
- Species: M. formulella

Binomial name
- Moodna formulella Schaus, 1913

Species of moth

Moodna formulella is a species of snout moth in the genus Moodna. It was described by Schaus in 1913, and is known from Costa Rica.
