= First Battle of Charleston Harbor =

Battle of the American Civil War

Coordinates: 32.7526°N 79.8745°W

- Part of the American Civil War
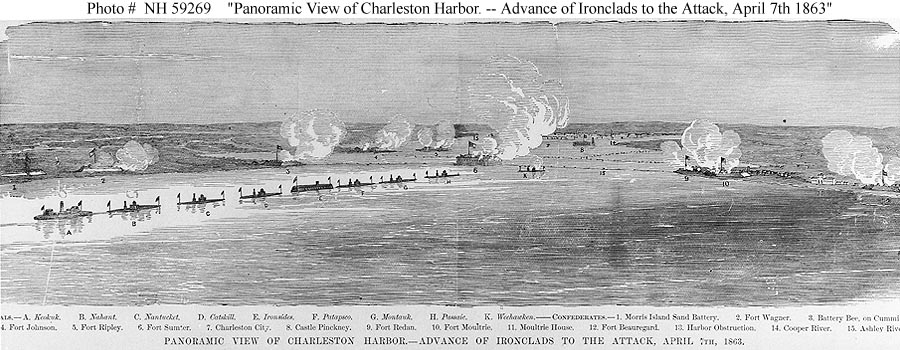
- Advance of Ironclads to the Attack, April 7th, 1863
Date	April 7, 1863
Location	Charleston, South Carolina
Result	Confederate victory • Union attack repulsed

Belligerents
United States	(Confederate States of America) Confederate States

Commanders and leaders
(United States Navy) Samuel Francis Du Pont	(Confederate States of America) P.G.T. Beauregard

Units involved
South Atlantic Blockading Squadron	First Military District of South Carolina

Strength
2 ironclads 7 monitors	2 ironclads 385 land-based guns

Casualties and losses
1 killed 21 wounded 1 ship sunk	5 killed 8 wounded

The First Battle of Charleston Harbor was an engagement near Charleston, South Carolina that took place April 7, 1863, during the American Civil War. The striking force was a fleet of nine ironclad warships of the Union Navy, including seven monitors that were improved versions of the original USS Monitor. A Union Army contingent associated with the attack took no active part in the battle. The ships, under command of Rear Admiral Samuel Francis Du Pont, attacked the Confederate defenses near the entrance to Charleston Harbor. Navy Department officials in Washington hoped for a stunning success that would validate a new form of warfare, with armored warships mounting heavy guns reducing traditional forts.

Du Pont had been given seven of the Passaic class monitors, the powerful New Ironsides, and the experimental ironclad Keokuk. Other naval operations were sidetracked as their resources were diverted to the attack on Charleston. After a long period of preparation, conditions of tide and visibility allowed the attack to proceed. The slow monitors got into position rather late in the afternoon, and when the tide turned, Du Pont had to suspend the operation. Firing had occupied less than two hours, and the ships had been unable to penetrate even the first line of harbor defense. The fleet retired with one in a sinking condition and most of the others damaged. One sailor in the fleet was killed and twenty-one were wounded, while five Confederate soldiers were killed and eight wounded. After consulting with his captains, Du Pont concluded that his fleet had little chance to succeed. He therefore declined to renew the battle the next morning.

== Background ==
=== Union ===
The war was not going well for the Union in late 1862 and early 1863. Although the Confederate Army of Northern Virginia had been repulsed at Antietam, it had escaped intact and had inflicted a major defeat on the Federal Army of the Potomac at Fredericksburg, Virginia, following which the Army of the Potomac was in disarray. In the West, the campaign for control of the Mississippi River seemed to be bogged down before Vicksburg, Mississippi. The Confederates had actually managed to retake Galveston, Texas. A mood of war-weariness was evident throughout the North, and the fall elections, regarded as a referendum on the war, had shown a swing away from the Republican party. The Lincoln Administration therefore began to apply great pressure on its field commanders to achieve some success that would lift the national spirit. It was in this atmosphere that the Navy Department began to urge an attack on Charleston.

Charleston in 1863 was already of only limited military significance, as the active centers of combat were mostly in Virginia and the interior of the country. Its value as a port for blockade runners was not much greater than that of Mobile, Alabama or Savannah, Georgia, and all were eclipsed by Wilmington, North Carolina. However, it was selected as a target more for its symbolic worth than for its strategic importance. In the words of one of the participants in the naval attack, "Fort Sumter was regarded in the public mind, North and South, as the citadel of the fortress, the incarnation of the rebellion, and as such it was attacked and defended."

Among the most vocal proponents of the attack was Assistant Secretary of the Navy Gustavus Vasa Fox. Fox had an ulterior motive, in that he wanted the Navy to be free from domination by the Army. He was therefore not disturbed when General-in-Chief Henry W. Halleck would not agree to a major part for the Army in the operation. Halleck was willing to commit only 10,000 to 15,000 untrained soldiers, who would exploit any successes made by the naval force but would not otherwise have an active role.

The Navy Department supported the operation by assigning almost all of its armored vessels to the South Atlantic Blockading Squadron, commanded by Rear Admiral Du Pont. These included the massive USS New Ironsides; New Ironsides would serve as Du Pont's flagship. The Passaic class gunboats were designed as improved versions of the original USS Monitor; as they were commissioned, they were sent to South Carolina, so seven of them were able to participate in the attack. In addition, the experimental armored gunboat Keokuk was added to the fleet.

Du Pont did not share the enthusiasm of the Navy Department for the armored vessels. Although they could withstand whatever punishment the coastal artillery of the day could mete out, their offensive capabilities were severely restricted. New Ironsides carried 16 guns (broadside, so only 8 could be brought to bear at one time), but each of the others carried only two guns. Each Passaic had one 15-inch (380 mm) and one 11-inch (280 mm) gun, while Keokuk carried two 11-inch (280 mm) guns. Although they were larger than the typical 32-pounder weapons that would be used against them, their rate of fire was much less. Seven minutes was needed to swab, reload, and aim between shots.

Despite his lack of faith in the monitors, Du Pont did not propose any alternative plans to capture Charleston. He concentrated instead on how to preserve his ships. His defeatism must be taken into account in any reckoning of results of the battle.

=== Confederacy ===
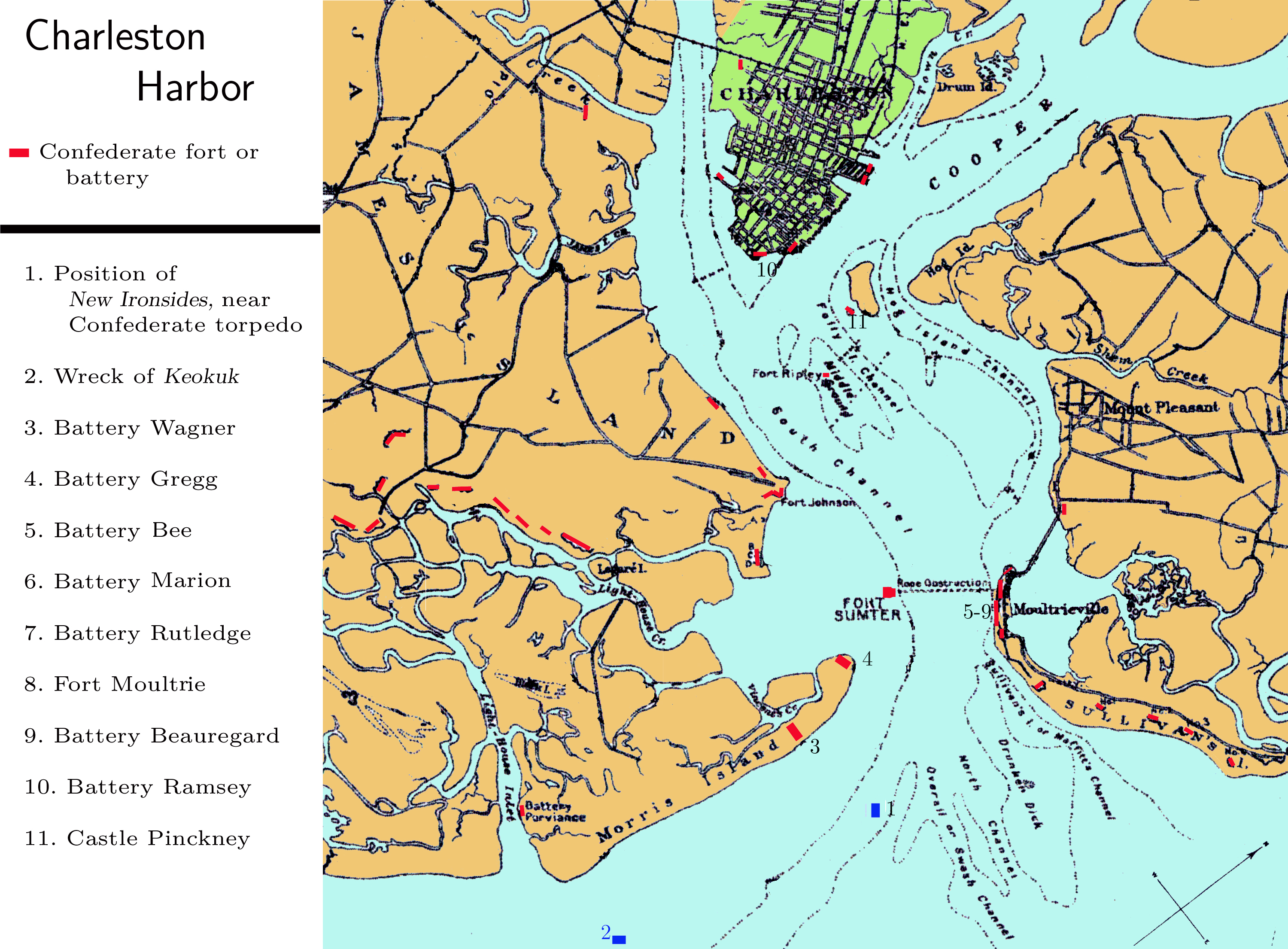
Confederate defenses at Charleston Harbor

General P. G. T. Beauregard commanded the Confederate Department of South Carolina, Georgia, and Florida. As he had led the rebel forces at Charleston at the time of the bombardment of Fort Sumter that opened the war, he was intimately familiar with the fortifications surrounding the city. He had been called away to service elsewhere, but returned in September 1862. The batteries that had been set up under his supervision to assault the fort were incorporated into the harbor defenses. His successors, Major General John C. Pemberton and Brigadier General Roswell S. Ripley, made some additions in the year and a half that he was gone, but the basic features were due to Beauregard.

The fortifications that had been set up around the harbor were well-suited to repel attacks from the ocean. The most seaward guns were placed in Battery Wagner (often referred to in Union accounts as Fort Wagner) and Battery Gregg, both on Morris Island. Near them, on a man-made island on the same side of the harbor, was Fort Sumter. Fort Moultrie and its outlying batteries lay across the harbor on Sullivan's Island. These formed the first or outer defensive ring. A second ring consisted of Fort Johnson and Battery Glover on James Island, and Fort Ripley and Castle Pinckney in the harbor, and finally the White Point Battery (Battery Ramsay) at the southern end of the city itself. A third ring, formed of several batteries on the Cooper and Ashley Rivers and in Charleston, was intended to protect against land assault on the city. In all, they mounted some 385 land-based guns.

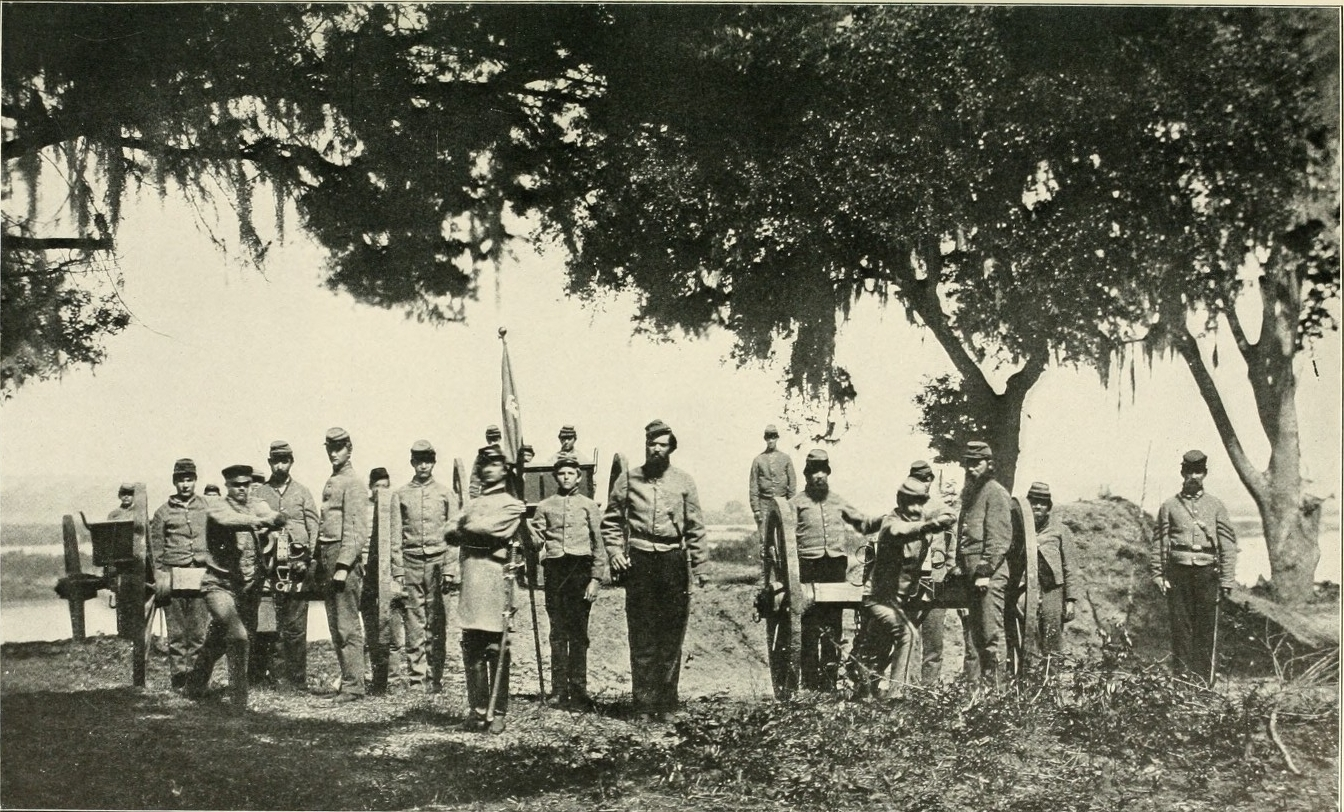
Confederate artillery at Charleston Harbor

The defense also included shipping barriers spanning the harbor. First to be put in place was a row of piles that stretched from Fort Johnson to near Fort Ripley in the Middle Ground. This proved to be ineffective, as storms and strong tides soon ripped out major sections. Later, a "boom" was laid between Forts Sumter and Moultrie. Formed of 20-foot (6.1 m) lengths of railroad iron floated by large timbers, bound together by chains, and anchored at intervals, this barrier also broke under the strain imposed by the tides. It was supplemented by a rope obstruction that was meant to foul the propellers of enemy vessels. Despite the effort that went into these barriers, the defenders did not believe them to be serious impediments to an invading fleet. The same was true of most of the torpedoes (present-day mines) that were laid. Du Pont was unaware of their flaws, so the barriers and torpedoes were major concerns in his preparations for the battle.

The South also had a naval contingent present. Two armored gunboats, CSS Chicora and Palmetto State, were ready to fight if the invaders neared the city. They would be used only reluctantly, as they were known to be too slow to pose a significant threat to the Northern monitors.

The defenses before Charleston were strong, but Beauregard knew that he had to prepare for the worst. Thus, shortly after he resumed his command, he made the potentially fateful decision to defend the city street by street if necessary. He wrote to Governor Francis W. Pickens to state his position: "As I understand it is the wish of all, people and government, that the city shall be defended to the last extremity."

== Battle ==
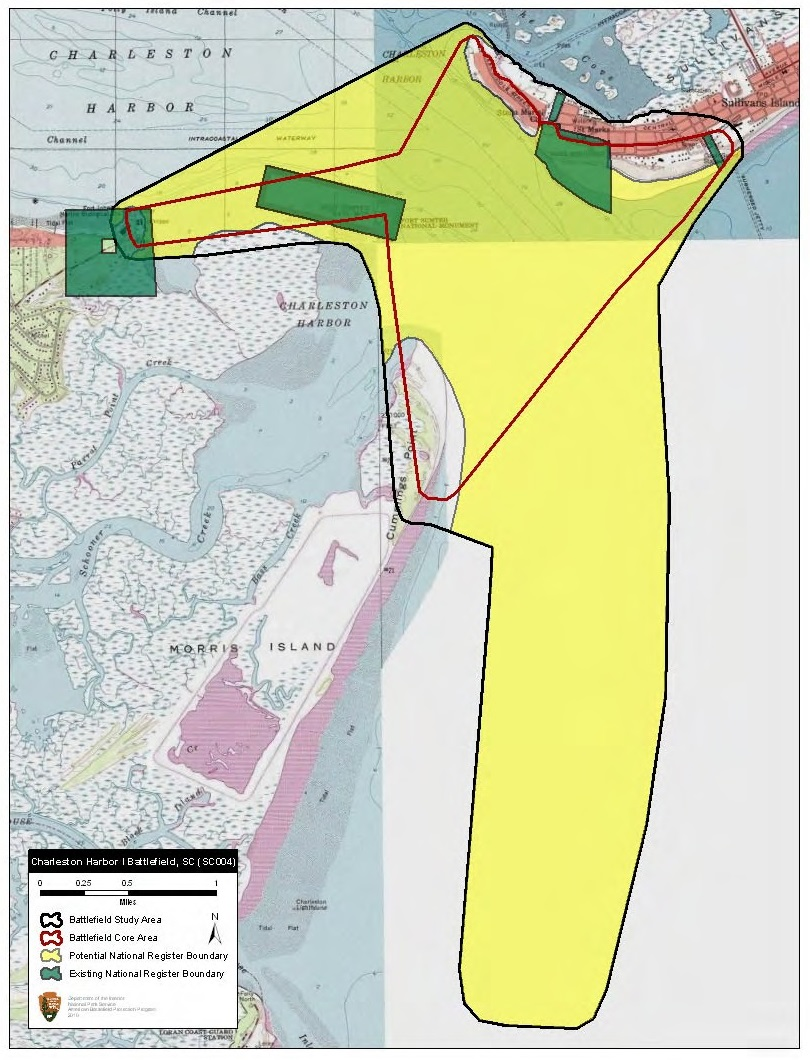
Map of Charleston Harbor I Battlefield core and study areas by the American Battlefield Protection Program.

Du Pont chose to mount the attack in the early part of April, in order to take advantage of the spring tides brought by the full Moon.

=== Minesweepers ===
As the date was nearing, a new device was introduced by the Navy Department. Because of Du Pont's often-expressed fears of torpedoes in the harbor, the department had called on the man who designed the monitors, John Ericsson, to provide some means of defense. He came up with a raft-like structure made up of heavy timbers that could be attached to a ship's bow. Each raft carried grappling hooks intended to snag the mooring lines of enemy torpedoes. It also carried its own torpedo, so it could blast its way through the obstructions. Two of the rafts were built and sent down to South Carolina in time for the attack. After considering the steering and handling problems the rafts would introduce, Du Pont's captains were unwilling to mount them on their ships. The torpedo was particularly worrisome, as collisions between ships in the narrow channel with unknown currents could be expected. Only one captain, John Rodgers of Weehawken, could be persuaded to carry the raft on his ship, and then only without the torpedo. In the event, the motion of the raft pounded his ship so severely that Rodgers decided to cast it loose before it had cleared any enemy torpedoes.

=== Final preparations ===
The fleet assembled off the mouth of the harbor on 5 April; on that day, Du Pont sent the buoy schooner USS Admiral Du Pont and the survey vessel Bibb, accompanied by Keokuk, to mark the entrance channel with buoys. The weather on the following day was hazy, making navigation difficult, so Du Pont postponed the attack for another day. The harbor was obscured by haze again on the morning of April 7, but it cleared up by noon, and the signal to attack was given.

=== Line of battle ===
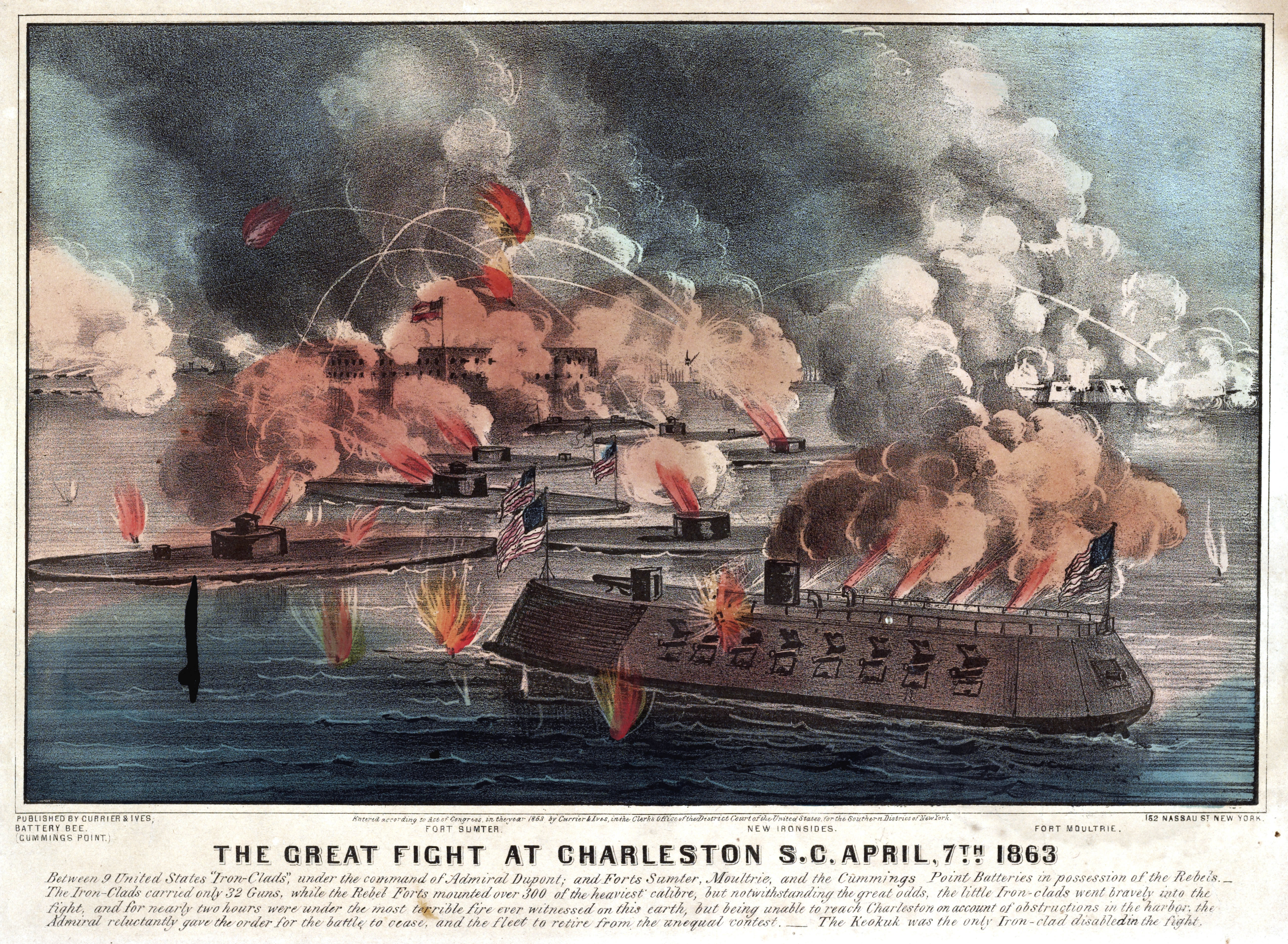
1863 lithograph of the battle by Currier & Ives

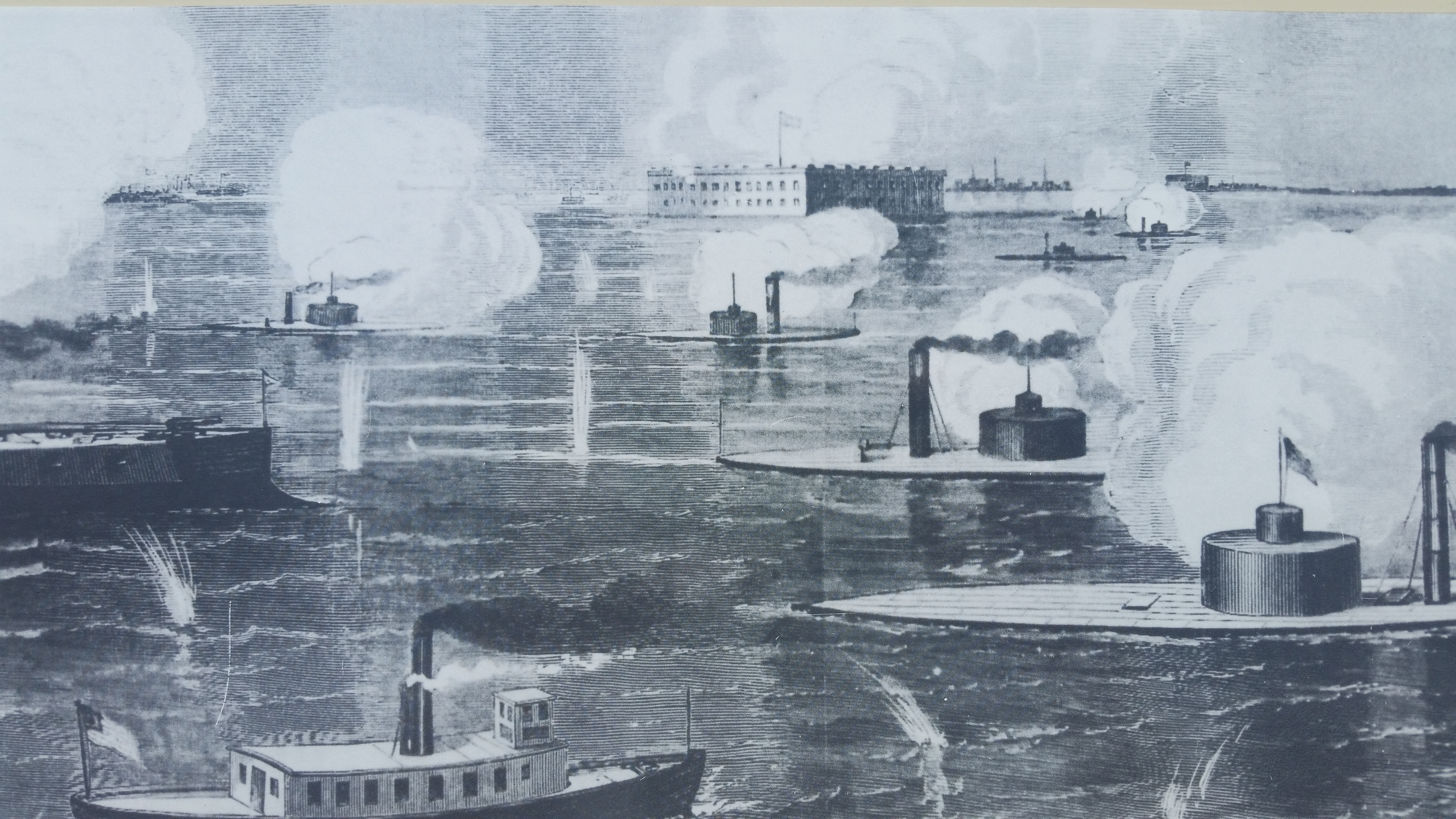
Fort Sumter National Monument marker depicting the First Battle of Charleston Harbor The bow of the USS New Ironsides is on the left while Fort Sumter is in the background

Four monitors led the way; first was USS Weehawken, under Captain John Rodgers. Getting under way, Weehawken's anchor fouled the grappling hooks on the torpedo raft, delaying the start by about an hour. She then could make only three knots (5.5 km/h), and the rest of the column had to follow at her slow pace. Second was Passaic, commanded by Charleston native Captain Percival Drayton. Third was Montauk, led by Commander John L. Worden; Worden was famed as the captain of USS Monitor when she engaged CSS Virginia at the Battle of Hampton Roads. Next came Patapsco, under Commander Daniel Ammen. These were followed by the flagship, New Ironsides, commanded by Commodore Thomas Turner; also aboard were Rear Admiral Du Pont and his fleet captain, Christopher Raymond Perry Rodgers. Then came three more monitors: Catskill, under Commander George W. Rodgers, brother of C. R. P. Rodgers and cousin of John Rodgers; Nantucket, under Commander Donald M. Fairfax; and Nahant, under Commander John Downes. The experimental non-monitor ironclad Keokuk, commanded by Commander Alexander C. Rhind, was at the end of the line.

Almost two hours elapsed between the time the ships got under way until the opening shots were fired. In that time, they found that New Ironsides had severe handling problems in the strong current and shallow water. She was forced to stop and anchor to avoid going aground, just about the time that the lead monitors were coming under fire. She dropped out of the line, and the four ships following her passed around, with some difficulty. The waiting Rebels could not have chosen a better place for New Ironsides to anchor, as she was directly over a 3000-pound (1360 kg) electrically triggered torpedo that would be activated by closing a switch on shore. Their high hopes were dashed, however, when the switch was closed and nothing happened. Two explanations for the failure have been offered. According to the one, an ordnance wagon had broken the wires by being driven over them. The other holds that the wires were simply too long, so the electric current would not be great enough to create a spark and detonate the charge.

Meanwhile, the other ships were being pummeled by artillery fire. Weehawken had advanced to a line of buoys that Captain Rodgers thought might mark torpedoes, so he swerved from the channel and stopped to consider what to do next. At this time, an underwater explosion rocked the vessel; Rodgers thought that it was a torpedo, but some historians believe that it was more likely the explosion of a shell from one of the forts. In either case, the ship suffered no significant injury. Because she had left the channel, however, the line of ships following her were thrown into confusion, and whatever was left of Du Pont's battle plan collapsed. The intense fire the ships received from the forts kept them farther from Fort Sumter than the admiral had envisioned, so their return fire was less accurate than planned. It was not accuracy that determined the result, however, but the sheer disparity in firepower. In the course of the two hours of the engagement, the Confederate forces got off more than 2,000 shot and shell, of which 520 hit. By contrast, the Union fleet fired only 154 shots. Their armor protected the crews, but several ships suffered damage that impaired their fighting abilities, such as jammed turrets and gunport stoppers. Worst hit was Keokuk, which was hit 90 times, including 19 shots at or below the waterline. Captain Rhind withdrew his ship from the fight, barely able to keep her afloat until she was beyond enemy gunfire. By this time, the tide had turned, so Admiral Du Pont decided to suspend the attack until the following day.

=== Termination ===
Du Pont in his official report asserted that he fully intended to renew the attack the next day, but his captains were unanimously opposed. Keokuk sank during the night (with no loss of life), two or three of the monitors had sustained damage that would keep them out of further action for days if not weeks, and the captains agreed that nothing good could come from prolonging the battle. Even if they could knock out Fort Sumter, the rest of the fortifications remained, and the fleet had not penetrated the first defensive ring.

Thus the battle fizzled out. The Union had lost one ironclad, and Fort Sumter had sustained mild damage that could be repaired in short order, though it was somewhat more than Du Pont realized. Personnel casualties were quite low despite the volume of gunfire. Only one man, Quartermaster Edward Cobb of Nahant, was killed in the fleet, and 21 others sustained various degrees of injury. The Rebels had lost five killed and eight wounded.

== Aftermath ==
Secretary of the Navy Welles was dismayed by the failure. The small casualty list, coupled with Du Pont's evident reluctance beforehand, led him to believe at first that the attack was not pressed with vigor. His criticism softened only when John Rodgers, who was known to be a thoroughly competent and aggressive officer, sided with Du Pont. As Rodgers saw it, and as Welles had to agree, Charleston could not be taken by a purely naval assault. It would require a combined operation, with full cooperation of both services, to achieve that.

Welles saw that Du Pont was correct in stating that Charleston could not be taken by naval forces alone, but the breach between the two men was irreparable. Welles recalled the admiral on June 3, replacing him at first with Rear Admiral Andrew H. Foote. Foote, however, had never fully recovered from a wound he had received during the Battle of Fort Donelson, and he died before he could report to his new station. Welles therefore somewhat reluctantly turned responsibility for the naval portion of the campaign to Rear Admiral John A. Dahlgren.

Du Pont's captains fared better than he, and none of them suffered professionally for their participation in the failed campaign. Seven of them (John and C. R. P. Rodgers, Ammen, Fairfax, Turner, Worden, and Rhind) eventually became rear admirals. Drayton was appointed Chief of the Bureau of Navigation, which would have made him a rear admiral, but he died of a heart attack while awaiting Senate confirmation. George W. Rodgers was known as one of the best captains in the fleet, but he was killed in a later attack on Charleston.

The monitors and New Ironsides continued to take part in the blockade of Charleston that remained in force, but the former never again inspired such awe among the Rebels as they had before the attack. All were used in the continuing campaign against the city.

Even the sunken Keokuk continued to figure in the war. She had sunk in shallow water that left her smokestack above the surface, so her position was known. Adolphus W. LaCoste, a Charleston civilian hired by the Confederate government, was able to salvage the two 11-inch (280 mm) guns from the wreck. He and his crew worked by night and were able to escape notice of the blockaders; Du Pont did not suspect their activity until it was announced in the Charleston Mercury.

== See also ==
- Second Battle of Charleston Harbor
- Battle of Fort Pulaski
- Blockade runners of the American Civil War
- List of monitors of the United States Navy
- Ironclads: American Civil War

== Bibliography ==
- Ammen, Daniel, The Atlantic Coast.
  New York: C. Scribner's sons, 1885; reprint: Blue and Grey Press, n.d.
- Browning, Robert M. Jr., Success is all that was expected: the South Atlantic blockading squadron
  during the Civil War.
  Washington, D.C. : Brassey's, 2002. ISBN 1-57488-514-6
- Coker, PC, "Charleston's Maritime Heritage 1670–1865",
  Charleston, CokerCraft Press, 1987 ISBN 0-914432-03-6
- Gibbons, Tony, Warships and naval battles of the Civil War.
  Gallery Books, 1989. ISBN 0-8317-9301-5
- Musicant, Ivan, Divided waters: the naval history of the Civil War.
  New York: HarperCollins, 1995. ISBN 0-06-016482-4
- Reed, Rowena, Combined operations in the Civil War.
  Annapolis: Naval Institute Press, 1978. ISBN 0-87021-122-6
- Rodgers, C. R. P., "Du Pont's attack at Charleston." Battles and leaders of the Civil War,
  eds. Johnson, Robert Underwood, and Clarence Clough Buel. Vol. 4, pp. 32–47
  Century, 1894; reprint: Castle, 1956.
- Scharf, J. Thomas (1887). History of the Confederate States Navy. New York: Rogers & Sherwood.
- Tucker, Spencer, Blue & gray navies: the Civil War afloat.
  Annapolis, Md.: Naval Institute Press, 2006. ISBN 1-59114-882-0
- Wise, Stephen R., Lifeline of the Confederacy: blockade running during the Civil War.
  Columbia: University of South Carolina Press, 1988. ISBN 0-87249-554-X
- National Park Service battle summary
- CWSAC Report Update

=== Further reading ===
- Bostick, Douglas W. (2010). Charleston Under Siege: The Impregnable City.
  The History Press, Charleston, South Carolina. p. 158. ISBN 9781596297579. Url
- Brennan, Patrick (1996) Secessionville: Assault on Charleston
  Savas Publishing Company, Campbell, California, pp. 394, ISBN 1-882810-08-2, Url
