= Moodna olivella =

Scientific classification
- Kingdom: Animalia
- Phylum: Arthropoda
- Class: Insecta
- Order: Lepidoptera
- Family: Pyralidae
- Genus: Moodna
- Species: M. olivella

Binomial name
- Moodna olivella Hampson in Ragonot, 1901

Species of moth

Moodna olivella is a species of snout moth in the genus Moodna. It was described by George Hampson in 1901 and is known from Brazil (including Rio de Janeiro, the type location).
