= Moodna clitellatella =

Scientific classification
- Domain: Eukaryota
- Kingdom: Animalia
- Phylum: Arthropoda
- Class: Insecta
- Order: Lepidoptera
- Family: Pyralidae
- Genus: Moodna
- Species: M. clitellatella

Binomial name
- Moodna clitellatella (Ragonot, 1888)

Synonyms
- Hornigia clitellatella Ragonot, 1888

Species of moth

Moodna clitellatella is a species of snout moth in the genus Moodna. It was described by Ragonot in 1888, and is known from Peru (including Callao, the type location).
