= Moodna pallidostrinella =

Scientific classification
- Domain: Eukaryota
- Kingdom: Animalia
- Phylum: Arthropoda
- Class: Insecta
- Order: Lepidoptera
- Family: Pyralidae
- Genus: Moodna
- Species: M. pallidostrinella

Binomial name
- Moodna pallidostrinella Neunzig, 1990

Species of moth

Moodna pallidostrinella, the paler moodna moth, is a species of snout moth in the genus Moodna. It was described by Herbert H. Neunzig in 1990 from Big Pine Key, in the US state of Florida. The species has a wider distribution though, including Florida, Georgia, Maryland, New York, Ontario, South Carolina and Tennessee.
