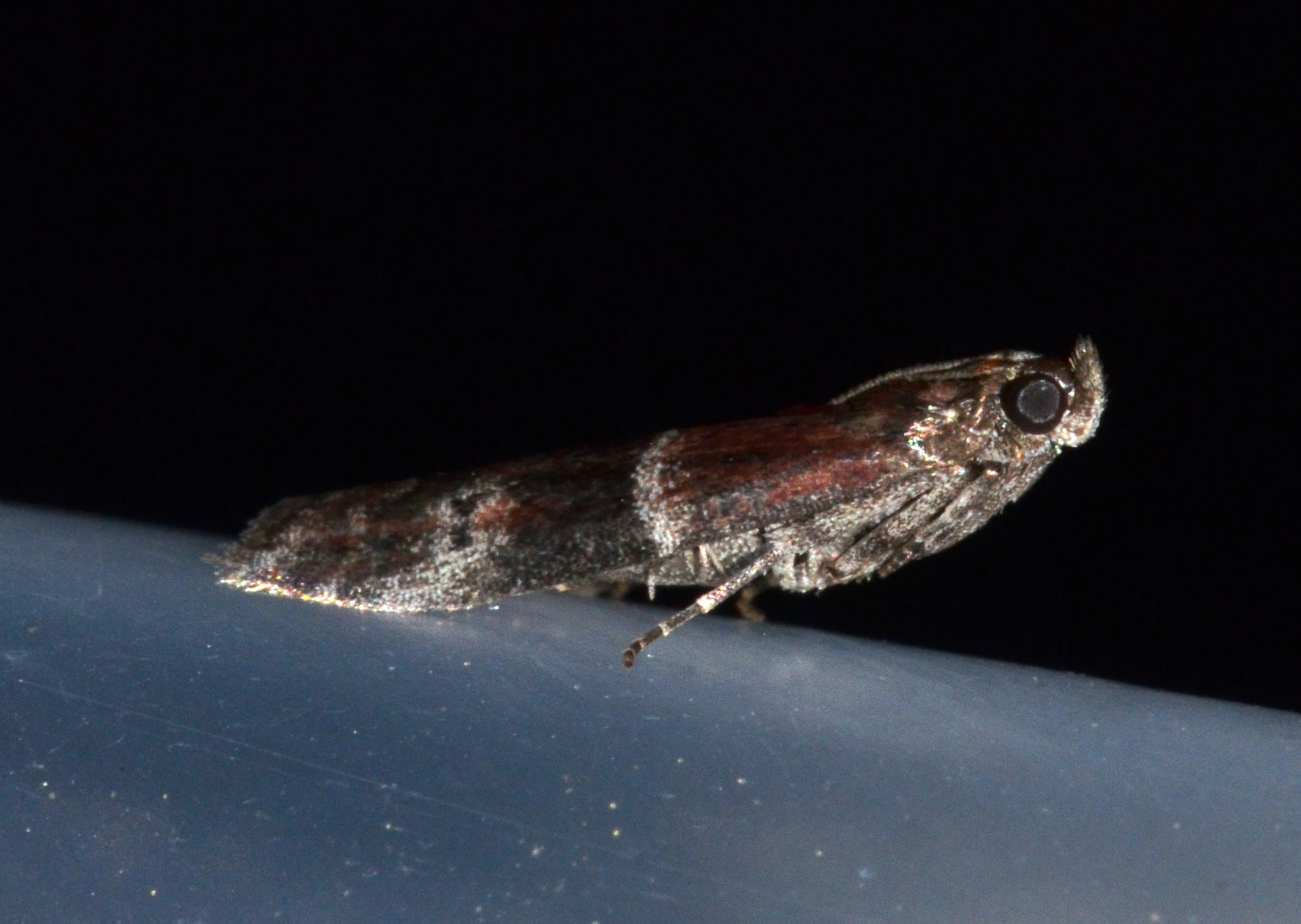

Scientific classification
- Kingdom: Animalia
- Phylum: Arthropoda
- Clade: Pancrustacea
- Class: Insecta
- Order: Lepidoptera
- Family: Pyralidae
- Genus: Moodna
- Species: M. ostrinella

Binomial name
- Moodna ostrinella (Clemens, 1860)

Synonyms
- Ephestia ostrinella Clemens, 1860; Hornigia obtusangulella Ragonot, 1887; Moodna pelviculella Hulst, 1890

= Moodna ostrinella =

Species of moth

Moodna ostrinella, the darker moodna moth, is a species of snout moth in the genus Moodna. It was described by James Brackenridge Clemens in 1860, and is known from North America, including Alabama, Florida, Illinois, Maine, Maryland, Massachusetts, Michigan, Minnesota, New Brunswick, New Jersey, New York, Ohio, Oklahoma, Ontario, Pennsylvania, Quebec, South Carolina, Tennessee, Texas and West Virginia.
