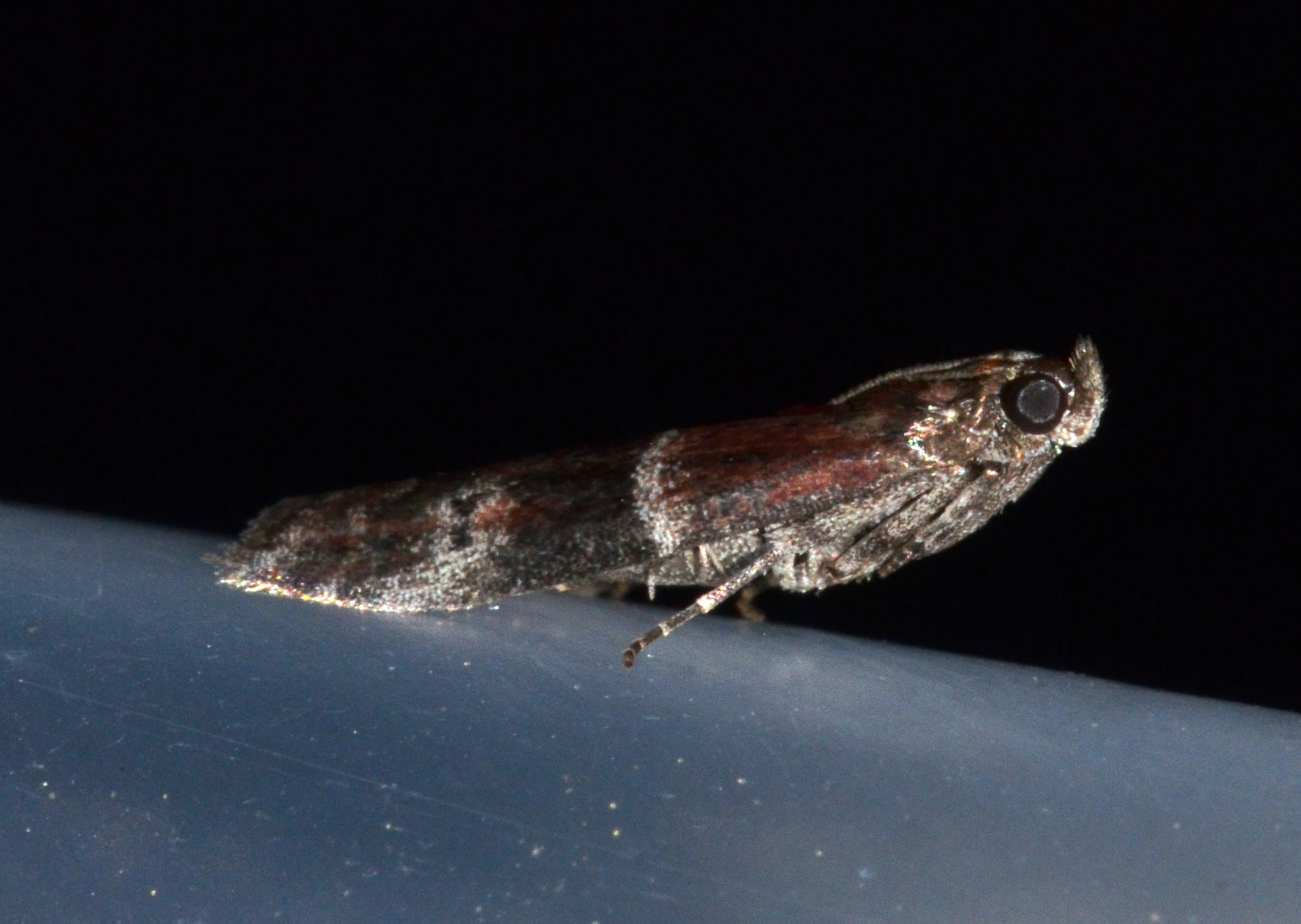
- Moodna ostrinella

Scientific classification
- Domain: Eukaryota
- Kingdom: Animalia
- Phylum: Arthropoda
- Class: Insecta
- Order: Lepidoptera
- Family: Pyralidae
- Subfamily: Phycitinae
- Genus: Moodna; Hulst, 1890

= Moodna (moth) =

Genus of moths

Moodna is a genus of snout moths described by George Duryea Hulst in 1890.

== Species ==
- Moodna bisinuella Hampson, 1901
- Moodna clitellatella (Ragonot, 1888)
- Moodna formulella Schaus, 1913
- Moodna olivella Hampson in Ragonot, 1901
- Moodna ostrinella (Clemens, 1860)
- Moodna pallidostrinella Neunzig, 1990
