= Alexander Rhind =

American Navy admiral (1821–1897)

Alexander Colden Rhind
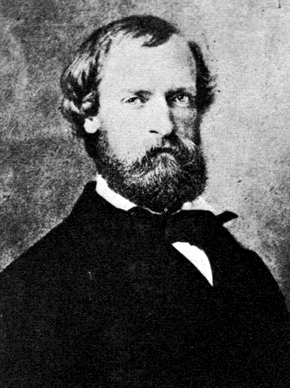
- Born: October 31, 1821; New York City, New York
- Died: November 8, 1897 (aged 76); New York City, New York
- Burial place: Colden Family Cemetery, Montgomery, New York
- Military career
- Allegiance: United States of America
- Branch: United States Navy
- Service years: 1838–1883
- Rank: Rear Admiral
- Commands: Crusader; Keokuk; Paul Jones; Wabash; Agawam; Louisiana; Congress
- Conflicts: Mexican–American War; American Civil War

Alexander Colden Rhind (October 31, 1821 – November 8, 1897) was a rear admiral in the United States Navy, who served during the Mexican–American War and American Civil War.

== Biography ==
=== Early life ===
Rhind was born in New York City, New York, the son of Charles Rhind, a prominent shipowner who became the U.S. minister to the Ottoman Empire in 1827. His mother, Susan Fell, was a descendant of Cadwallader Colden, the Governor of the colonial Province of New York from 1769 to 1771.

=== Early career ===
Rhind was appointed midshipman on September 3, 1838, and between 1839 and 1841 he served in the Mediterranean Squadron aboard the frigate Ohio and the sloop-of-war Cyane. He then served aboard the sloop-of-war Warren in the West Indies in 1842–1843, then on the frigate Macedonian off the coast of Africa in 1843–1844, before attending the Philadelphia Naval School in 1844–1845. Promoted to passed midshipman on July 2, 1845, Rhind served on the brig Washington in the United States Coast Survey in 1845–1846, which was then attached the Home Squadron on the coast of Mexico during the Mexican–American War, being present at Alvarado and the First Battle of Tabasco.

Rhind served on the steamer Water Witch in 1848, before rejoining the U.S. Coast Survey aboard the schooner Ewing on a voyage to the coast of California in 1849–1850. He then served aboard the sloop-of-war St. Mary's in the East Indies in 1850–1851, before returning to the U.S. Coast Survey, where he remained until 1854, receiving promotion to the rank of master on April 30, 1853.

Rhind was commissioned as a lieutenant on February 17, 1854, and served on the sloop-of-war John Adams in the Pacific Squadron, but in May 1855 was court-martialed after a disagreement with his commanding officer, and left the Navy in September 1855. Eventually reinstated, Rhind served on the sloop-of-war Constellation, the flagship of the Africa Squadron, from 1859 to 1861.

=== American Civil War ===
The American Civil War broke out in April 1861. On December 14, 1861, Rhind was ordered to take command of the screw steamer Crusader and, while commanding her, took part in the capture and destruction of Confederate works commanding the South Edisto, Dawho, and Pon-Pon Rivers, in April 1862, for which he later earned the thanks of the United States Department of the Navy in a letter dated September 7, 1864. He received promotion to lieutenant commander on July 16, 1862.

Promoted to commander on January 2, 1863, he participated in 1863 in the attacks on Charleston, South Carolina's defenses as commanding officer of the ironclad ram Keokuk. During the attack on April 7, 1863, Keokuk was struck over 90 times in 30 minutes, suffering 19 holes at or near her waterline. Retiring, she was stayed afloat until the following morning before finally sinking, by which time the crew had been taken off.

Later, after commanding the gunboat Paul Jones and the screw frigate Wabash, he assumed command of the sidewheel gunboat Agawam in the North Atlantic Blockading Squadron on October 23, 1863, and earned praise from Rear Admiral Samuel Phillips Lee for the "gallantry and endurance displayed" by hiss crew and him during an engagement with three Confederate artillery batteries at Deep Bottom on August 13, 1864.

In December 1864 Rhind was detailed to command the steamer Louisiana, which was loaded with 215 tons of gunpowder for use as a "powder boat," then towed by the sidewheel paddle steamer Wilderness to a point 250 yards (230 m) off Fort Fisher. There Rhind and his crew set the fuses and started a fire before escaping to Wilderness. The blast from the explosion, although loud, did little damage to the fort, and two days later Rhind returned to plant a marker buoy as near to Fort Fisher as possible to allow the fleet to bombard the fort at close range. Rear Admiral David Dixon Porter, in his official report to the Navy Department, wrote;

"In conclusion, allow me to draw your attention to Commander Rhind and Lieutenant Preston. They engaged in the most perilous adventure that was, perhaps, ever undertaken. As an incentive to others I beg leave to recommend them for promotion. No one in the squadron considered that their lives would be saved, and Commander Rhind and Lieutenant Preston had made an arrangement to sacrifice themselves in case the vessel was boarded, a thing likely to happen."

The American Civil War ended in April 1865. In 1866 Rhind became a Companion of the First Class of the Military Order of the Loyal Legion of the United States (MOLLUS), a military society composed of the officers of Union armed forces and their descendants. He was assigned MOLLUS insignia number 208.

=== Post-war career ===
After the war, Rhind served as the commanding officer of the receiving ship Vermont at New York City, then as commanding officer of the New York Navy Yard in Brooklyn, New York in 1869–1870, receiving promotion to the rank of captain on March 2, 1870.

Rhind commanded the screw sloop Congress in the European Squadron from 1872 to 1876, receiving promotion to commodore on September 30, 1876, then serving as a lighthouse inspector for the United States Lighthouse Board until 1879. He was president of the Board of Inspection and Survey from 1880 to 1882, and then Governor of the Philadelphia Naval Asylum in 1883. He was promoted to rear admiral on October 30, 1883, the day before his retirement, having reached the mandatory age of 62.

=== Later life ===
In 1890 Rhind became a Veteran Member of the Aztec Club of 1847.

Rhind died at New York City on November 8, 1897. He is buried at the Colden Family Cemetery in Montgomery, New York.

== Namesake ==
The Benham-class destroyer USS Rhind (DD-404), launched in July 1938, was named for Rhind.
