= USS Agawam (1863) =

Double-ended, side-wheel gunboat of the United States Navy

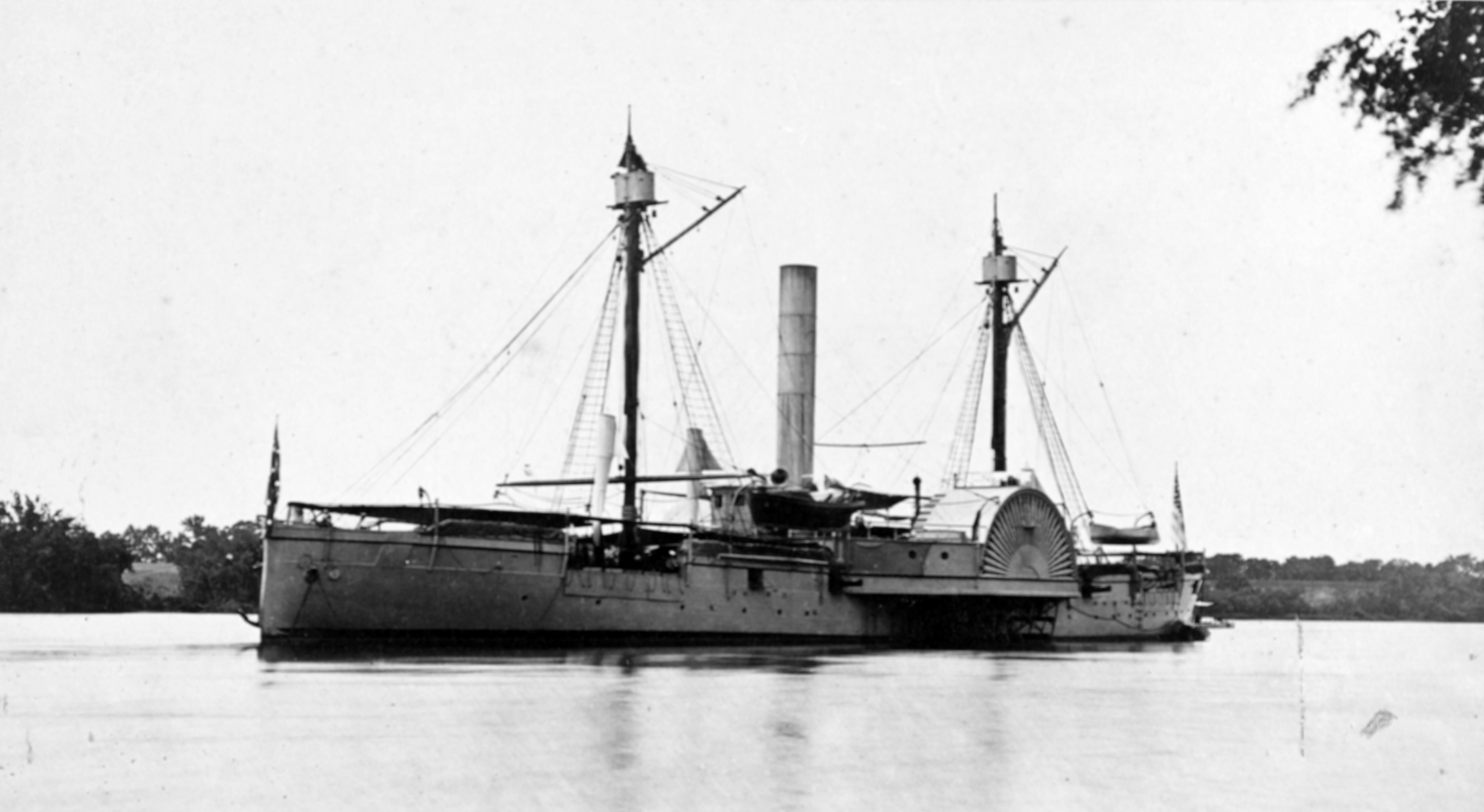
- USS Agawam in the James River, Virginia, July 1864.

History

United States
- Name: USS Agawam
- Namesake: Agawam is an Indian word meaning lowland, marsh, or meadow.
- Owner: United States Navy
- Builder: George W. Lawrence at Portland, Maine
- Laid down: October 1862
- Launched: 21 April 1863
- Commissioned: 9 March 1864
- Decommissioned: 31 March 1867 at Norfolk, Virginia
- Fate: sold 10 October 1867 at Norfolk, Virginia

General characteristics
- Class & type: Sassacus-class gunboat
- Type: "Double-ender" steam gunboat
- Tonnage: 974
- Depth of hold: 11 ft 6 in (3.51 m)
- Propulsion: Steam engine; side wheel-propelled
- Sail plan: 2 × masts available for sail
- Speed: 11 kn (13 mph; 20 km/h)
- Complement: 145 officers and enlisted
- Armament: 2 × 100-pounder rifles; 4 × 9 in (230 mm) smoothbore guns; 2 × 24-pounder smoothbores; 1 × 12-pounder smoothbore; 1 × 12-pounder rifle

USS Agawam was a double-ended, side-wheel gunboat of the United States Navy that served during the American Civil War. She measured 974 tons, with powerful rifled guns and a very fast speed of 11 kn (13 mph; 20 km/h). She served the Union Navy in the Union blockade of the rivers and other waterways of the Confederate States of America.

== Constructed in Portland, Maine ==
Agawam – the first U.S. Navy vessel to carry that name – was built at Portland, Maine, by George W. Lawrence and the Portland Company. She was laid down in October 1862, launched on 21 April 1863, and commissioned on 9 March 1864, Commander Alexander Rhind in command. She was based on the same plans as Sassacus. According to a 2 February 1897, House Report, the shipbuilders put forth a claim against the U.S. Government that despite the total contract price of $164,000 for both the Agawam and the USS Pontoosuc, they had spent $223,826.16 in building the two ships. In 1902, Congress honored the claim and paid the Portland Company $64,698.97 and Lawrence, $13,777.24.

== Civil War service ==
=== Capture of the Chesapeake by Southern agents ===
On 9 December 1863, some three months before Agawam was placed in full commission, Southern agents and sympathizers had boarded the steam packet Chesapeake at New York City under the guise of being passengers bound for Portland, Maine.

Shortly after midnight on the 7th, when the liner had reached a point some 20 mi (32 km) north of the tip of Cape Cod, these men revealed their formerly concealed side arms and took over the ship, killing her second engineer. From there, they took the ship to Canadian waters in the hope that their daring act would provoke Union warships into violating British neutrality and thereby embroil the United States in a war with England.

When word of Chesapeake's capture reached Portland, the deputy collector of customs at that port wired Rear Admiral Francis Gregory, the supervisor of construction of all Union warships then being built in private shipyards, informing him of the loss and requesting permission to arm, man, and send out in pursuit the unfinished but seaworthy Agawam. Temporary arms, officers, and men for the new warship would come from the revenue cutter James C. Dobbin which had arrived at Portland in July.

The Navy's extant records seem to contain no report of Agawam's chase of Chesapeake. The Federal correspondence contains both statements maintaining that she did at least get underway and evidence indicating that she did not.

It was locally reported, however, that due to the cold weather and severe wind, the Agawam in pursuit of the Chesapeake burned more coal than expected and was required to stop at Rockland to resupply. Having made several unsuccessful attempts in the stormy weather to get back out to sea, she changed course and began cruising northward along the coast until impenetrable fog forced her to anchor. But her anchors would not hold and after losing two of them, she turned around and steamed about twenty-four hours back to Portland, arriving there on 24 December.

After being commissioned, Agawam remained in the Portsmouth Navy Yard fitting out until standing down Portsmouth Harbor on 17 March. However, she returned to the yard two days later and entered drydock for repairs before heading back to Portland on 18 April.

=== Assigned to the North Atlantic blockade ===
Assigned to the North Atlantic Blockading Squadron, the gunboat departed Portland on 6 May. Agawam reached Hampton Roads, Virginia on 9 May and two days later stood up the James River to join other Union ships in protecting Benjamin Butler's transports and supply ships which were threatened by torpedoes (naval mines), shore batteries, and a possible attack by Confederate ironclads which were lying in the river above the Confederate batteries of Fort Darling at Drewry's Bluff. The danger lurking in the muddy waters of the James River had recently been emphasized by the sinking of USS Commodore Jones on the 6th while that side-wheel ferryboat was dragging for Southern torpedoes, or, in 20th century parlance, floating and submerged mines.

On the 14th, Rear Admiral Samuel Phillips Lee, the commander of the North Atlantic Blockading Squadron, shifted his flag from Malvern to Agawam since the latter drew less water and thus would enable him to supervise minesweeping operations more closely, and he remained in the new side-wheeler while giving his primary attention to operations in the James during the ensuing month and one-half.

=== Agawam's first taste of fire ===
Agawam's first combat came at dawn on the 18th when she shelled Confederate forces

. . . intrenching the heights at Hewlett's house, commanding Trent's Reach,

a straight stretch of the river flowing east along the northeastern section of Bermuda Hundred. During this time, besides serving as the squadron flagship, she helped to clear the river of mines, was a mobile platform for observation of Confederate activity along both banks of the river, acted as an intelligence and communication clearinghouse, and used her guns to suppress Southern batteries ashore.

From first planning to land a force at Bermuda Hundred, General Butler had been fearful that Confederate warships might descend from Richmond and sink his transports and supply ships. Once his troops were actually ashore on the south side of the river, the general's anxiety was intensified by daily rumors reporting that the South was ready to launch just such an offensive. For instance, late in May, a deserter from the Southern gunboat Hampton warned that

. . . the enemy have now below Drewry's Bluff three ironclads, six smaller gunboats, plated with boiler iron . . . all mounted with torpedoes, and nine fire ships . . . to attack at as early a moment as practicable . . . .

Confident in the ability of his warships, Admiral Lee was eager to meet the Southern squadron and was hopeful that his flotilla might ascend the James past the batteries at Drewry's Bluff and capture Richmond. As a result, he constantly opposed obstructing the channel. However, early in June, Ulysses S. Grant decided to shift the Army of the Potomac from its lines at Cold Harbor across the James to join Butler in operations against Richmond from the south.

=== Blocking the James River ===
This plan made Union control of the river even more important and prompted Washington, D.C., to insist upon blocking the channel. The first stone-laden schooner was sunk on 15 June, and the operation continued until Union Army leaders felt safe from Southern ironclads.

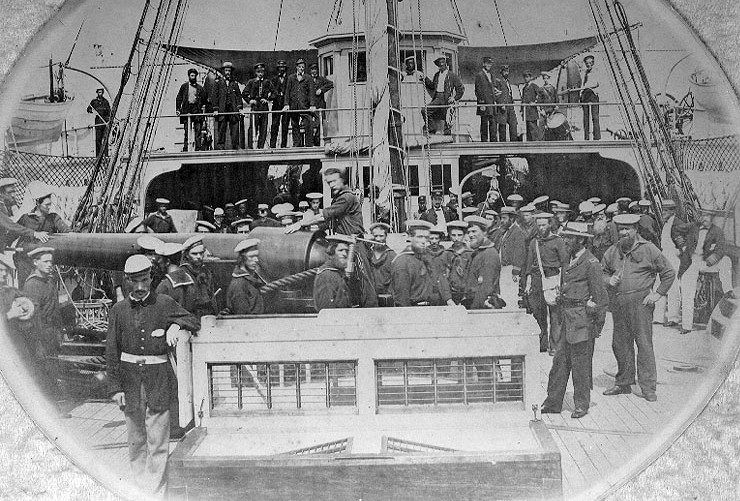
Ship's officers and crewmen pose on deck, while she was serving on the James River, Virginia, August 1864.

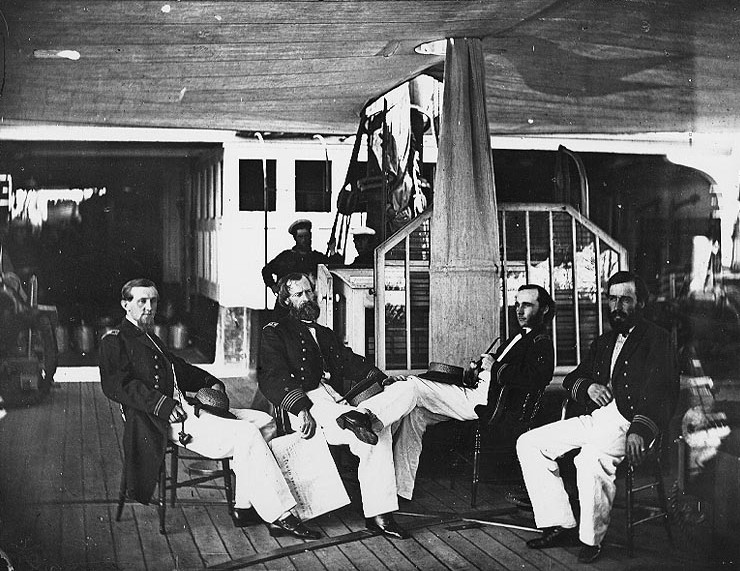
Some of the ship's officers relaxing on deck, while she was serving on the James River, Virginia, in the summer of 1864.

This barrier increased the security of Union shipping on the James and reduced the burden on the Union warships on the river, freeing Admiral Lee to attend to squadron matters elsewhere. As a result, he shifted his flag back to Malvern on the last day of June and returned to Hampton Roads.

Agawam remained upriver where, despite the obstructions, she found ample opportunity to use her fighting skills. The presence of the tremendous concentration of Union troops south of Richmond had goaded defenders of the Confederate capital into desperate measures to interrupt Union shipping on the James.

The day after Admiral Lee left her, Agawam and Mendota fired on a fortified position inside Four Mile Creek, whence Southern five guns had recently fired upon Hunchback, and in the months that followed, frequently engaged batteries hiding along the banks of the strategic stream.

Early in July, Lieutenant George Dewey relieved Rhind in temporary command of the ship – his first command – but Rhind was back when Agawam fought her most memorable battle. About two hours past noon on 13 August, three batteries opened fire on the double-ender almost simultaneously from different locations, beginning an engagement which lasted over four hours before dwindling ammunition forced her to withdraw. During the action, three of Agawam's men were killed and four wounded.

=== Converting Louisiana into a giant bomb ===
Late in November, boiler trouble forced Agawam downstream for extensive repairs. While the ship was being brought back to fighting trim in the Norfolk Navy Yard, Comdr. Rhind left her temporarily to take command of Louisiana, a steamer which had been selected to perform an unusual and seemingly important task. Rhind took with him a carefully selected group of volunteers from Agawam to man his new ship. They boarded Louisiana at Beaufort, North Carolina, and took her to waters of Wilmington, North Carolina, for use as a giant bomb to help reduce the defenses of Fort Fisher which guarded that city, the only major port still open to Confederate blockade runners.

After several days of delay because of stormy weather, Rhind took the ship close aboard Fort Fisher on the night of 23–24 December 1864. Her crew then set her ablaze, left the ship, and managed to row to safety before Louisiana exploded.

=== Failed attack on Fort Fisher ===
The concussion failed to detonate the Fort Fisher magazine, and the ensuing amphibious attack proved to be abortive. The troops who went ashore on Christmas Eve to storm the Southern stronghold reembarked the next day and headed back toward Hampton Roads. Rhind and the band of volunteers returned to Agawam which was still undergoing repairs.

The work continued through mid-February, and the gunboat finally put to sea on the 16th. She entered Pamlico Sound, North Carolina, two days later and operated in the island waters of that state through the end of the Civil War.

== Post-war service and disposal ==
Following the war, Agawam operated along the Atlantic coast between Florida and the Virginia Capes for almost two years. She was decommissioned at Norfolk, Virginia, on 31 March 1867.

Agawam and four other Navy ships were sold at auction at the Norfolk Navy Yard on 10 October 1867. Agawam was sold without her engine and related machinery. She was purchased by J. Parner & Co. for $3,700. By March 1868, she was owned by Nehemiah Gibson of Boston. He entered into a contract with Boston merchants Flint & Hall on 12 March 1868 to convert the former gunboat into a four-masted schooner to carry lumber. The ship left Norfolk, under tow, headed to Baltimore on 2 April 1868. The conversion was done at the Booze Brothers shipyard in Canton, Maryland, where work was underway in May 1868. It was reported at the time that she was to sail to Buenos Aires and not return to the United States.
