= 13th Indiana Cavalry Regiment =

Part of the Union Army in the American Civil War

13th Indiana Cavalry Regiment 131st Indiana Infantry Regiment
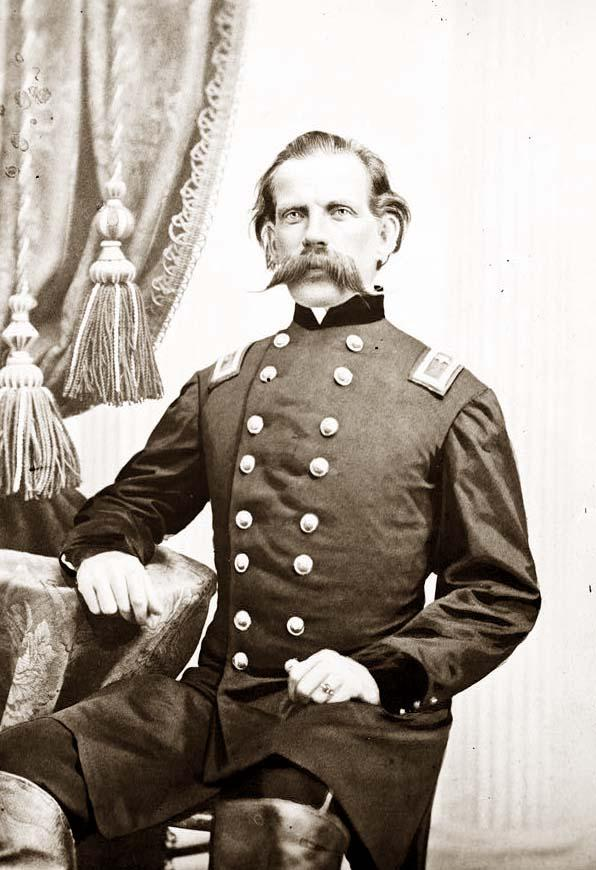
- Brevet Brigadier General Gilbert M.L. Johnson, 13th Indiana Cavalry Regiment.
- Active: December 23, 1863 - November 18, 1865
- Country: United States
- Allegiance: United States; Indiana
- Branch: Union Army
- Type: Cavalry
- Engagements: American Civil War: Franklin-Nashville Campaign; Skirmish at Overall Creek; Third Battle of Murfreesboro; Battle of Nashville; Skirmish at Paint Rock Bridge (detachment); Battle of Decatur; Battle of Nashville; Mobile campaign (1865); Battle of Egypt Station (Grierson's Raid); Siege of Spanish Fort; Battle of Fort Blakeley

Commanders
- Colonel: Gilbert M.L. Johnson

The 13th Indiana Cavalry Regiment was a cavalry regiment raised in the state of Indiana during the American Civil War. The regiment, like many other units in the Union Army was originally raised as infantry and designated as the 131st Indiana Infantry Regiment, however, the regiment would later be converted to cavalry. The 13th Indiana Cavalry was the last and final regiment of cavalry raised in the state of Indiana during the war.

== Service ==
Recruiting for the regiment began as early as September, 1863. The regiment was organized in Indianapolis, Kokomo, and New Albany from December 23, 1863, to April 29, 1864, with Gilbert M. L. Johnson elected as the regiment's Colonel. Johnson had previously served with the 2nd Indiana Cavalry Regiment and had briefly served as the Lieutenant Colonel of the 11th Indiana Cavalry Regiment.

The regiment left Indiana for Nashville, Tennessee as dismounted cavalry armed with infantry muskets on April 30, 1864. The regiment was stationed at Nashville until May 31, 1864, when it was ordered to Huntsville, Alabama where it would be garrisoned until November,1864. The regiment repulsed Confederate General Abraham Buford II's attack on Huntsville from September 30-October 1, 1864. After this period the regiment was split into 2 battalions.

On October 16, 1864, companies A, C, D, F, H, and I moved to Louisville in order to draw horses and equipment for the regiment. The regiment moved to Nashville and to La Vergne on November 30, 1864. On December 1, 1864, companies A, C, D, F, H, and I moved to Murfreesboro and then to Owens Cross Roads. Companies A, C, D, F, H, and I of the 13th Indiana Cavalry were involved in the Third Battle of Murfreesboro from December 5–12, 1864. Companies A, C, D, F, H, and I were later stationed at Murfreesboro from December 8–9 and again from December 13–14. The companies moved to Nashville on December 19, 1864, before going into winter quarters.

Companies B, E, G, K, and L participated in the Battle of Decatur on October 26–29, 1864 and the Battle of Nashville on December 15–16, 1864. These companies later moved to Hillsboro, Alabama December 29 and Leighton, Alabama on December 30, 1864. The regiment was regrouped and moved to Vicksburg, Mississippi, to New Orleans, and then to Mobile Bay from February 11-March 23, 1865. The regiment participated in the Mobile Campaign and fought at both the Battle of Spanish Fort and the Battle of Fort Blakeley from March 26-April 9, 1865. The regiment was present for the capture of Mobile, Alabama on April 12, 1865. The regiment's last engagement was as part of General Benjamin Grierson's raid through Alabama, Georgia and Mississippi April 17-May 22, 1865 (not to be confused with Grierson's Raid in 1863). The regiment had garrison duty as part of the Military Division of the Mississippi until November. The regiment was mustered out of federal service in Vicksburg, Mississippi on November 18, 1865.

Original Organization of Regiment
Company	Primary Place of Recruitment	Earliest Captain
A	Huntington County	Isaac DeLong
B	Floyd and Harrison counties	Jacob Herman
C	Madison and Jennings counties	David McClure
D	Floyd and Harrison counties	Frederick Leslie
E	Floyd, Orange, and Harrison counties	Charles F. Bruder
F	Orange and Harrison counties	William P. Coffin
G	Allen, Howard, and Adams counties	James C. Wilson
H	Lawence, Crawford, and Spencer counties	Richard E. Weathers
I	Shelby, Hancock, Rush, and Spencer counties	George Muth
K	Vigo and Marshall counties	William A. Hayes
L	Perry and Harrison counties	John T. Wheeler
M	Clark and Floyd counties	Dillon Bridges

== Casualties ==
The regiment lost a total of 142 soldiers during its service: 1 Officer and 14 Enlisted men were killed and mortally wounded while 2 Officers and 125 Enlisted men were killed via disease.

== Commanders ==
- Gilbert M. L. Johnson: April 20, 1864 - November 18, 1865.

== Notable people ==
- Gilbert M. L. Johnson: A prominent citizen of Indiana, Johnson had originally served as a Lieutenant in the 2nd Indiana Cavalry Regiment, the first complete cavalry regiment raised in Indiana. Johnson also previously served in the 11th Indiana Cavalry Regiment before being promoted to the rank of Colonel and given command of the 13th Indiana Cavalry.
- Edward F. Reid: Reid served as a private in Company E, 3rd Indiana Cavalry Regiment and fought at the Battle of South Mountain, the Battle of Antietam, the Battle of Fredericksburg, the Battle of Chancellorsville, and the Battle of Gettysburg. Reird was later promoted to lead Company C after the resignation of Captain David McClure.

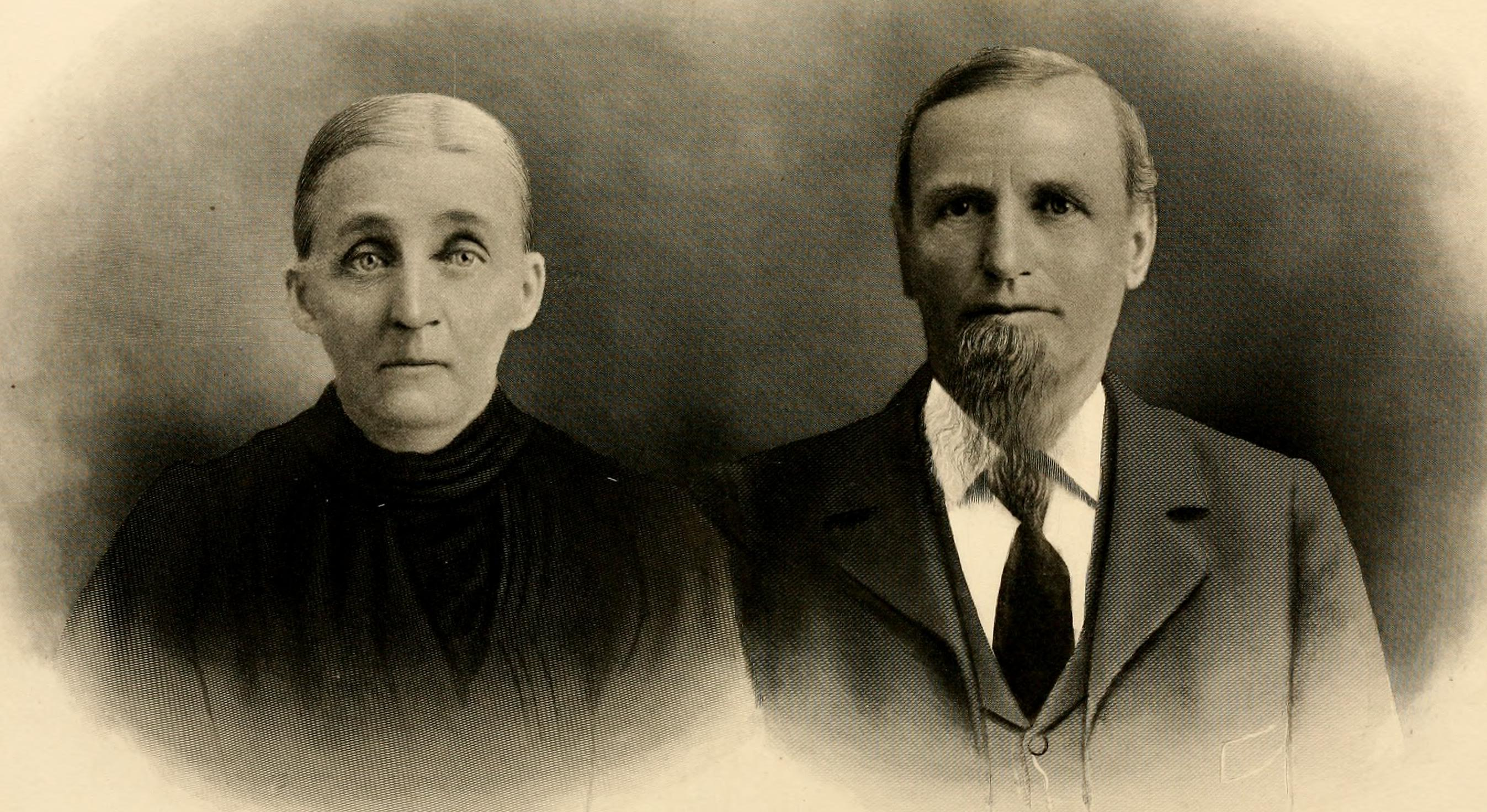
George W. Burket (right) with his wife Margaret Burket c. 1910–1913. Burket served as a private in Company I. He had previously served in Company M, 16th Indiana Infantry Regiment.

== See also ==
- Indiana in the American Civil War
- List of Indiana units in the American Civil War
