= 5th Indiana Cavalry Regiment =

5th Regiment Indiana Volunteer Cavalry (90th Indiana Infantry Regiment)
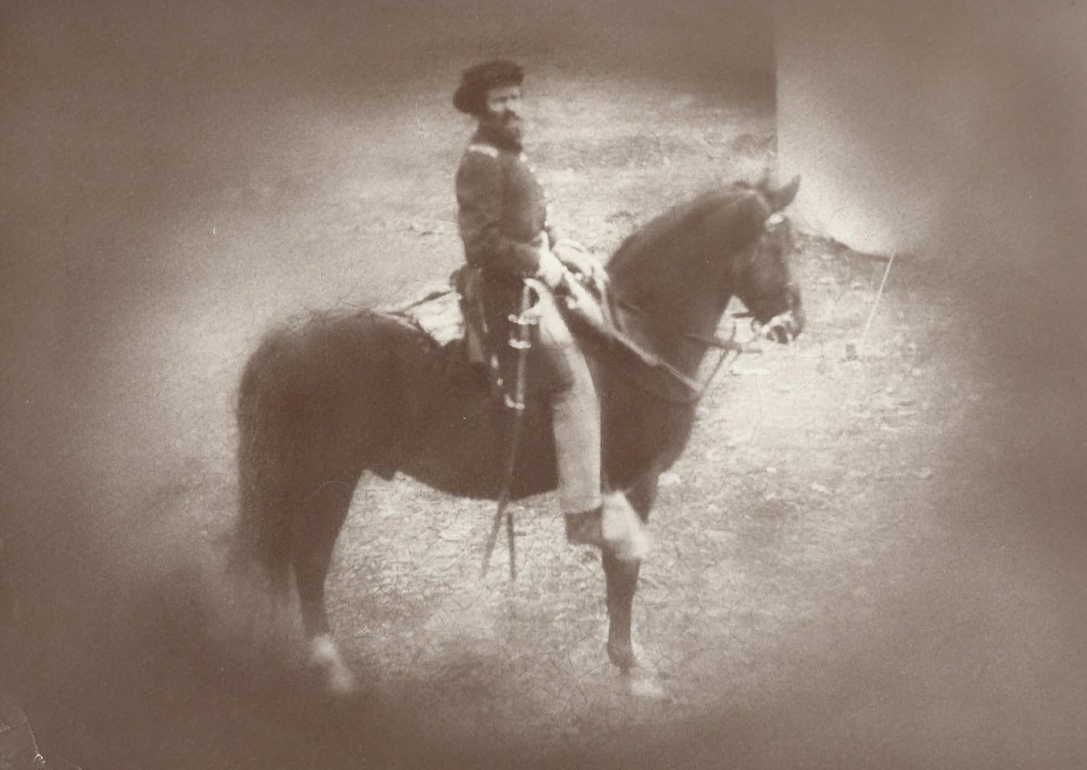
- Captain Mathew Simpson Clegg of Company M
- Active: August 22, 1862 – June 16, 1865
- Country: United States
- Allegiance: Union
- Branch: Cavalry
- Engagements: Morgan's Christmas Raid; Morgan's Raid; Battle of Buffington Island; Knoxville Campaign; Atlanta campaign; Battle of Resaca; Battle of Dallas; Battle of New Hope Church; Battle of Allatoona; Battle of Kennesaw Mountain; Stoneman's Raid

Commanders
- Notable commanders: Felix William Graham; Thomas Harvey Butler

The 5th Indiana Cavalry Regiment was a cavalry regiment during the American Civil War. It was originally mustered as an infantry regiment as the 90th Indiana Infantry Regiment.

== Service ==
The 5th Indiana Cavalry was organized at Indianapolis, Indiana as the 90th Indiana Infantry Regiment beginning on August 22, 1862, and mustered in for three-year service under the command of Colonel Felix William Graham. Robert R. Stewart was commissioned October 18, 1862 to command the regiment, but he declined.

The regiment was attached to District of Western Kentucky, Department of the Ohio, to June 1863. 1st Brigade, 3rd Division, XXIII Corps, Department of the Ohio, to August 1863. 2nd Brigade, 4th Division, XXIII Corps, to October 1863. 4th Brigade, 4th Division, XXIII Corps, to November 1863. 2nd Brigade, 2nd Division, Cavalry Corps, Department of the Ohio, to May 1864. 1st Brigade, Cavalry Division, XXIII Corps, to July 1864. 2nd Brigade, Cavalry Division, XXIII Corps, to August 1864. Dismounted Cavalry Brigade, Cavalry Division, XXIII Corps, to September 1864. 1st Brigade, Cavalry Division, XXIII Corps, to September 1864. Louisville, Kentucky, to November 1864. 1st Brigade, 6th Division, Wilson's Cavalry Corps, Military Division of the Mississippi, to December 1864. 2nd Brigade, 6th Division, Cavalry corps, Military Division of the Mississippi, to June 1865. The 5th Indiana Cavalry mustered out of service June 16, 1865.

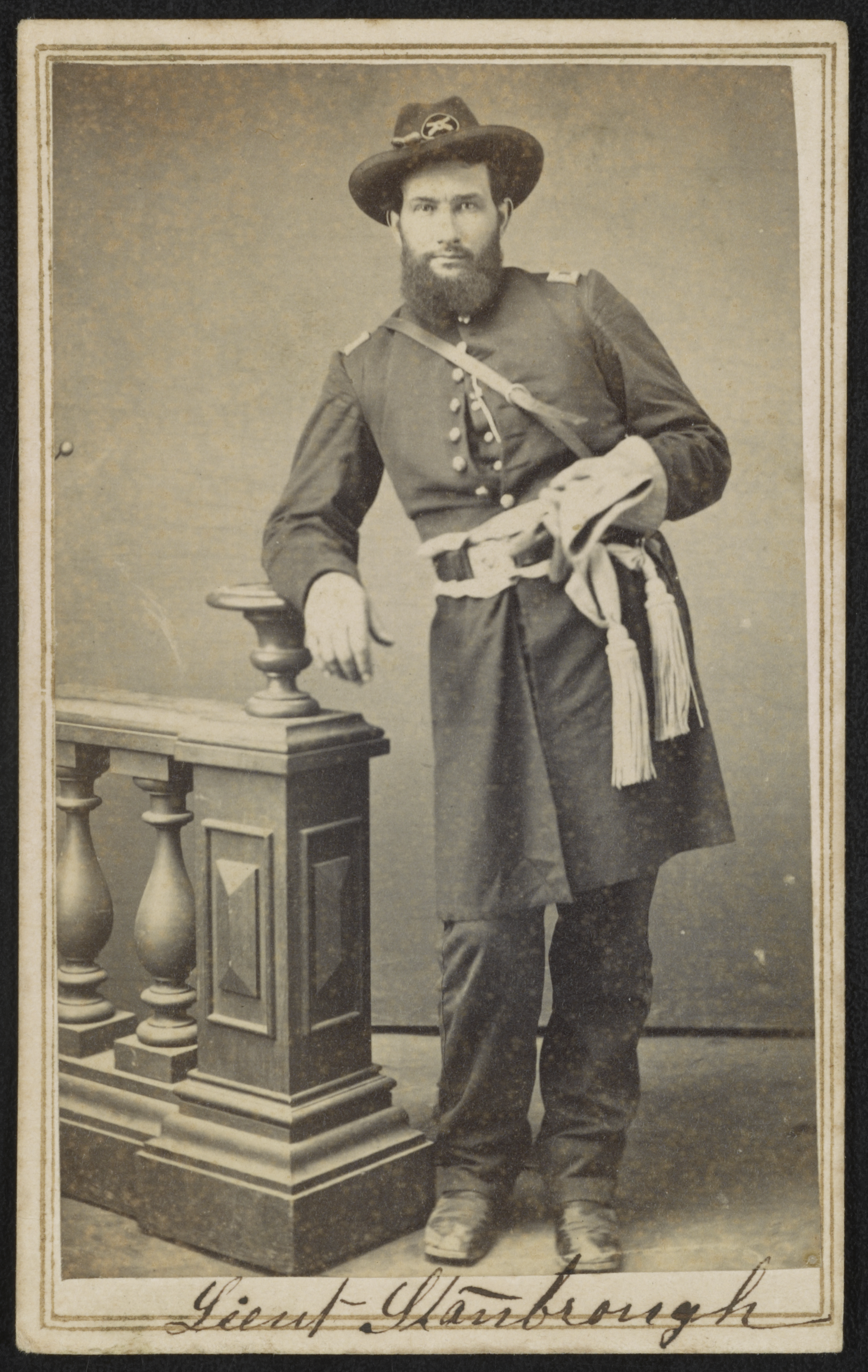
Lieutenant Solomon Stanbrough of Company C, 5th Indiana Cavalry Regiment. Stanbrough would later serve in Company F, as well as the 1st Battalion Tennessee Light Artillery, Battery "D", and later the 148th Indiana Infantry Regiment.

Original Organization of Regiment by Company
Company	Primary Place of Recruitment	Earliest Captain
A	Grant, Howard, Huntington, Madison and Hamilton Counties.	James A. Stretch
B	Wayne County.	John S. Lyle
C	Pike, Owen, Henry, Fayette and Starke Counties.	Benjamin Farley
D	Allen County.	Harry A. Whitman
E	Washington County.	James P. Banta
F	Johnson, Morgan and Madison Counties.	Felix William Graham
G	Hancock County.	Reuben Alexander Riley
H	Decatur and Ripley Counties.	Thomas Harvey Butler
I	Porter, Lake and Fulton Counties.	Ephraim N. Banks
K	Pulaski, Cass, Fulton, Jackson and La Porte Counties.	Sidney W. Sea
L	Tippecanoe County.	Chauncey H. Thompson
M	Clark, Kosciuko, Grant, Marion and Steuben Counties.	John McLean Ammons

== Detailed service ==
The regiment moved to Louisville, Kentucky, on February 28, 1863, and then proceeded to Glasgow, Kentucky, between March 4 and 11. Prior to this, Companies C, F, and I had already moved to Louisville in December 1862, then advanced to Munfordville, Kentucky, and joined the regiment at Glasgow in March 1863.

From December 22, 1862, to January 2, 1863, the regiment participated in operations against Morgan in Kentucky, with Companies C, F, and I actively involved. On December 25, 1862, they engaged in action along the Burkesville Road near Green's Chapel. Following this, the regiment conducted scout duty from Glasgow toward the Cumberland River until April 17, 1863, and then undertook an expedition to the Cumberland River from April 18 to 22, which included a skirmish at Cumberland River on April 18 and a presence at Celina on April 19.

The regiment continued scouting near Glasgow until June 22, with notable engagements at Marrow Bone Creek, Tennessee, on May 18, and near Edmonton, Kentucky, on June 7. From June 8 to 10, they undertook an expedition from Glasgow to Burkesville and the Tennessee state line, including a battle at Kettle Creek on June 9. On June 22, the regiment moved to Tompkinsville, and from July 4 to 26, they pursued Morgan, participating in the engagement at Buffington Island, Ohio, on July 19.

Between July 27 and August 8, the regiment marched from Louisville to Glasgow. They then took part in Burnside's Campaign in eastern Tennessee from August 16 to October 17, occupying Knoxville on September 2. They engaged in operations at Rheatown on September 12, Kingsport on September 18, Bristol, Virginia, on September 19, and the engagements at Zollicoffer on September 20–21, Jonesborough on September 21, Hall's Ford on the Watauga River on September 22, Carter's Depot and Blountsville on the same day, and Blue Springs on October 10. Additional movements included Henderson's Mill and Rheatown on October 11, and Blountsville and Bristol on October 14–15. The regiment participated in the Warm Springs operations on October 20 and 26.

During the Knoxville Campaign from November 4 to December 23, they endured the siege of Knoxville from November 17 to December 5, with engagements at Log Mountain on December 3, Walker's Ford on the Clinch River on December 5, Bean's Station on December 14, Blain's Cross Roads from December 16 to 19, Clinch River on December 21, and subsequent operations along the Morristown Road on January 16, 1864. They also fought at Kimbrough's Mills on the same day and engaged in operations around Dandridge on January 16–17 and again on January 26–28, including a skirmish near Fair Garden on January 27.

Following these actions, the regiment marched to Knoxville and then to Cumberland Gap between January 29 and February 10. From February 17 to 26, they marched to Mount Sterling, Kentucky, and remained on duty at Mount Sterling, Paris, and Nicholasville until May 1. The regiment then moved to Tunnel Hill, Georgia, from May 1 to 12, and participated in the Atlanta Campaign from May through September.

During the Atlanta Campaign, they fought at Varnell's Station on May 7 and 9, participated in a demonstration on Dalton from May 9 to 13, and fought at the Battle of Resaca on May 14–15. They engaged at Cassville on May 19, and conducted operations along Pumpkin Vine Creek and battles near Dallas, New Hope Church, and Allatoona Hills from May 25 to June 5, including actions at Mt. Zion Church on May 27–28, Stoneman's Hill on May 29, and operations around Marietta and Kennesaw Mountain from June 10 to July 2. Notable engagements included Lost Mountain on June 15–17, Allatoona on June 23–25 and 30, Nickajack Creek from July 2–5, Mitchell's Cross Roads on July 4, and the Chattahoochee River from July 5–17. They also fought at Campbellton on July 10, Marietta on July 19, and participated in Stoneman's Raid to Macon from July 27 to August 6, with actions at Clinton and Macon on July 30. During this raid, most of the regiment was captured at Sunshine Church, Hillsboro, on July 30–31.

The remaining dismounted men were on guard duty at Decatur and Atlanta until September 13. Afterward, the regiment was ordered to Louisville, Kentucky, where they performed guard duty until January 1865. From January 17 to February 12, they marched to Pulaski, Tennessee, where they performed post duty and engaged in operations against guerrillas in the area until June. Additionally, they took part in an expedition from Pulaski to New Market, Alabama, from May 5 to 13.

== Casualties ==
The regiment lost a total of 230 men during service; 1 officer and 40 enlisted men killed or mortally wounded, 1 officer and 188 enlisted men died of disease.

== Commanders ==
- Colonel Robert R. Stewart: Declined command.
- Colonel Felix W. Graham: December 10, 1862 - December 15, 1863.
- Colonel Thomas Harvey Butler: December 16, 1863 - June 27, 1865.

== Notable members ==
- Louis J. Bruner: Served as a private in Company H. Medal of Honor recipient for action on December 2, 1863, at Walker's Ford, Tennessee.
- John O'Neill: Served as a lieutenant in Company I. Before joining the 5th Indiana Cavalry O'neill was an Irish Republican and part of the Fenian Brotherhood. O'Neill is best known for his activities leading the Fenian raids into Canada in 1866 and 1871. O'Neill was the commander of the Fenian Brotherhood during the Battle of Ridgeway.
- John Woolley: Began his service as a first lieutenant in the 2nd Indiana Cavalry on October 3, 1861, and within a few days was transferred to the 5th Indiana Cavalry. He was promoted to major on March 27, 1862, and to lieutenant colonel on March 8, 1864. President Andrew Johnson nominated Woolley for appointment to the grade of brevet brigadier general of volunteers on January 13, 1866.

== See also ==
- List of Indiana Civil War regiments
- Indiana in the Civil War
