= Bridgeland =

Bridgeland may refer to:

== Places ==
- Bridgeland Community, a community in Harris County, Texas, United States
- Bridgeland, Calgary, a neighbourhood in Calgary, Alberta
- Bridgeland, Utah, an unincorporated community in Duchesne County, Utah, United States.

== Other uses ==
- Bridgeland (surname)
- Bridgeland/Memorial (C-Train), C-Train station in Calgary, Alberta, Canada
