= 11th Indiana Cavalry Regiment =

US unit of the American Civil War (1863–65)

11th Indiana Cavalry Regiment 126th Indiana Infantry Regiment
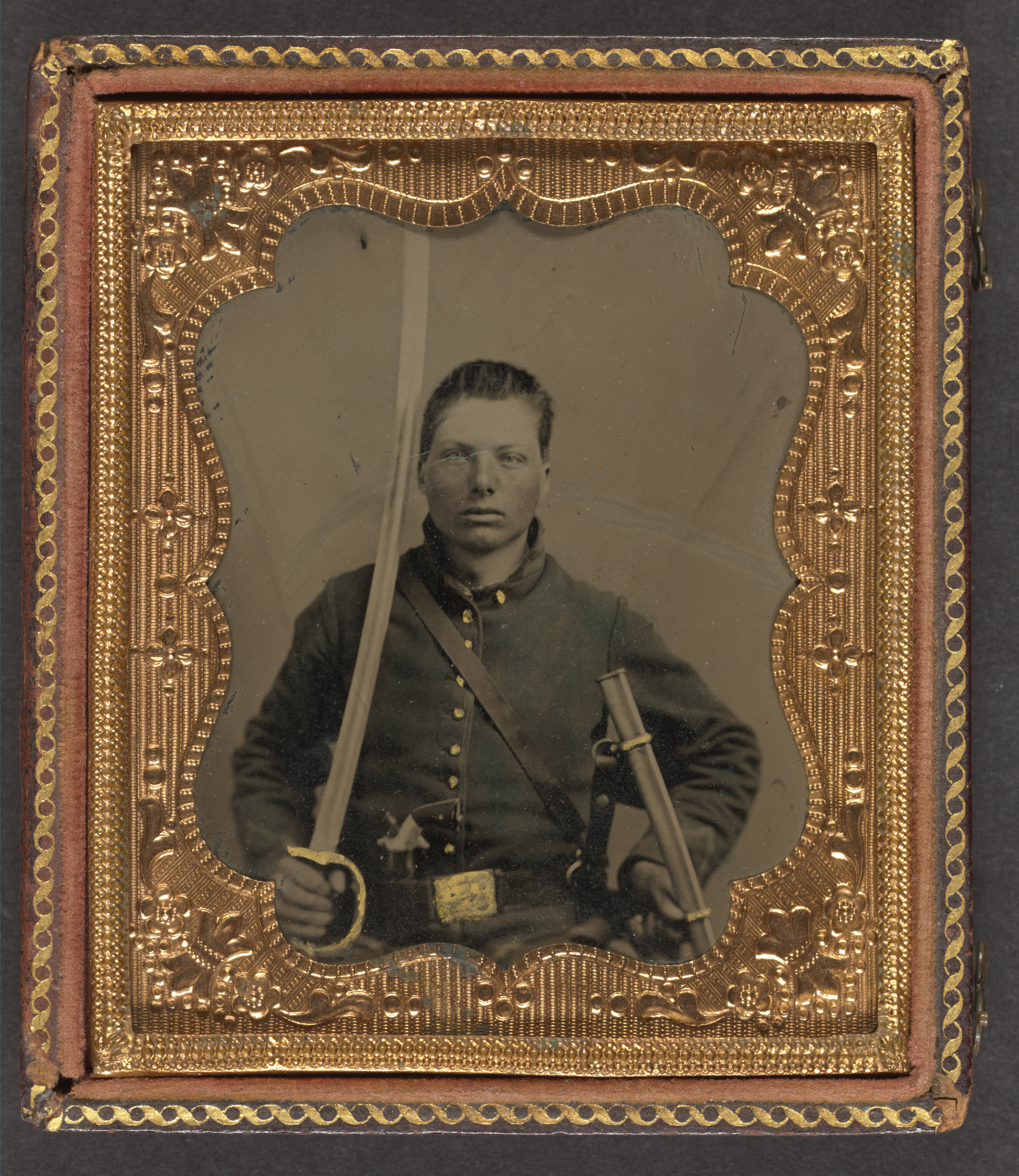
- Elias Teeple of Company C, 11th Indiana Cavalry Regiment in Union uniform with saber and Smith and Wesson revolver.
- Active: November 10, 1863 - September 19, 1865.
- Country: United States of America
- Allegiance: Union Army
- Branch: Infantry & Cavalry
- Equipment: Maynard Carbine
- Engagements: American Civil War: Battle of Decatur; Franklin-Nashville Campaign; Battle of Columbia; Battle of Franklin; Battle of Nashville; Wilson's Raid

Commanders
- Colonel: Robert R. Stewart
- Colonel: Abram Sharra

The 11th Indiana Cavalry Regiment was a cavalry regiment raised in the state of Indiana during the American Civil War. The regiment was originally mustered in as an infantry regiment and designated as the 126th Indiana Infantry Regiment. The regiment was quickly converted to cavalry and redesignated as the 11th Indiana Cavalry Regiment.

== Service ==
The regiment was organized at Lafayette, Kokomo, and Indianapolis, from November 10, 1863, to April 2, 1864. The regiment was officially mustered in on March 1, 1864, as the 11th Indiana Cavalry containing 1,246, officers and enlisted men. The commanding officers of the unit were Colonel Robert R. Stewart of Terre Haute, Lieutenant Colonel Abram Sharra of Evansville, and Major Jehu C. Hannum of Delphi.

From May 7 to June 1, 1864, the regiment was posted in Nashville, Tennessee. The regiment then moved into Alabama, where it was engaged in guarding railroads of the Memphis and Charleston Railroad and was headquartered in Larkinsville, Alabama. During much of this time the regiment had no saddles and had yet to be mounted.

On November 21, 1864, the regiment was officially attached to the Fifth Cavalry Division under the command of Brigadier General Edward Hatch. The regiment was present and took part in the Franklin–Nashville campaign and participated in the pursuit of Hood's retreating army at the Battle of Decatur. The 11th Indiana Cavalry would again be dismounted and placed on duty near Gravely Springs, Alabama, in January 1865 during Wilson's Raid and remain there until February 7. The regiment was later moved to Eastport, Mississippi and remained there (presumably still afoot) until mid May. The regiment was later transferred to the Trans-Mississippi was remounted for duty in Missouri and Kansas. The regiment was officially mustered out of service at Fort Leavenworth, on September 19, 1865.

Original Organization of Regiment
Company	Primary Place of Recruitment	Earliest Captain
A	Tippecanoe County	Isaac L. LaFlesh
B	Jay, Greene and Pulaski Counties	Elias Showalter
C	Switzerland, Adams, Allen and Wells Counties	Edgar A. Henderson
D	Vigo County	Carlton A. Goodwin
E	Howard County	John M. Garrett
F	Parke and Howard Counties	Daniel A. Porter
G	Sullivan, Clark and Howard Counties	Robert H. Crowder
H	Boone and Tippecanoe	Mason S. Hamilton
I	Tippecanoe, White and Clark Counties	Smith Lee
K	Warren, Fountain, Daviess and Montgomery Counties	Adelbert D. Lee
L	Wabash County	Hiram Lindsey
M	Carroll, Montgomery and Clinton Counties	William B. Givens

== Casualties and losses ==
The 11th Indiana Cavalry Regiment lost a total of 174 men during its service: 2 Officers and 11 Enlisted men killed and mortally wounded and 1 Officer and 160 Enlisted men by disease.

== Notable people ==
- Frank Doster: Served as a private in Company M. Doster would go on to become the chief justice of the Kansas Supreme Court from January 11, 1897, to January 12, 1903.
- Gilbert M. L. Johnson: Johnson was commissioned as Lieutenant Colonel of the regiment in March 1864. One month later Johnson was promoted to the rank of Colonel and given command of the 13th Indiana Cavalry Regiment.
