= Streetcars in Indianapolis =

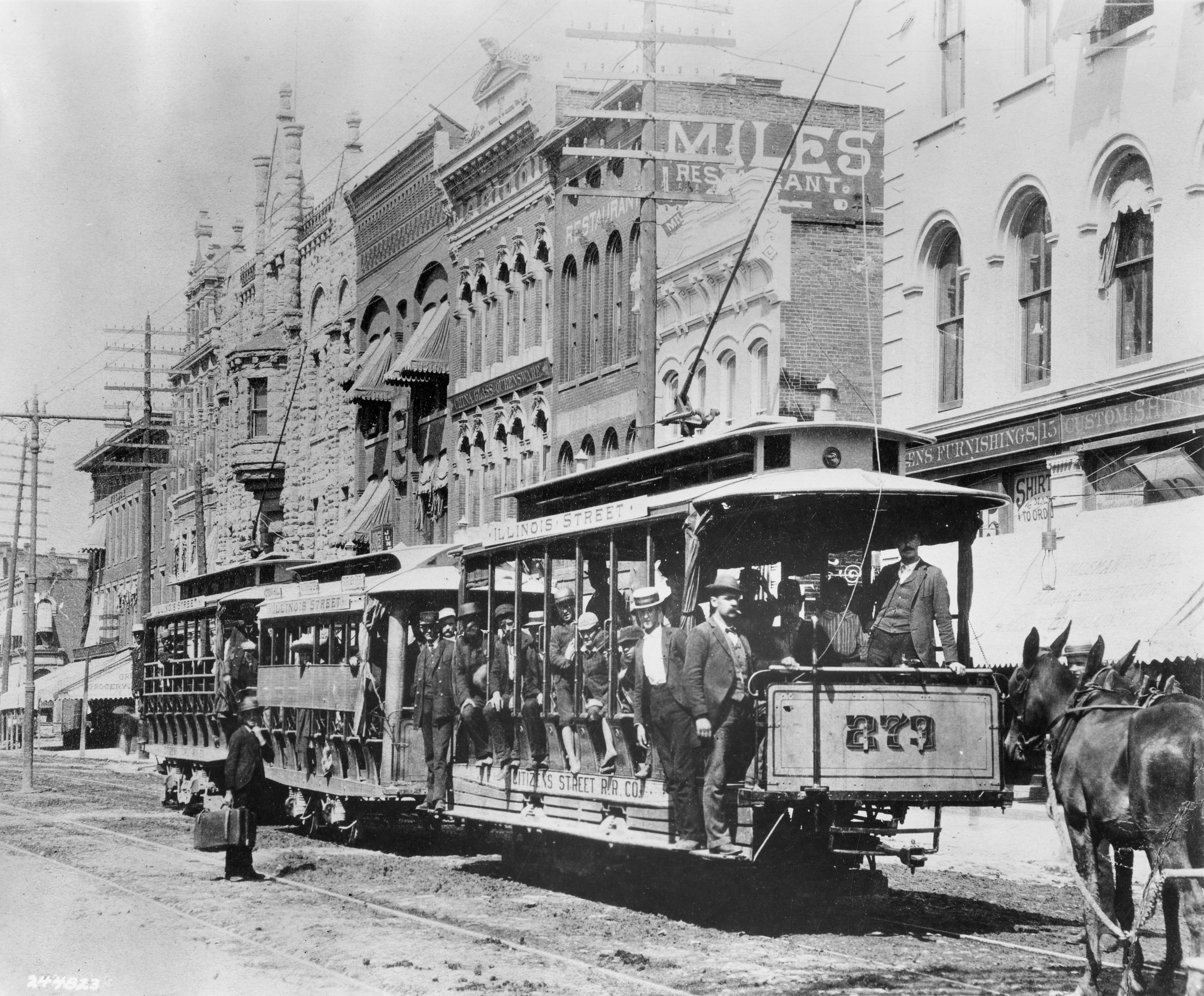
Electric streetcars on Illinois Street in 1896

The streetcar system in Indianapolis, Indiana, was the city's original public transit system, evolving from horsecar lines that opened in 1864 and running through 1953. Mirroring its status as a hub of railroad activity, electric railways also concentrated services in Indianapolis with both a large system of local trolleys as well as a widespread network of interurbans.

== Horsecars ==
Public transit arrived in Indianapolis on October 3, 1864, in the form of 12-seat mule-drawn streetcars which began operating between Union Station and Military Park. Citizens' Street Railway Company, owned by John A. Bridgland and R.B. Catherwood, managed several streetcar lines running on a hub-and-spoke system radiating from downtown Indianapolis to outlying neighborhoods. Early lines were established on Virginia Avenue, Massachusetts Avenue, and Fort Wayne Avenue.

As electrification took over as the motive power for Indianapolis's streetcar operations, some horsecar tracks were left in place and buried via subsequent road repaving.

== Electrification ==
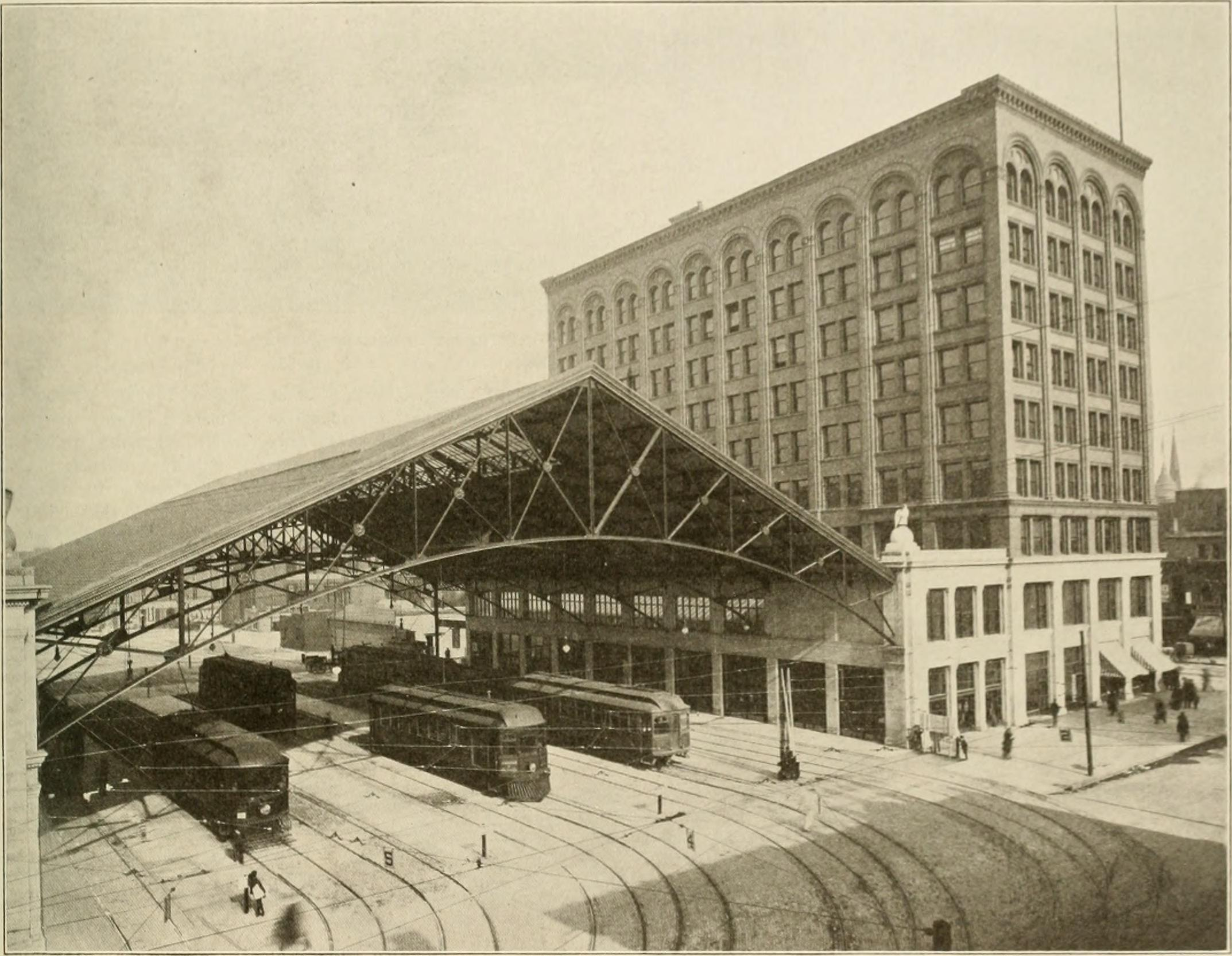
Indianapolis Traction Terminal, 1905

The first electric streetcar began operation on June 18, 1890, replacing the last of the mule-drawn streetcars in 1894. Electrification of the city's streetcar system dramatically improved efficiency and expediency, allowing residents to live further from the civic and business center of downtown. The development of several streetcar suburbs occurred during this time, including Irvington, Riverside, and Woodruff Place.

=== Interurbans ===
On January 1, 1900, the first interurban arrived in Indianapolis from Greenwood, Indiana. To accommodate the growing popularity of interurban travel, the Indianapolis Traction Terminal opened in September 1904, serving all but one of the 13 interurban lines converging in the city. As the busiest interurban station in the world, the Indianapolis Traction Terminal was the hub for Indiana's extensive 1,825-mile (2,937 km) interurban network. At the height of ridership, the terminal served more than 600 trains daily and seven million passengers annually. As automobiles became increasingly prevalent, the interurbans' popularity waned. The terminal served its last interurban in September 1941.

=== Subsequent owners ===
After the bankruptcy of Citizens' Street Railway, the Indianapolis Street Railway Company purchased the operations in 1899 and began running streetcars. The company purchased the Broad Ripple line in 1902. The railroad's assets were wholly leased to the Indianapolis Traction and Terminal Company starting in 1903, and the two companies would eventually merge under the Indianapolis Street Railway Company name in 1919. The new company was acquired by the Terre Haute, Indianapolis and Eastern Traction Company in 1920.

Despite hard years of deferred maintenance during the Depression, the Indianapolis' streetcars continued to run. Indianapolis Railways, Inc. purchased the city's operations in 1932. The company would go on to convert some lines to trackless trolley.

== Decline ==
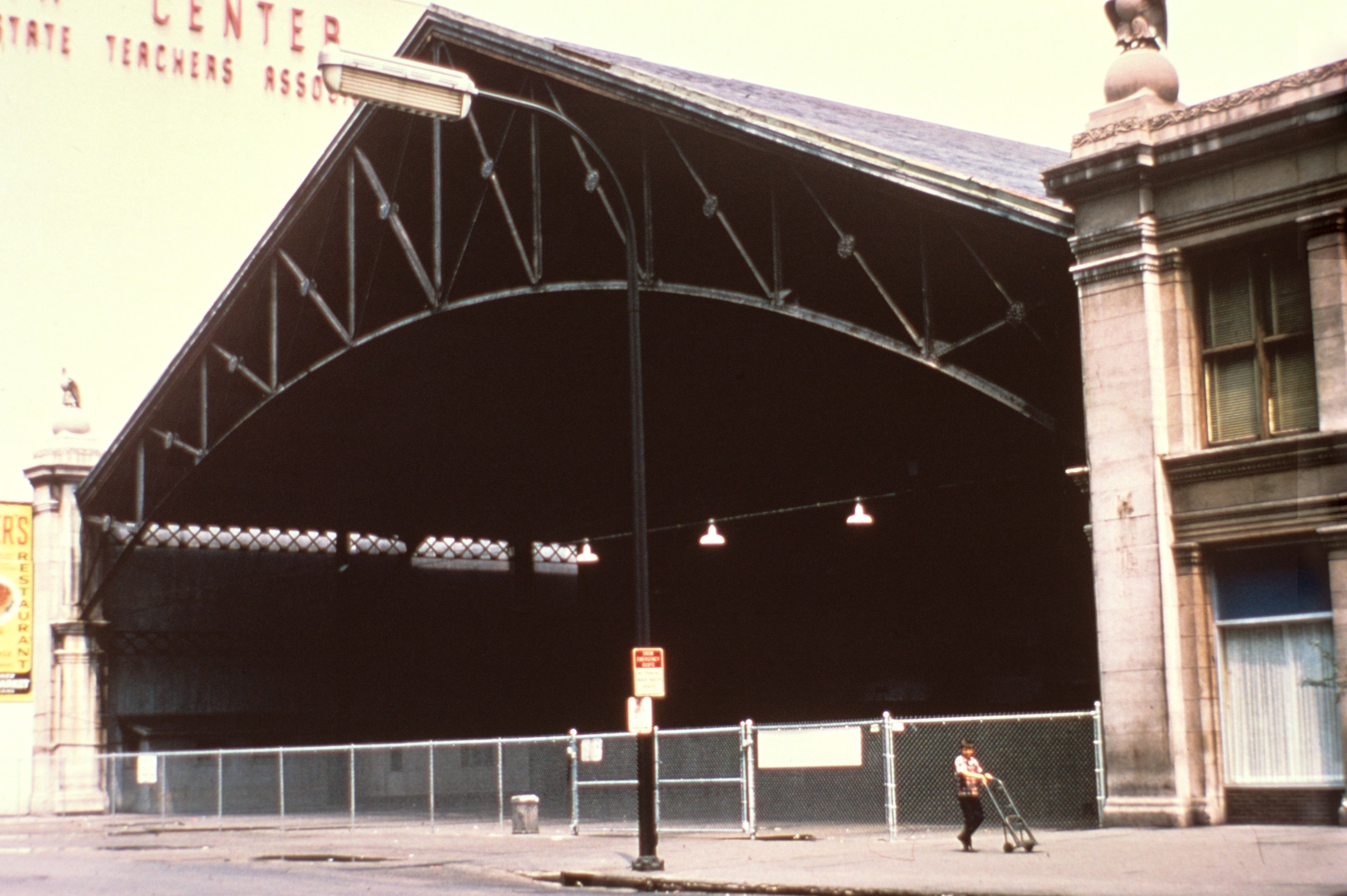
The disused Traction Terminal

Like most American cities following World War II, Indianapolis's electric streetcar ridership declined as personal automobile ownership increased. In 1952, more than 400 public transit vehicles traveled more than 43,000 miles (69,000 km) daily, providing 72 million passenger trips annually. The city's final streetcar ran on January 6, 1953, and the system was decommissioned, replaced by trackless trolleys and motor buses.

== See also ==
- Indianapolis streetcar strike of 1913
- Transportation in Indianapolis
- List of streetcar systems in the United States
