= Gilbert M. L. Johnson =

Gilbert Marquis LaFayette Johnson
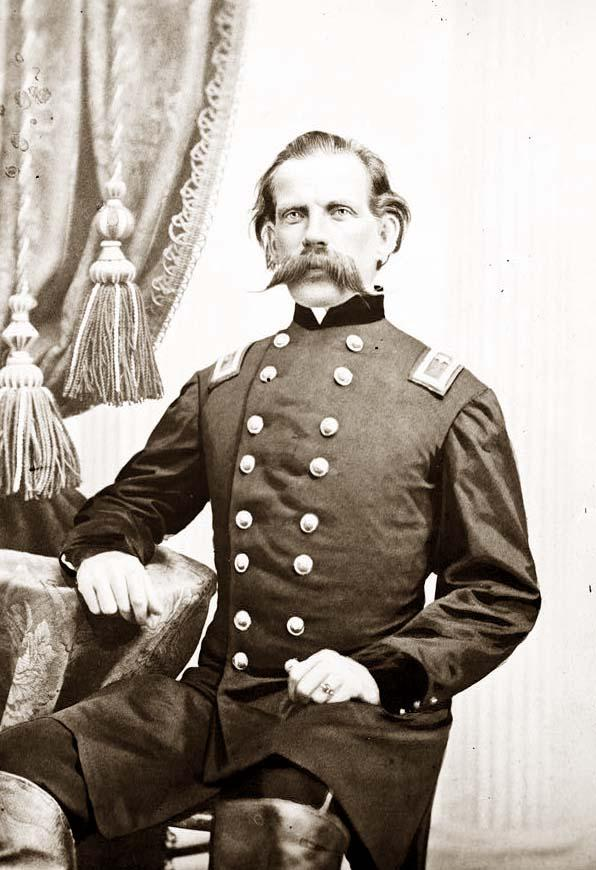
- Bvt. Brig. Gen. G.M.L. Johnson
- Born: November 4, 1837; Indiana
- Died: January 9, 1871 (aged 33); Huntsville, Alabama
- Burial place: Maple Hill Cemetery (Huntsville, Alabama)
- Military career
- Allegiance: United States of America; Union
- Branch: (United States) Union Army
- Rank: Colonel; Brevet Brigadier General
- Unit: 2nd Indiana Cavalry Regiment
- Commands: 13th Indiana Cavalry Regiment
- Conflicts: American Civil War

Gilbert Marquis LaFayette Johnson (November 4, 1837 – January 9, 1871) was an officer in the Union Army from Indiana during the American Civil War, reaching the rank of colonel. In 1866, he was nominated and confirmed for appointment to the grade of brevet brigadier general.

In October 1861, he was commissioned a first lieutenant in the 2nd Indiana Cavalry Regiment, the first complete cavalry regiment raised in Indiana. The regiment served in Kentucky in the winter of 1861 and 1862, and Johnson was promoted to captain in April 1862, serving as an assistant inspector general on the staff of Brig. Gen. James S. Negley.

In March 1864, Johnson was commissioned lieutenant colonel of the 11th Indiana Cavalry Regiment, and one month later, was promoted to colonel and given command of the 13th Indiana Cavalry Regiment. His regiment served in 1864 as part of the occupying force at Huntsville, Alabama. He mustered out with his regiment on September 25, 1865. On January 13, 1866, President Andrew Johnson nominated Gilbert Johnson for appointment to the grade of brevet brigadier general of volunteers, to rank from March 13, 1865, and the United States Senate confirmed the appointment on March 12, 1866.

After the war, Johnson returned to Huntsville, Alabama, and married the daughter of a prominent Huntsville citizen. He served as the town's postmaster from 1869 until his death in 1871 of complications from his war wounds. He was buried in Maple Hill Cemetery in Huntsville.

== See also ==
- List of American Civil War brevet generals (Union)
