= Louis J. Bruner =

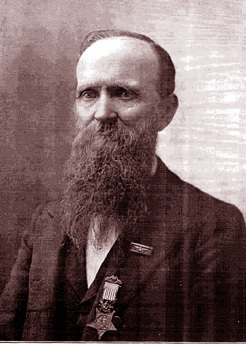
- Born: October 6, 1834; Monroe County, Indiana
- Died: January 28, 1912 (aged 77); Portland, Indiana
- Burial place: Green Park Cemetery, Portland, Indiana
- Military career
- Allegiance: United States of America
- Branch: United States Army; Union Army
- Rank: Private
- Unit: 5th Regiment Indiana Volunteer Cavalry - Company H
- Awards: Medal of Honor

Private Louis Jordan Bruner (October 6, 1834 – January 28, 1912) was an American soldier who fought in the American Civil War. Bruner received the country's highest award for bravery during combat, the Medal of Honor, for his action at Walkers Ford in Tennessee on December 2, 1863. He was honored with the award on March 9, 1896.

== Biography ==
Bruner was born in Monroe County, Indiana, on October 6, 1834, and enlisted in 5th Indiana Volunteer Cavalry at Clifty Brumer, Indiana. He died on January 28, 1912, and his remains are interred at the Green Park Cemetery in Indiana.

== Medal of Honor citation ==
Voluntarily passed through the enemy's lines under fire and conveyed to a battalion, then in a perilous position and liable to capture, information which enabled it to reach a point of safety.

== See also ==
- List of American Civil War Medal of Honor recipients: A–F
