= John Woolley (general) =

John Woolley (1824 – April 4, 1873) was a Union Army lieutenant colonel and provost marshal during the American Civil War. His name is sometimes spelled Wooley.

Woolley began his Union Army service as a first lieutenant in the 2nd Indiana Cavalry Regiment on October 3, 1861, and within a few days was transferred to the 5th Indiana Cavalry Regiment. He was promoted to major on March 27, 1862, and to lieutenant colonel on March 8, 1864.

On March 12, 1864, due to his previous association with General Lew Wallace, Woolley was made Wallace's provost marshal and was headquartered at Baltimore until he was mustered out of the volunteers on February 5, 1866.

On January 13, 1866, President Andrew Johnson nominated Woolley for appointment to the grade of brevet brigadier general of volunteers, to rank from March 13, 1865, and the United States Senate confirmed the appointment on March 12, 1866.

John Woolley died on April 4, 1873, at Milwaukee, Wisconsin. He was buried at Wood National Cemetery in Milwaukee.

== See also ==
- List of American Civil War brevet generals (Union)
