= Daniel Tweed Ferrier =

American Civil War soldier

- Born: November 26, 1841; Indiana, US
- Died: March 18, 1914 (aged 72); Indiana, US
- Burial place: Nebo Cemetery; Camden, Indiana, US
- Military career
- Allegiance: United States of America
- Branch: United States Army
- Rank: Sergeant
- Units: Company K, 2nd Indiana Volunteer Cavalry Regiment
- Awards: Medal of Honor

Daniel Tweed Ferrier (November 26, 1841 – March 18, 1914) was an American soldier who fought in the American Civil War. Ferrier received the United States' highest award for bravery during combat, the Medal of Honor, for his action at Varnells Station in Georgia on May 9, 1864. He was honored with the award on March 30, 1898.

== Biography ==
Ferrier was born in Indiana on November 26, 1841. He enlisted into the 2nd Indiana Cavalry. He died on March 18, 1914, and his remains are interred at Nebo Cemetery in Camden, Indiana.

== Medal of Honor citation ==
The President of the United States of America, in the name of Congress, takes pleasure in presenting the Medal of Honor to Sergeant Daniel Tweed Ferrier, United States Army, for extraordinary heroism on 9 May 1864, while serving with Company K, 2d Indiana Cavalry, in action at Varnells Station, Georgia. While his regiment was retreating, Sergeant Ferrier voluntarily gave up his horse to his brigade commander who had been unhorsed and was in danger of capture, thereby enabling him to rejoin and rally the disorganized troops. Sergeant Ferrier himself was captured and confined in Confederate prisons, from which he escaped and, after great hardship, rejoined the Union lines.

== See also ==
- List of American Civil War Medal of Honor recipients: A–F
