= Bridgeland (surname) =

Bridgeland is a surname. Notable people with the surname include:

- Eric Bridgeland, basketball coach
- John Bridgeland, United States activist working in White House and Congress
- John A. Bridgland (1826–1890), also known as John Alexander Bridgeland, American diplomat, businessman and soldier
- Samuel Bridgeland (1847–1903), Canadian physician and politician
- Tom Bridgeland (born 1973), British mathematician
