= Robert S. Granger =

Robert Seaman Granger
- Robert S. Granger
- Born: May 24, 1816; Zanesville, Ohio
- Died: April 25, 1894 (aged 77); Washington, D.C.
- Burial place: Woodlawn Cemetery, Zanesville, Ohio
- Military career
- Allegiance: United States of America; Union
- Branch: United States Army; Union Army
- Service years: 1838–1873
- Rank: Brigadier General; Brevet Major General
- Commands: 11th Infantry Regiment; 21st Infantry Regiment
- Conflicts: Mexican-American War; American Civil War

Robert Seaman Granger (May 24, 1816 – April 25, 1894) was a career officer in the United States Army, reaching the brevet rank of major general in the Union Army during the American Civil War.

== Life and military career ==
Granger was born in Zanesville, Ohio. He graduated from the United States Military Academy, placing 28th in the class of 1838. Granger became a first lieutenant of infantry in 1839. He served as an officer in the Seminole War, and was assistant instructor of tactics at West Point in 1843–44. During the Mexican–American War, Granger was promoted to captain on September 8, 1847. When the war ended, he was assigned to a series of posts on the Texas frontier.

With the outbreak of the Civil War and the secession of Texas in early 1861, he was captured with Major Sibley's command on April 27. He was paroled with the stipulation that he not serve in the field again until August 1862, when he was formally exchanged. During this period, he was promoted to major on September 9, 1861, and organized an infantry brigade at Mansfield, Ohio. He was the commandant of the troops at Louisville, Kentucky.

On September 1, 1862, following his exchange, he was commissioned brigadier general of Kentucky volunteers, and commanded the Kentucky state troops. He saw action in a series of small engagements—Shepherdsville, Lebanon Junction, and Lawrenceburg, for which he was brevetted as a colonel in the Regular Army. He received his commission as brigadier general of U. S. volunteers on October 20, 1862, and commanded a division. In 1863, he returned to administrative duty, commanding the Districts of Nashville and Middle Tennessee. In early 1864, he superintended the defenses and organized the depot at Nashville. He was then assigned to the command of the District of Northern Alabama, and was engaged in the capture of General Roddy's camp, in the expulsion of Joseph Wheeler from middle Tennessee, and in the defense against Nathan Bedford Forrest's raid. In October 1864, he defended Decatur, Alabama against John B. Hood's army, made a sortie on the Confederate siege-works, and received the brevet of brigadier general in the Regular Army for these services.

He commanded in northern Alabama in 1865 during the occupation. He was brevetted major general in the Regular Army for his services during the war and was promoted lieutenant colonel on June 12, 1865 and colonel on August 16, 1871. Granger was placed on the retired list January 1, 1873.

He died in Washington, D.C.

== See also ==
- List of American Civil War generals (Union)
