= John A. Bridgland =

American diplomat, businessman, soldier (1826–1890)

Col. John Alexander Bridgland
- Born: December 3, 1826; Lynchburg, Virginia, US
- Died: July 23, 1890 (aged 63); Fairland, Indiana, US
- Burial place: Earlham Cemetery, Richmond, Indiana, US
- Spouse: Caroline Gilbert (m. 1849–1880; her death)
- Children: 2
- Military career
- Branch: Union Army
- Service years: August 1861–March 1862
- Rank: Colonel
- Commands: 2nd Indiana Cavalry Regiment
- Known for: Politician, businessman, civil servant, military personnel, diplomat

Colonel John Alexander Bridgland (December 3, 1826 − July 29, 1890) was an American diplomat, businessman and soldier. He was a colonel in the Union Army during the American Civil War, and served as consul of the United States to the port city of Le Havre in France. Bridgland also was in the wholesale tobacco business, the street railway business, and the horse breeding and importing business in Indiana.

He also went by the names J.A. Bridgeland, and John Alexander Bridgeland.

== Beginnings ==
John Alexander Bridgland was born December 3, 1826, at Lynchburg, Virginia, to Alexander Bridgland, a wealthy landowner, planter and merchant, and Harriet Susannah Thornton. His grandfather was a prominent racehorse owner, Sterling C. Thornton, and his great-grandfather was William Thornton (Virginia burgess) himself a great-grandson of William Thornton (immigrant).

At the age of twelve his father died and like many planters had used his landholdings as collateral for future expectations, leaving the family bankrupt. As a result of his father's untimely death he was limited in the liberal education many of his relations was afforded. The family moved to Richmond, Indiana when he was young.

== Mexico and Indiana ==
Bridgland began his military career through business when the Thornton family instructed him to deliver horses from the United States to relations serving under General Winfield Scott in Veracruz, Mexico during the Mexican–American War. Bridgland was shipwrecked off the coast of Mexico but managed to meet up with the U.S. Army as Scott marched into Mexico City. He remained in Mexico with the army until they reached New Orleans, where he contracted Yellow Fever. Upon recovery he obtained passage by steamer to Cincinnati where he took employment in the wholesale of tobacco with the expectation of returning to Indiana.

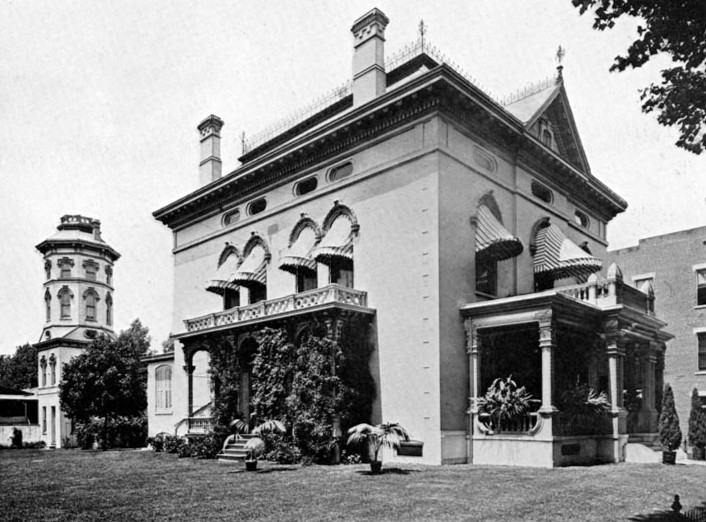
John A. Bridgland Mansion, built 1858, Richmond, Indiana

Finding great success in the mid-west he eventually set up a mercantile trade business in Richmond, Indiana. Bridgman had an interest in Indiana politics early in his life, he started as a Whig Party supporter, followed by membership in the American Party (or Know Nothing Party) and by 1860 becoming an active supporter of the Republican party and its presidential candidate, Abraham Lincoln.

== Civil War ==
Bridgeman was friends with Oliver P. Morton when he served as governor of Indiana (1861 to 1867), and Bridgeman allied himself with Morton after the outbreak of the American Civil War. He was referred to in the Richmond Dispatch newspaper as "One of Morton's Pets". Bridgland worked to organized and outfitted Union Army troops prior to his military enlistment in the war.

At the outbreak of the Civil War Bridgland received a commission of colonel of the 2nd Regiment Indiana Cavalry from Governor Morton. He was assigned to Camp Wickliffe near Athertonville, Kentucky under the command of General William "Bull" Nelson. His commission was in part for his experience during the Mexican-American War and as a preeminent breeder of fine horses. He fought for the Union in its western campaign at notable battles such as Shiloh and the occupation of Nashville. By March 1862, health issues caused Bridgland to leave his regiment early, and he was succeeded by Edward Cook.

== Post-war life and diplomacy ==
Bridgland's business was heavily affected by post-war inflation and he worked actively to rebuild his wealth. He was able to do so and again took active interest in politics and veterans affairs. He regularly traveled to New York and Washington and became well acquainted with other politicians and military figures particularly with General William Tecumseh Sherman.

Citizens' Company (or the Citizens' Street Railway Company), an Indianapolis street railway enterprise was incorporated in 1864 with Bridgland as president, and R. B. Catherwood as the organizer.

In 1869, Bridgeman was appointed a supervisor at the Internal Revenue in Austin, Texas, serving under chief clerk William O. Avery. He resigned from the role in March 1871, and was replaced by Kennett R. Cobb. In 1876, Bridgland was investigated by the Committee on Expenditures in the United States State Department, with charges on his official conduct.

In 1873, President Ulysses S. Grant appointed him U.S. Consul at Le Havre in France. He served as Consul until 1882.

== Horse breeding and training ==
Bridgland was an avid horseman his entire life, a passion adopted from his grandfather Sterling Thornton. During his period as consul he advocated for American horse industry to broker a deal to sell American horses to the French Army. In addition to selling horses in Europe, Bridgland two stallions, three colts and two fillies from some of the best stables in England.

In the 1880s, Bridgeman was president of Oakwood Stock Farm, a horse importing and breeding business in Indianapolis, and Thomas G. Barry was the secretary.

== Family ==
Bridgland married Caroline Elizabeth Gilbert (1826–1880) on June 14, 1849, at Richmond, Indiana. She was originally from Pennsylvania. He never remarried after her death in 1880, but in his retirement had a live-in companion named Mary Hannegan.

Bridgland had one child, Harriet Augusta Bridgland born in 1853. Harriet Bridgland married Carlos Rodríguez de Trujillo y Malibrán in Seville, Spain with whom she had two children, John Alexander Rodríguez de Trujillo and Caroline Rodríguez de Trujillo. She and her family resided in London, England, and Seville, Spain. Bridgland's descendants are not known to have ever returned to the United States.

== Death and burial ==
He died on July 23, 1890, in Fairland, Indiana, and is buried at Earlham Cemetery in Richmond, Indiana.
