= Battle of Decatur =

1864 battle of the American Civil War

- Part of the American Civil War
Date	October 26–29, 1864
Location	Decatur, Alabama 34.614°N 86.986°W
Result	Union victory

Belligerents
United States (Union)	Confederate States

Commanders and leaders
(United States) Robert S. Granger	(Confederate States of America) John B. Hood

Strength
3,000–5,000 (Note: Sword cites 3,000; Kennedy cites 5,000.)	39,000

Casualties and losses
155	450
- Location within Alabama

The Battle of Decatur was a demonstration conducted from October 26 to October 29, 1864, as part of the Franklin-Nashville Campaign of the American Civil War. Union forces of 3–5,000 men under Brigadier-General Robert S. Granger prevented the 39,000 men of the Confederate Army of Tennessee under General John B. Hood from crossing the Tennessee River at Decatur, Alabama.

== Background ==
General John B. Hood was marching through northern Alabama on his way to an invasion of Union-held Tennessee. His army had departed northwest from the vicinity of Atlanta, Georgia, in late September 1864, hoping their destruction of Union supply lines would lure Major-General William T. Sherman's Union army into battle. Sherman pursued Hood as far as Gaylesville, Alabama, but decided to return his army to Atlanta and instead conduct a March to the Sea through Georgia. He gave responsibility for the defense of Tennessee to Thomas at Nashville.

Hood departed from Gadsden, Alabama, on October 22, en route to Guntersville, Alabama, where he planned to cross the Tennessee River. However, he later learned from cavalry Brigadier-General Phillip Roddey that crossing place was strongly guarded, while Decatur, forty miles west, was said to be "lightly guarded". Concerned over the possibility of Federal gunboats destroying any pontoon bridge he might deploy, along with the absence of Forrest's horsemen to bring him intelligence, Hood changed his course to Decatur.

== Battle ==
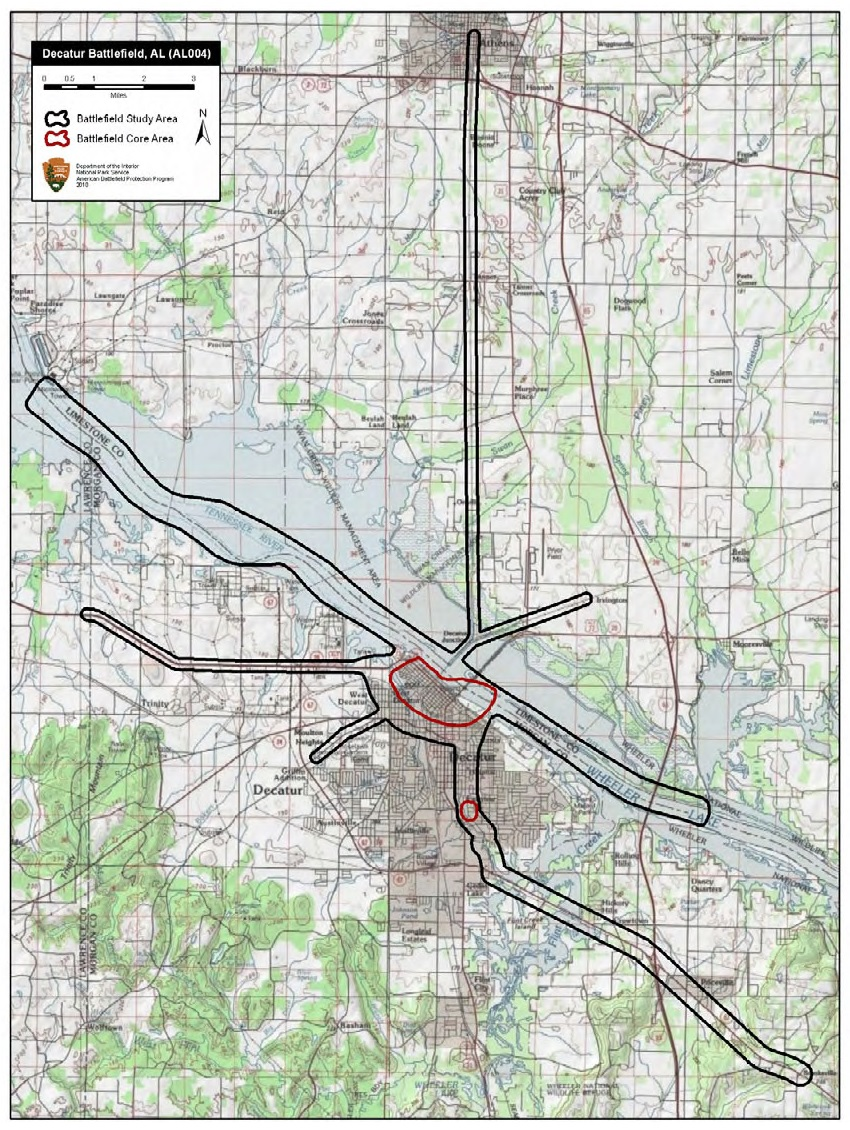
Map of Decatur Battlefield core and study areas by the American Battlefield Protection Program.

When Hood arrived at Decatur on October 26, he found a Federal infantry force of 3,000 to 5,000 men defending an entrenched line that included two forts and 1,600 yards of rifle pits; a much heavier force than Roddey had believed. Two Federal gunboats patrolled the river. General George Thomas, in Nashville, sent supplies and reinforcements to Decatur along with orders to "defend Decatur to the last extremity." On October 27, Hood arranged his army as it arrived to encircle Decatur. Meanwhile, the Union continued to pour reinforcements into Decatur which arrived just in time to fill gaps in the wavering Union lines. The next morning, he sent Confederate skirmishers through a dense fog to a ravine within 800 yards of the main fortifications. At about noon, a Federal regiment drove the skirmishers out of the ravine, capturing 125 men. "With the soldiers hungry and supplies scarce", Hood knew he could not afford the casualties from a full-scale assault and decided to cross the Tennessee River elsewhere. He marched further the west and crossed near Tuscumbia, Alabama, where Muscle Shoals prevented interference by the Federal gunboats.
