= 2nd Indiana Cavalry Regiment =

2nd Indiana Cavalry Regiment 41st Indiana Infantry Regiment
- Flag of the United States, 1863–1865
- Active: September 20, 1861, to July, 1865
- Country: United States
- Allegiance: Union
- Branch: Cavalry
- Engagements: American Civil War: Battle of Shiloh; Siege of Corinth; Battle of Perryville; Battle of Stones River; Tullahoma Campaign; Chickamauga Campaign; Battle of Chickamauga; Battle of Resaca; Battle of Kennesaw Mountain; Atlanta campaign; Wilson's Raid; Battle of Selma

Commanders
- Notable commanders: John A. Bridgland; Edward M. McCook

The 2nd Indiana Cavalry Regiment, later designated the 41st Indiana Infantry Regiment, was the first complete cavalry regiment raised in the U.S. state of Indiana to fight in the American Civil War.

== Service ==
The regiment was organized in Indianapolis on September 20, 1861. The regiment left Indiana for Louisville, Kentucky on December 15, 1861. Action at Bowling Green, Ky., February 1, 1862 (Co. "H"). Movement to Nashville, Tenn., February 14–25. Occupation of Nashville February 25. March to Pittsburg Landing, Tenn., March 10-April 8. Reconnaissance in force April 22. Advance on and siege of Corinth, Miss., April 29-May 30. Tuscumbia Creek May 31-June 1. Pursuit to Booneville June 1–3. Osbora and Wolf's Creeks June 4. Buell's Campaign in North Alabama and Middle Tennessee June to August. Raid on Louisville & Nashville R. R. August 19–21 (Detachment). Humboldt Road, near Gallatin, August 21. Murfreesboro, Tenn., August 20-25-27 and September 7. Crab Orchard, Ky., September 10. Vinegar Hill September 22. Near Nashville October 1. Near Perryville, Ky., October 6–7. Chaplin Hills, Perryville, October 8. Near Mountain Gap, Ky., October 14–16. Big Rockcastle River, near Mt. Vernon, October 16. New Haven October 29. Capture of 3rd Georgia Cavalry. Hartsville, Tenn., November 28 and December 7. Regiment complimented in special field orders for recapture of Government train and 200 prisoners. Advance on Murfreesboro December 26–30 (Co. "M"). Lavergne December 26–27 (Co. "M"). Operations near Lavergne December 29–31 (Co. "M"). Battle of Stone's River December 30–31, 1862, and January 1–3, 1863 (Co. "M"). Duty near Nashville, Tenn., till June, 1863. Murfreesboro March 10. Shelbyville Pike, near Murfreesboro, June 6. Triune June 9 and 11. Middle Tennessee (or Tullahoma) Campaign June 23-July 7. Middleton June 24. Guy's Gap, Fosterville and Shelbyville June 27. Bethpage Bridge, Elk River, July 1. Occupation of Middle Tennessee till August 16. Expedition to Huntsville July 13–22. Passage of Cumberland Mountains and Tennessee River and Chickamauga (Ga.) Campaign August 16-September 22. Reconnaissance toward Rome September 11. Alpine September 12. Dirt Town, LaFayette Road, near Chattanooga River, September 12. Reconnaissance from Lee and Gordon's Mills toward LaFayette and skirmish September 13. Near Stevens' Gap September 18. Battle of Chickamauga, Ga., September 19–21. Missionary Ridge and Shallow Ford Gap September 22. Operations against Wheeler and Roddy September 30-October 17. Fayetteville October 13–14. Duty along Nashville & Chattanooga R. R. till December. Operations about Dandridge and Mossy Creek December 24–28. Peck's House, near New Market, December 24. Mossy Creek December 26. Talbot Station December 28. Mossy Creek, Talbot Station, December 29. Regiment re-enlisted January 10, 1864. Near Mossy Creek January 11–12. Operations about Dandridge January 16–17. Bend of Chucky Road, near Dandridge, January 16. Dandridge January 17. Operations about Dandridge January 26–28. Fair Garden January 27. Swann's Island January 28. Near Marysvllle February 8. Atlanta (Ga.) Campaign May 1 to September 8. Varnell's Station May 7 and 9. Demonstrations on Dalton May 9–13. Tilton May 13. Battle of Resaca May 14–15. Cassville May 19. Stilesborough May 23. Burnt Hickory May 24. Battles about Dallas May 25-June 5. Ackworth June 3–4. Big Shanty June 6. Operations about Marietta and against Kenesaw Mountain June 10-July 2. Lost Mountain June 15–17. Assault on Kenesaw June 27. Nickajack Creek July 2–5. Chattahoochie River July 5–17. Siege of Atlanta July 22-August 25. McCook's Raid on Atlanta & West Point R. R. July 27–31. Lovejoy Station July 29–30. Clear Creek July 30. Newnan July 30. Expedition to Jasper August 11–15. Flank movement on Jonesboro August 25–30. Rousseau's pursuit of Wheeler September 1–8. Consolidated to a Battalion of 4 Companies September 14. Cartersville September 20. Camp Creek September 30. Operations against Hood in North Georgia and North Alabama October. Moved to Louisville, Ky., to refit. Pursuit of Lyon from Paris, Ky., to Hopkinsville, Ky., December 6, 1864, to January 15, 1865. Hopkinsville, Ky., December 16, 1864. Moved to Nashville, Tenn., duty there till February, 1865, and at Waterloo, Ala., till March. Wilson's Raid from Chickasaw, Ala., to Macon, Ga., March 22-April 24. Near Scottsvllle and Selma April 2. Near Hinton April 10. Montgomery April 12. Columbus Road, near Tuskegee, April 14. West Point and near Opellka April 16. Capture of Macon April 20. Duty at Macon and in the Dept. of Georgia till June. Moved to Nashville, Tean., and there mustered out July 12, 1865.

== Casualties ==
According to Frederick H. Dyer (see references) the 2nd Indiana's total service fatalities were 4 officers and 38 enlistees killed and mortally wounded, and 3 officers and 211 enlistees dead of disease. The regiment lost a total of 256 men.

== Commanders ==
- John A. Bridgland: September 3, 1861 - March 22, 1862 (resigned from command).
- Robert Noble Hudson: (declined command).
- Edward M. McCook: April 30, 1862 - March 1, 1864 (promoted to Brigadier General).
- James W. Stewart: March 1, 1864 - July, 1865 (mustered out with regiment).

== Notable people ==
- John A. Bridgland: Brigland served as the original Colonel of the regiment from September 1861 - March 1862 and resigned due to illness. Following the war Brigland was a politician, businessman, and civil servant.
- Edward M. McCook: McCook was a lawyer, politician, diplomat, and the governor of the territory of Colorado after the war. McCook was a member of the famous "Fighting McCook" family of Ohio.
- Joel Elliott: Served as a Private with Company C before being commissioned as a 2nd Lieutenant in the 7th Indiana Cavalry Regiment. Elliott survived the war but was later killed at the Battle of the Washita River in 1868.
- Joseph Mitchell: Mitchell served as a 2nd Lieutenant and later the Captain of Company M. Mitchell would later go on to become a politician and judge in Indiana, eventually serving as the Justice of the Indiana Supreme Court from 1885 to 1890.
- Gilbert M. L. Johnson: Originally served as a Lieutenant in the 2nd Indiana Cavalry. Johnson would end up retiring from the Army as a Brevet Brigadier General.
- John Woolley: Woolley was a Union Army lieutenant colonel and provost marshal during the American Civil War. Woolley had originally served as a Lieutenant
- Daniel Tweed Ferrier: Received the Medal of Honor for his actions at the Battle of Varnells Station in Georgia. Ferrier served in Company K of the 2nd Indiana Cavalry Regiment.

== See also ==
- List of Indiana Civil War regiments
- Indiana in the Civil War
