= Sexual orientation, gender identity, and military service =

Sexual orientation, gender identity, and military service may refer to:

- Sexual orientation and gender identity in military service
- Sexual orientation and gender identity in the Australian military
- Sexual orientation and gender identity in the United States military
- Sexual orientation and gender identity in the Israeli military

== See also ==
- Sexual orientation and military service
- Transgender people and military service
- Intersex people and military service
