= Sexual orientation and gender identity in the United States military =

LGBT in the US military

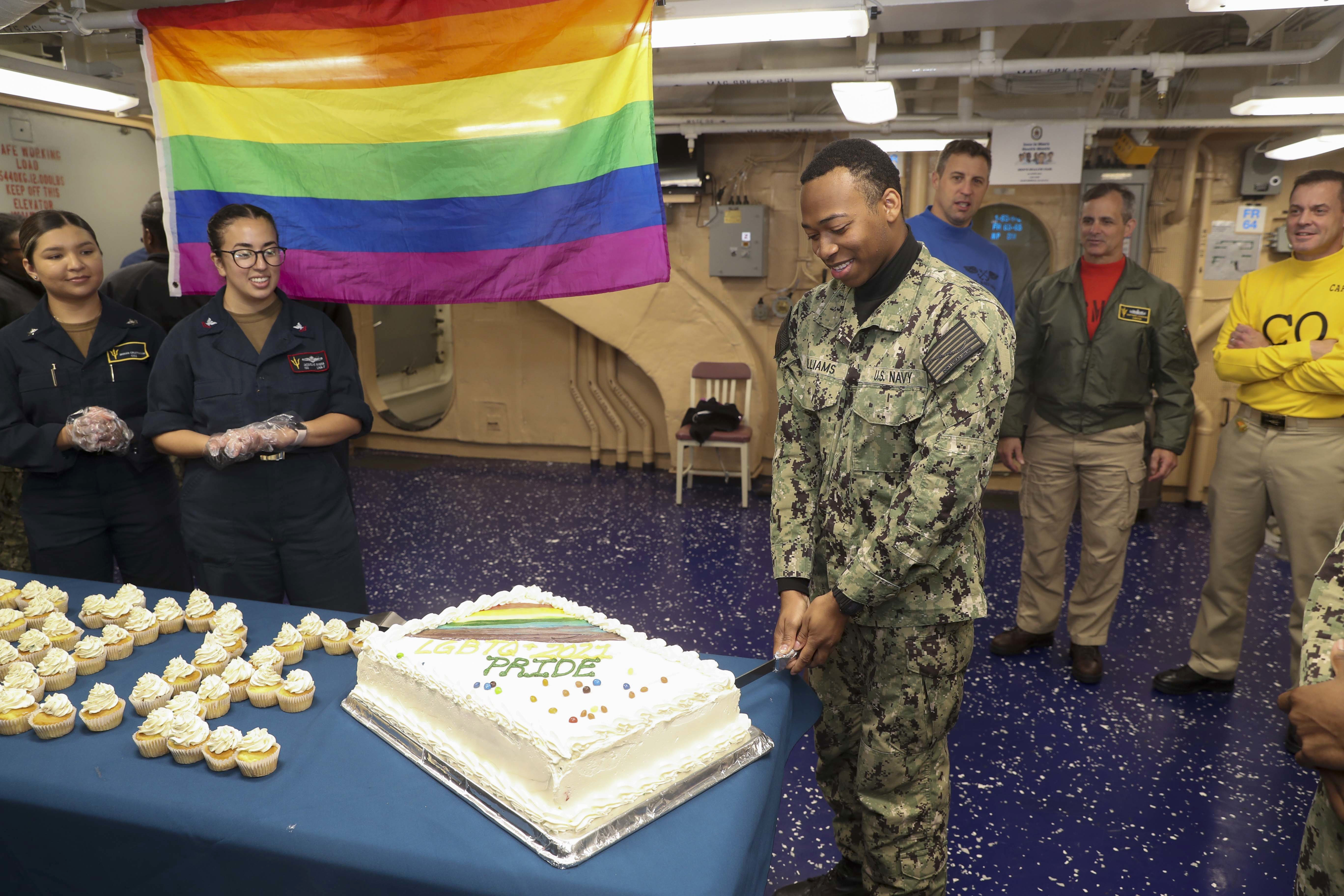
U.S. Sailors gather for cake during a Lesbian, Gay, Bisexual and Transgender Pride Month observance aboard the amphibious assault ship USS Tripoli (LHA-7) June 22, 2021, in the Pacific Ocean.

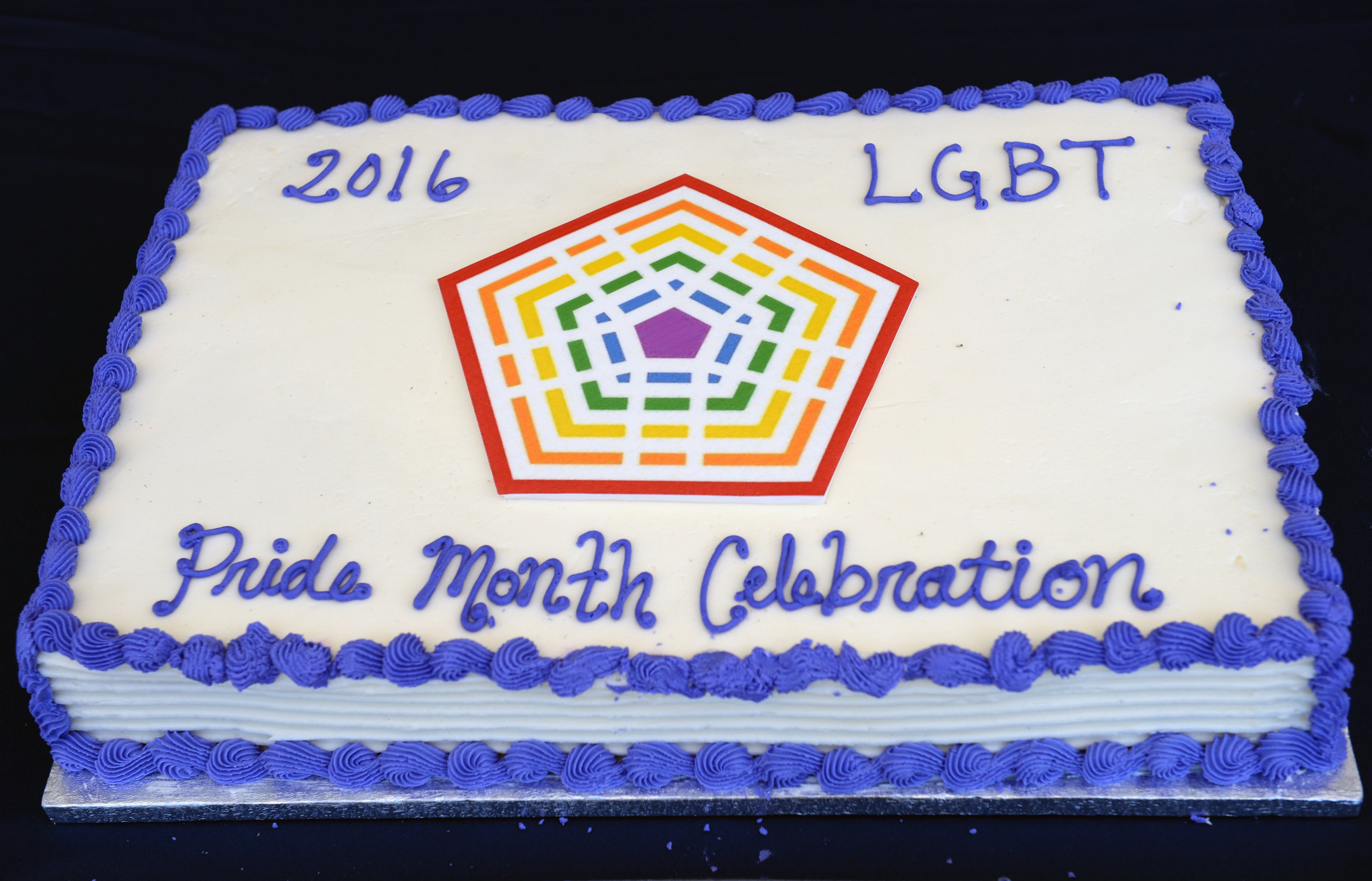
The Department of Defense LGBT Pride Month event celebration cake. The celebration was held on the Pentagon Courtyard, June 8, 2016.

In the past most lesbian, gay, bisexual, transgender, and queer (LGBTQ) personnel had major restrictions placed on them in terms of service in the United States military. As of 2010 sexual orientation and gender identity in the United States military varies greatly as the United States Armed Forces have become increasingly openly diverse in the regards of LGBTQ (Note: For the existence and experiences of transgender people in the US military, see Transgender personnel in the United States military) people and acceptance towards them.

In 2025, US President Donald Trump signed an executive order that bans transgender individuals within the US Military. In May 2025, the policy went into effect banning transgender individuals from the military, after a 6–3 decision from the Supreme Court of the United States.

According to a 2015 report from the RAND Corporation, a survey of over 16,000 service members found that 6.1% of the respondents identified as being LGBT, with 4.2% of males and 16.6% of females making up this statistic. When sexual orientation and gender identity are separated, 5.8% were lesbian, gay or bisexual, and 0.6% were transgender (0.3% of transgender respondents also identified as lesbian, gay or bisexual).

In June 2024, US President Joe Biden signed a "pardon proclamation", that formally pardoned thousands of military veterans with historical gay sex criminal records.

== By demographics ==
=== Non-heterosexuals ===
Until 1993, military policy strictly forbid non-heterosexuals from serving in the military. From 1993, the military used its "Don't ask, don't tell" policy, which only restricted non-heterosexuals from serving if they were open about their sexual orientation. This led to a number of active investigations into members of the services to determine their sexuality and saw several court challenges over privacy rights. The "Don't ask, don't tell" policy was repealed in September 2011, allowing homosexuals and bisexuals to serve openly in the armed forces. Marriage and partner benefits remained in question until after the Supreme Court ruled in United States v. Windsor (2013) that the military must offer similar benefits to these relationships as they do to heterosexual ones. Since 2013, the military gives fully equal treatment legally to their partners and families.

=== Transgender people ===
From the creation of the United States military to 1960, there was no ban on transgender people from serving or enlisting the United States military. From 1960 to June 30, 2016, there was a blanket ban on all transgender people from serving and enlisting in the United States military; this ended on January 1, 2018, when transgender individuals in the United States military were allowed to serve in their identified or assigned gender upon completing transition.

From January 1, 2018, to April 11, 2019, transgender individuals could enlist in the United States military under the condition of being stable for 18 months in their identified or assigned gender. Under the 2020 version of DoD Instruction, 1300.28, transgender personnel in the United States military could only serve in their original sex assignment, unless they had been grandfathered in prior to April 12, 2019, or were given a waiver. This Memorandum, originally scheduled to expire on March 12, 2020, was extended until September 12, 2020. Before the Memorandum expired, it was replaced by a reissued version of DoD Instruction 1300.28, entitled "Military Service by Transgender Persons and Persons with Gender Dysphoria", which took effect on September 4, 2020.

On January 25, 2021, U.S. President Joe Biden issued an executive order to revoke the bans on transgender individuals. Despite not requiring the U.S. Department of Homeland Security and U.S. Department of Defense to immediately issue orders completely lifting the transgender bans, such orders were required after both the U.S. Secretary of Defense and the U.S. Secretary of Homeland Security held consultation with the Joint Chiefs of Staff.

=== Intersex persons ===
The accepting of intersex people in the United States Armed Forces seems to vary depending on the nature of the condition for individual people. Publications by the United States National Center for Biotechnology Information recommends that intersex individuals be allowed to serve in the armed forces, but not combat units. The Veterans Health Administration distinguishes between surgeries for transgender individuals and intersex persons. In 2015 this allowed intersex persons to receive medically necessary treatment that was prohibited for trans people at the time. The Civil Air Patrol and Coast Guard Auxiliary accept all intersex persons.

=== Cross-dressers ===
In 2012 transvestism was included in a list of conditions which disqualified individuals for service under the Department of Defense Instruction 6130.03. The ban dates back to 1961. The repeal of Don't ask, don't tell did not allow cross-dressers to serve openly in the armed forces. Since cross-dressing is sometimes conflated with attempts by transgender people to transition, there have been instances of people being discharged for cross-dressing or rejected from service altogether when trying to enlist due to past cross-dressing. As of 2021, transvestism is still grounds for discharge, or denial of service in the US Military.

== By service ==
=== Air Force ===
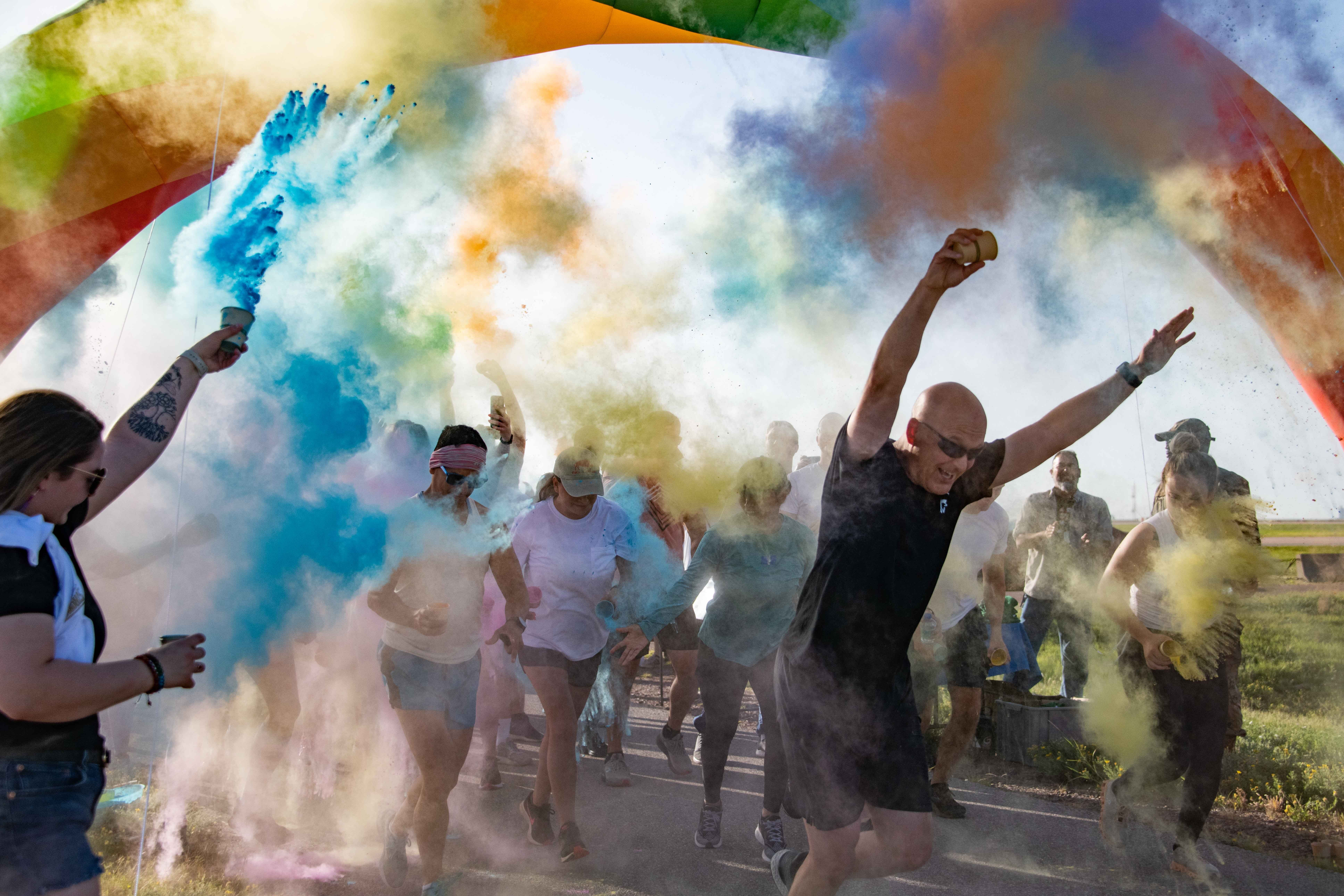
U.S. Air Force airmen run through the starting line of the Pride Month color run at Altus Air Force Base, Oklahoma, June 2022.

In 2013 it was revealed that Mike Rosebush, who then oversaw the "Character and Leadership" coaching program of the Air Force Academy, had previously worked as an ex-gay therapist, and as the vice president of the ex-gay-therapy-supporting Focus on the Family Institute.

=== Army ===
In 2016 Eric Fanning became the 22nd Secretary of the Army, making him the first openly gay head of any service in the U.S. military.

=== Coast Guard ===
In 1994, the United States Coast Guard issued a memo by Commandant Thomas Fisher public which barred anti-gay discrimination against the service's civilian employees while uniformed personnel were still subject to discharge under "don't ask, don't tell".

=== Marine Corps ===
In 2013 the U.S. Marines announced that clubs conducting business on base must admit same-sex spouses.

=== Navy ===
The Newport sex scandal arose from a 1919 investigation by the United States Navy into homosexual acts by Navy personnel and civilians in Newport, Rhode Island. The investigation was noted for its controversial methods of intelligence gathering, specifically its use of enlisted personnel to investigate alleged homosexuals by engaging them sexually. A subsequent military trial ended with the court-martial of 17 sailors charged with sodomy and "scandalous conduct." Most were sent to the naval prison at the Portsmouth Naval Shipyard in Maine. Two more were dishonorably discharged and two others were found innocent with no further action. There was national news coverage of the scandal and a congressional investigation, which concluded with Secretary of the Navy Josephus Daniels and Assistant Secretary of the Navy (and future United States president) Franklin D. Roosevelt being formally rebuked by a Congressional committee.

The USNS Harvey Milk was officially named at a ceremony in San Francisco on 16 August 2016. It is the first U.S. Navy ship named for an openly gay leader (Harvey Milk, who served as a diving officer in the Navy from 1951 to 1955.)

In 2023, the Military Religious Freedom Foundation shared a video of Secretary of the Navy Carlos Del Toro making homophobic comments during a townhall meeting. When asked about combating homophobia in the Navy, Del Toro promoted homosexuality as being a "choice". A Navy official later responded that Del Toro meant to say that a person making the decision to reveal their sexuality by coming out is a choice.

== Healthcare ==
=== HIV military policy ===
In August 2024, a federal Virginia judge immediately ordered that HIV-positive individuals "with an undetectable viral load" and also who are "fit and healthy" must be allowed, permitted and included within the US Military - regardless of being retained or wanting to join. Official policy for many decades by the Pentagon within Washington D.C. HIV-positive individuals are explicitly banned from the US Military outright.

== Memorials for Queer veterans ==
In 2000, a memorial to all veterans and to Queer veterans was dedicated in the national veterans cemetery in Phoenix, Arizona. In 2001, the first American memorial specifically honoring LGBT veterans was dedicated in Desert Memorial Park, Cathedral City, California. In 2014, the third LGBT Veterans Memorial was dedicated at the New Mexico Veterans Memorial Park in Albuquerque, New Mexico by the Bataan chapter of the American Veterans for Equal Rights. In May 2015, the first American federally-approved monument honoring LGBT veterans with the message "Gay, lesbian, bisexual and transgender people have served honorably and admirably in America's armed forces" was dedicated at the Abraham Lincoln National Cemetery near Chicago; the US$18,000 monument was dedicated by the Chicago Chapter of American Veterans for Equal Rights, and was defaced by vandals in June 2017.

== Gallery ==
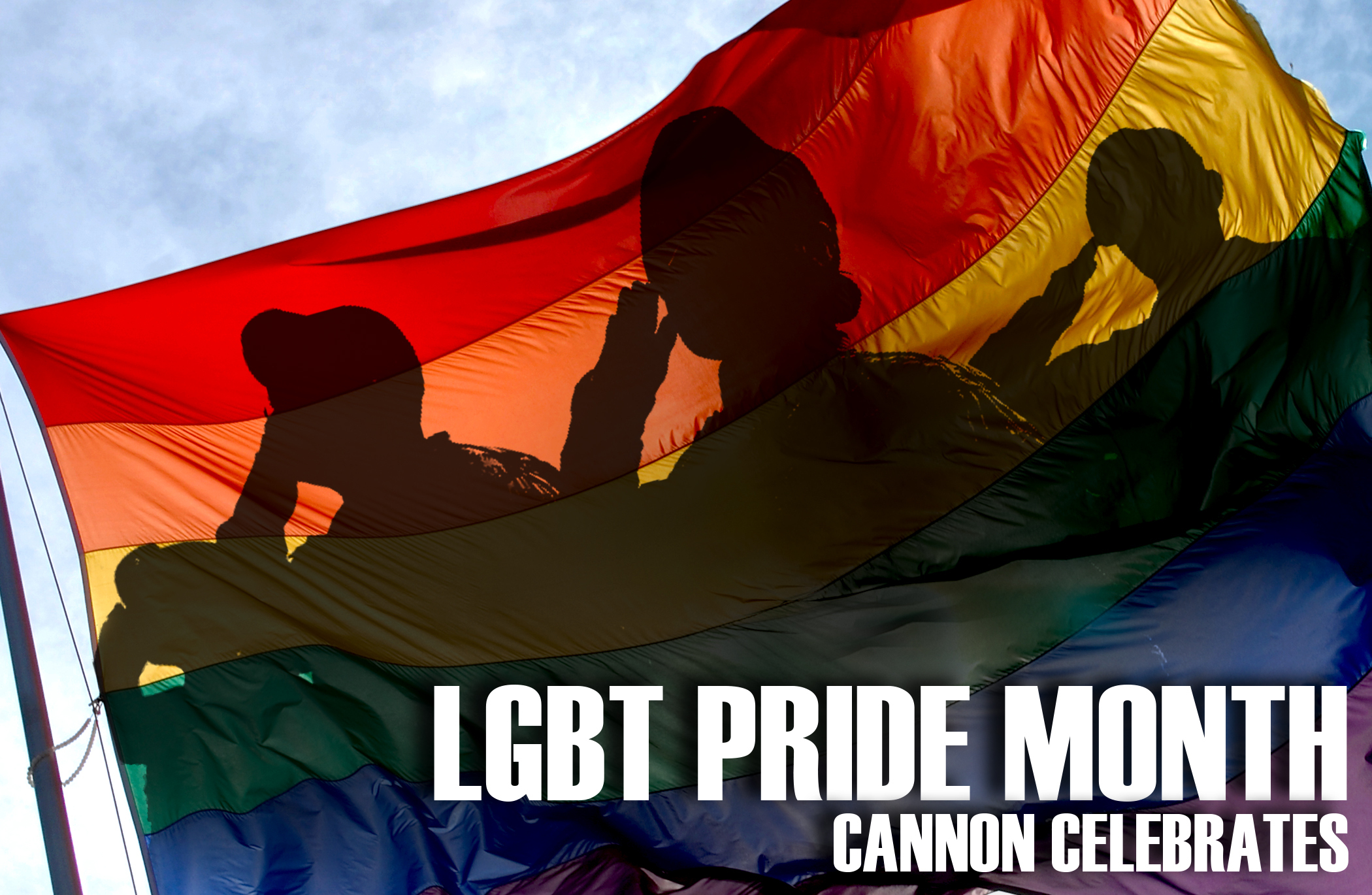

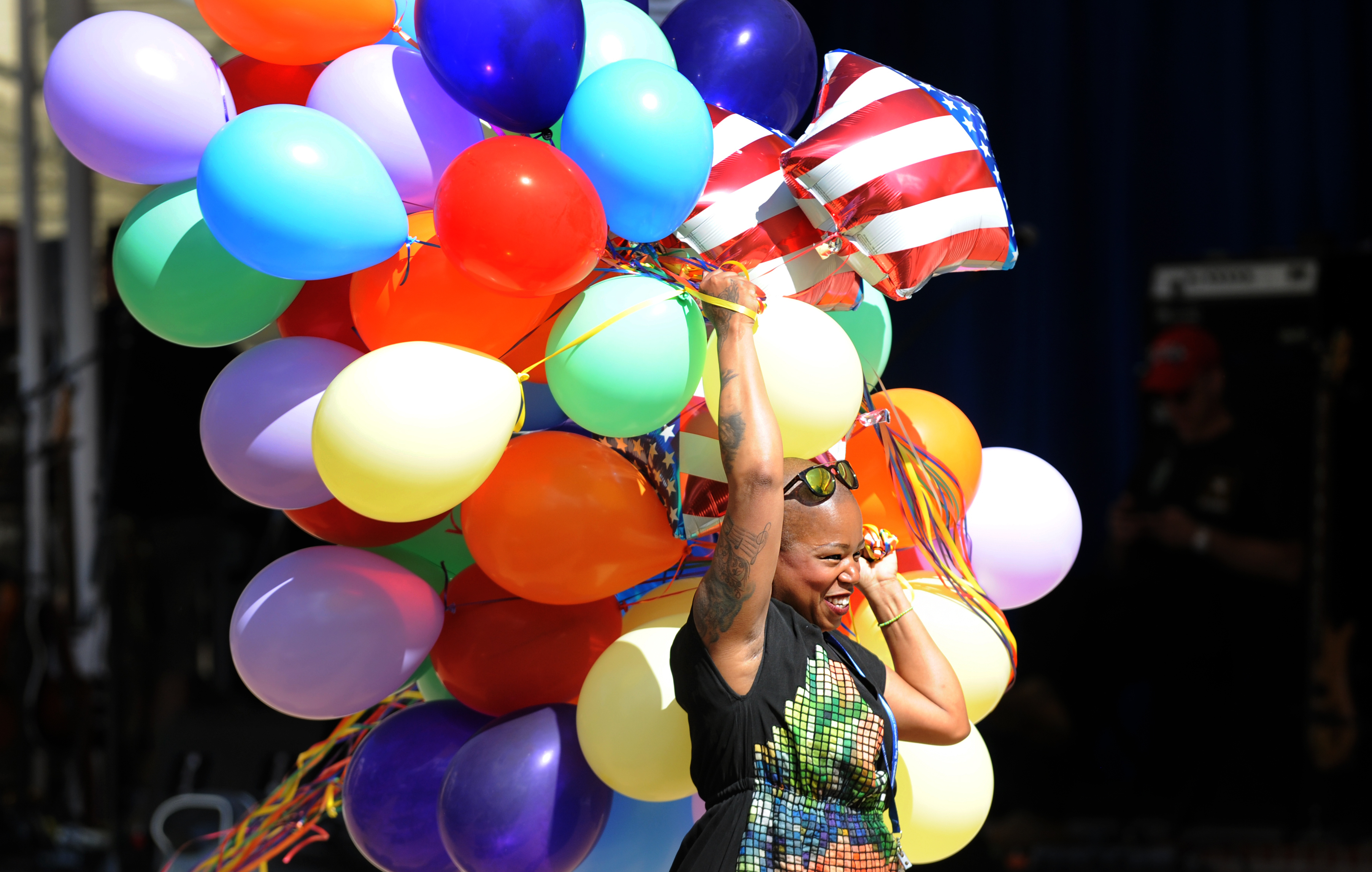

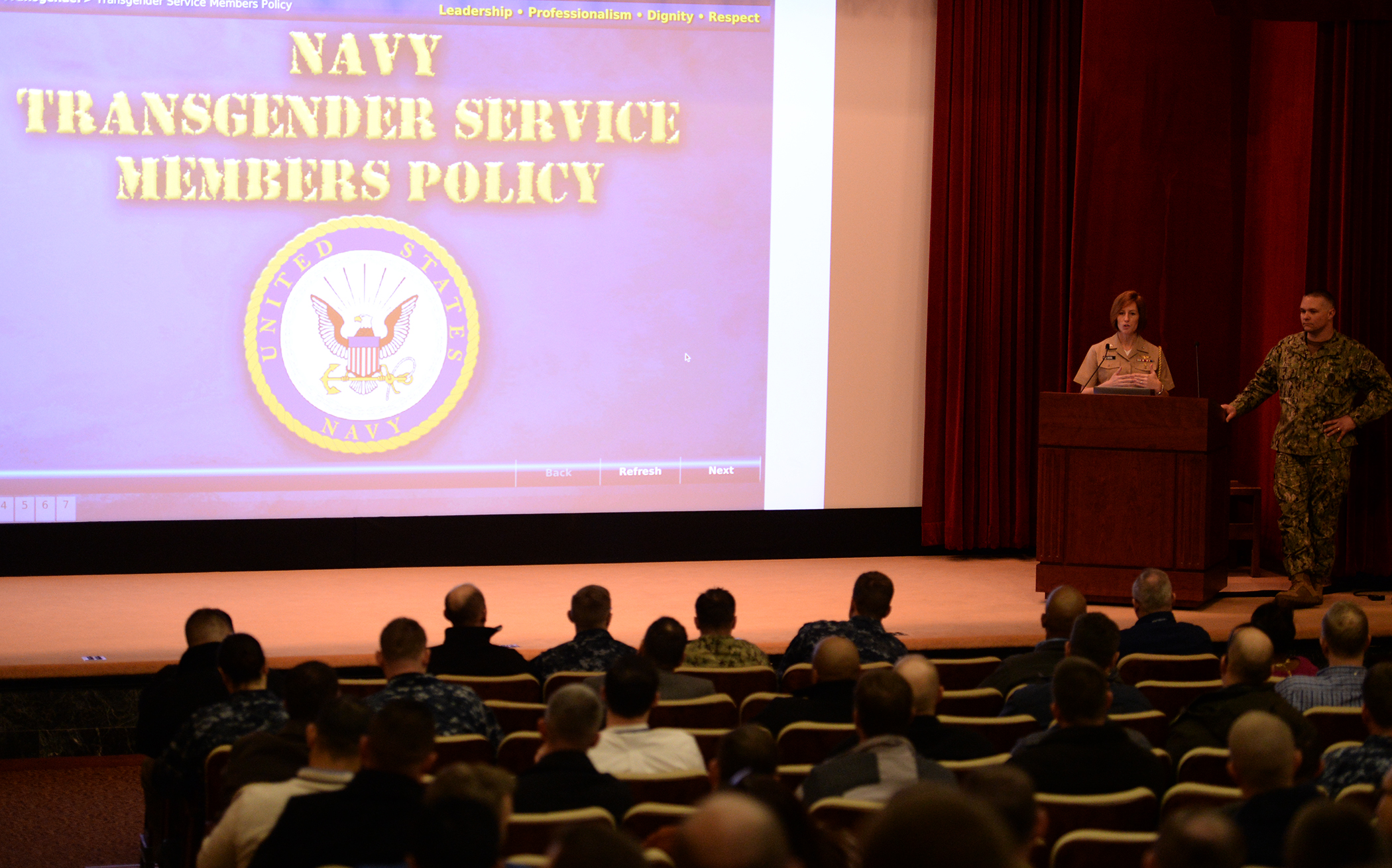

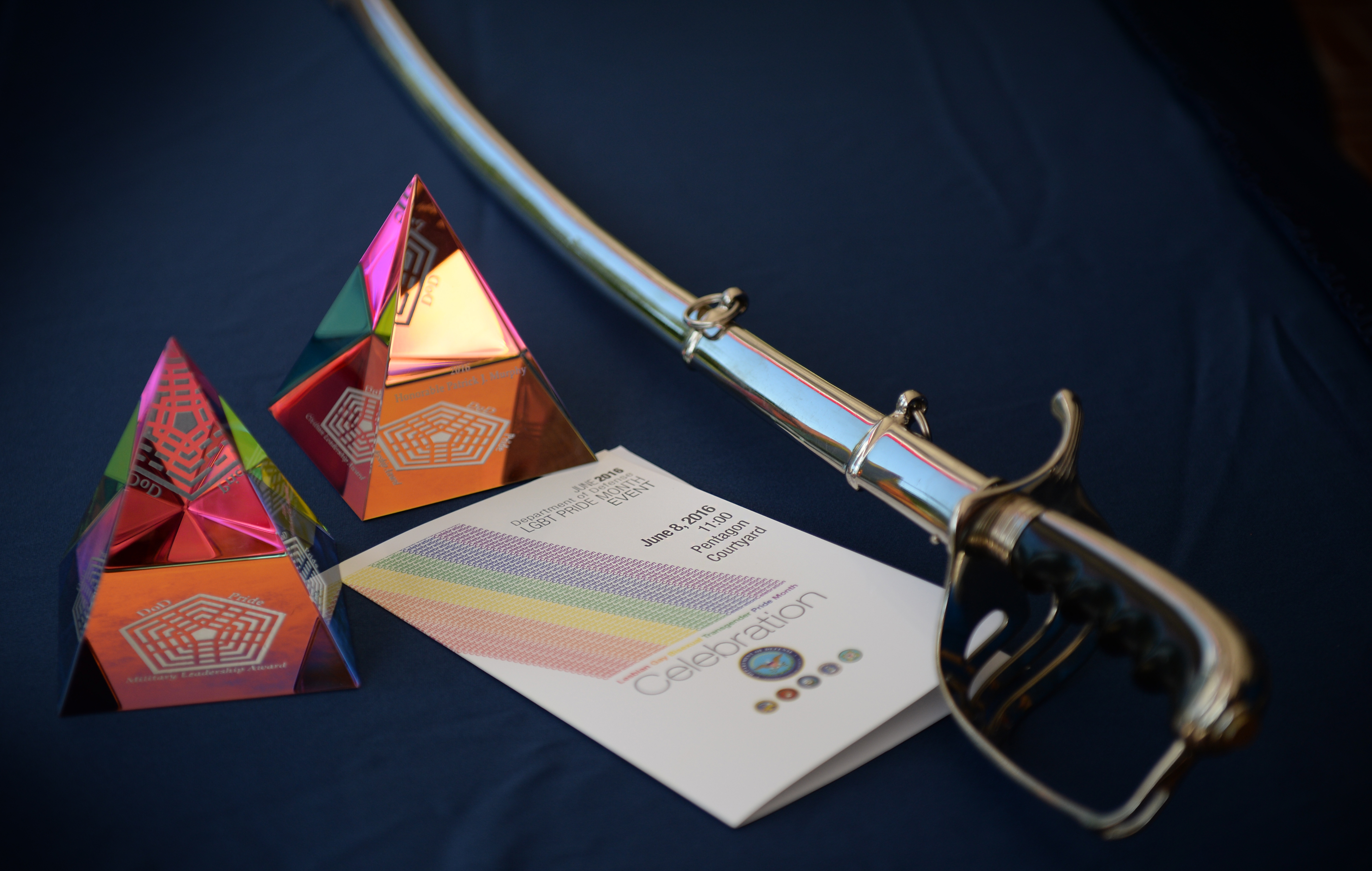

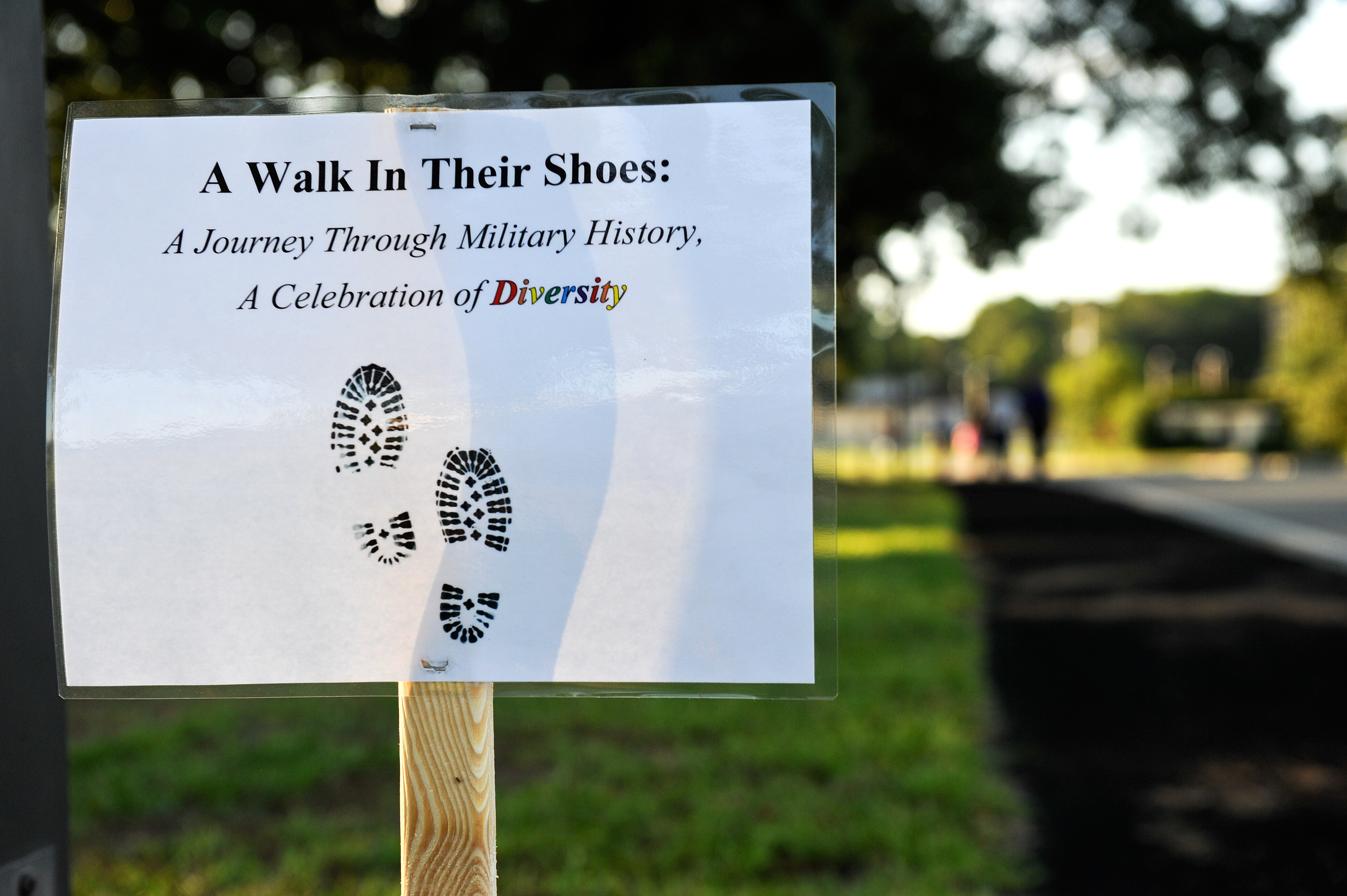

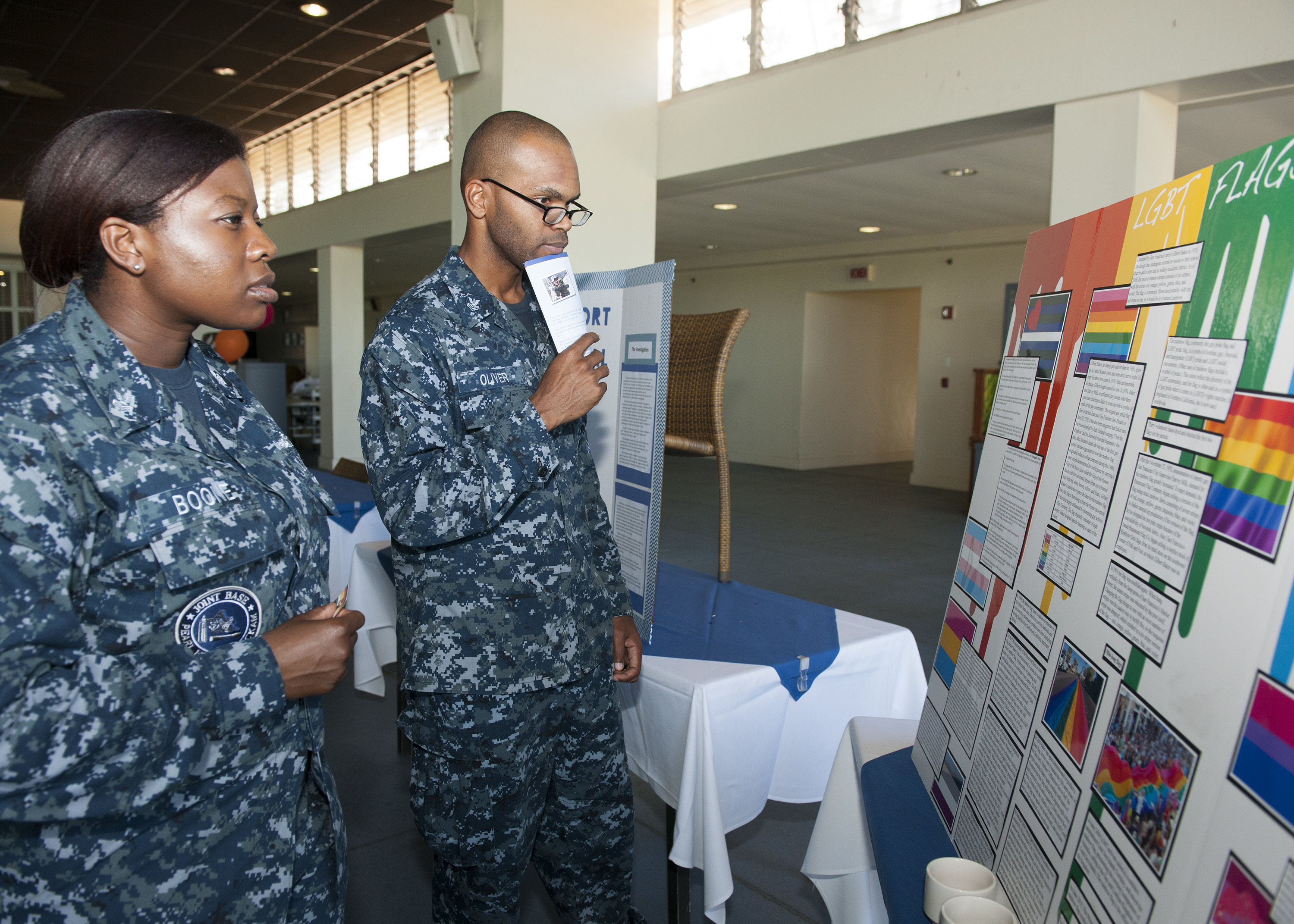

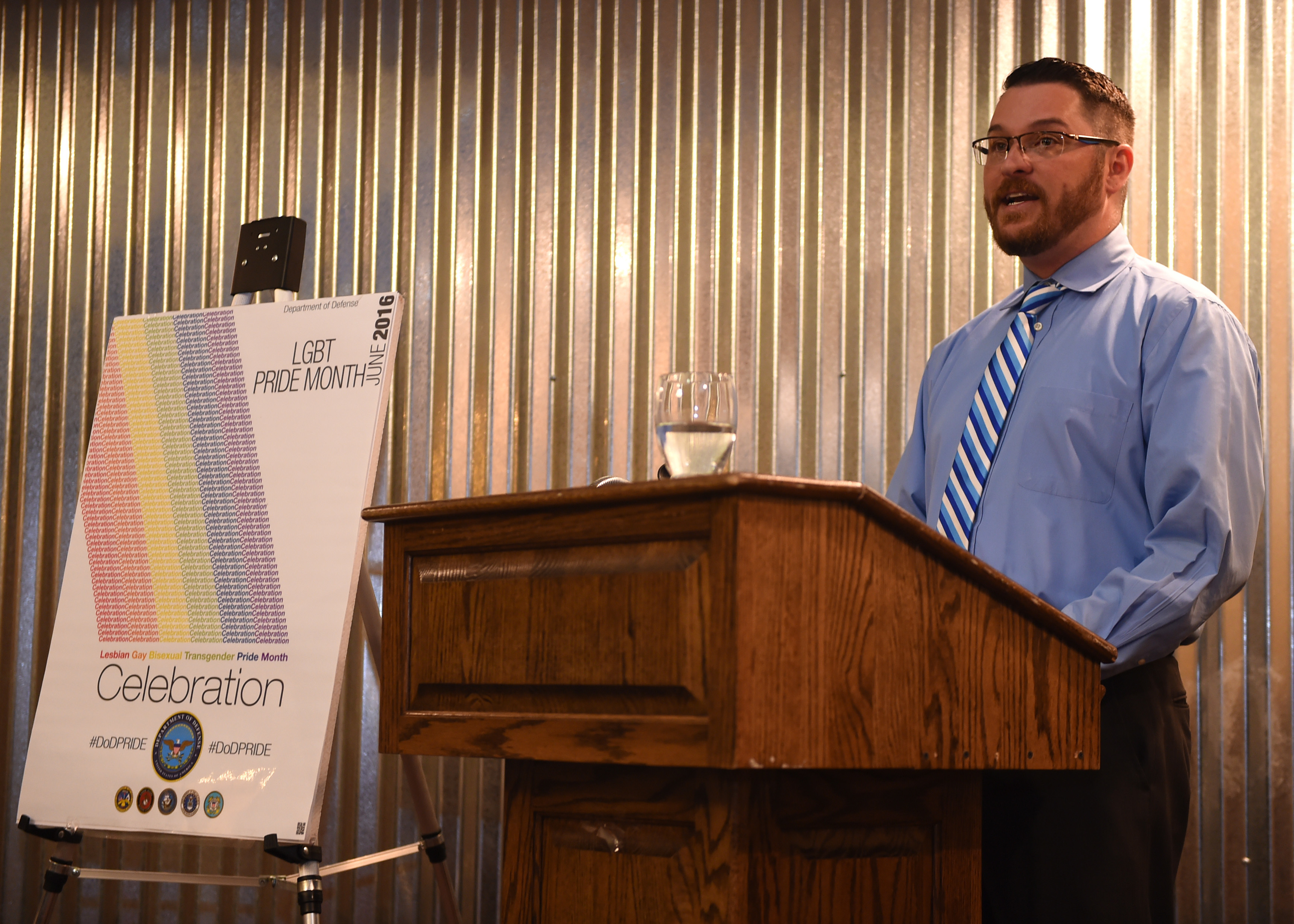

== See also ==
- Bibliography of works on the United States military and LGBT+ topics
- Sexual orientation and gender identity in the Israeli military
- Sexual orientation and gender identity in the Australian military
- Intersex people and military service
- Military sexual assault#Gender and sexual minorities
- Women in the United States Armed Forces
- Racial segregation in the United States Armed Forces
- Conscription in the United States
