= Mary Petty (disambiguation) =

Mary Petty may refer to:

- Mary Petty (1899–1976), American illustrator
- Mary L. Petty (1916–2001), American army nurse during World War II
- Mary Lou Petty (1915–2014), American competition swimmer
