= CenterPoint Properties =

Company that invests primarily in real estate used for intermodal freight transport

- Industry: Real estate
- Predecessor: FCLS Investors Group
- Founded: 1984; 42 years ago
- Headquarters: Oak Brook, Illinois, United States
- Key people: Jim Clewlow (President & CEO, 2025-Present); Robert Chapman (President & CEO, 2013-2025); Michael M. Mullen (President & CEO, 2001-2011); Paul Fisher (President, 2011)
- Owner: CalPERS
- Subsidiaries: Capital and Regional plc
- Website: www.centerpoint.com

CenterPoint Properties is a company that invests in, develops, and manages industrial real estate in the U.S. The company owns more than 300 properties comprising more than 60 million square feet of warehouse space, including the CenterPoint Intermodal Center. The company is wholly owned by CalPERS, which has engaged with GI Partners for management services of CenterPoint since 2010.

== Timeline ==
In 1984, the company was launched as Capital and Regional Properties Corporation, the U.S. subsidiary of Capital and Regional plc.

In 1993, the company acquired FCLS Investors Group and became a public company via an initial public offering.

In March 2001, the company began development of the $58 million, 436,000 square foot Chicago International Produce Market.

In July 2001, the company invested $56 million in 9 suburban buildings and sold an apartment complex, 4 industrial buildings and a 42-acre land parcel in Aurora, Illinois for $48 million.

In October 2001, the company began development of O'Hare Express North.

In 2001, Michael M. Mullen became president and chief operating officer of the company. In 2004, he was promoted to chief executive officer.

In 2002, the company broke ground on an automotive supplier manufacturing campus in partnership with Ford Motor Company.

In 2006, the co-chairman of the company, John Gates Jr., came under scrutiny for his part ownership in 2 corporate jets with one of the company's top vendors.

In 2006, the company was acquired by a joint venture between CalPERS and LaSalle Investment Management.

In 2008, the company began construction of the CenterPoint Intermodal Center, a 3,600 acre facility that cost $1.26 billion and opened in 2010. The company also began construction of the CenterPoint-KCS Intermodal Center in partnership with Kansas City Southern Railroad at the former Richards-Gebaur Air Force Base.

In 2010, the company partnered with Zimmer Real Estate Services to begin redevelopment the Kansas City Plant pursuant to a lease with the General Services Administration on behalf of the National Nuclear Security Administration. In 2014, the company began an environmental review of the site.

In 2011, Mullen retired as chief executive officer and was replaced by Paul Fisher, president of the company.

In May 2015, the company broke ground on a 450,660-square-foot speculative building at the CenterPoint-KCS Intermodal Center.

In September 2015, Caterpillar Inc. announced that it may end production at its hydraulics plant in Joliet, Illinois that is leased from the company until 2018.

On July 20, 2021, Government and corporate officials gathered for a groundbreaking ceremony for the Houbolt Road Extension Project, a public-private partnership between CenterPoint and United Bridge Partners.

On November 26, 2023 Local and state officials gathered at the Houbolt Road Ribbon-Cutting, celebrating the on-time, on-budget completion of a 1.4-mile, $140‑million bridge over the Des Plaines River—a landmark public‑private partnership between CenterPoint and United Bridge Partners.

== See also ==
- Edison Properties
