= Kansas City National Security Campus =

Nuclear weapons plant

Coordinates: 38.861973°N 94.552716°W

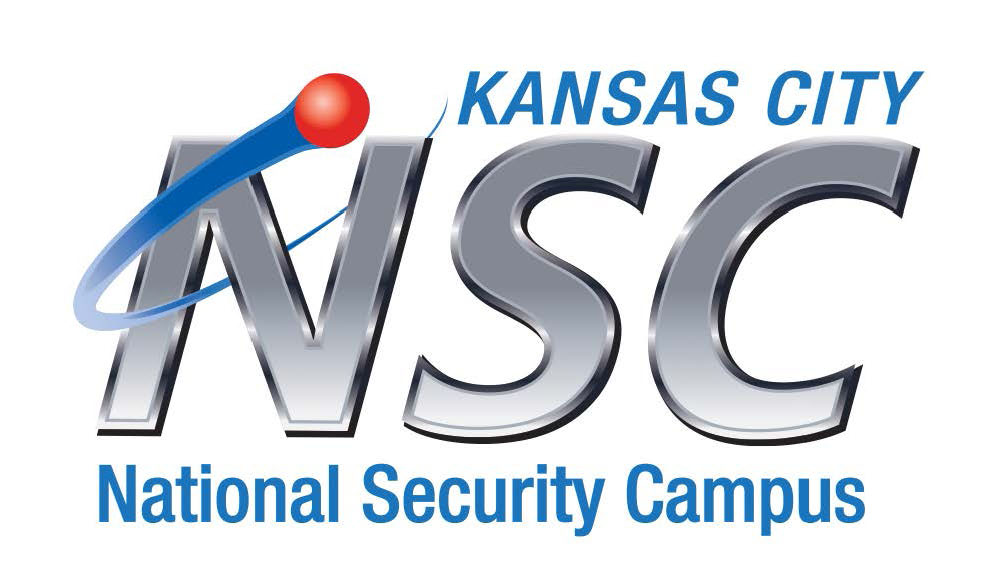
Color logo of the Kansas City National Security Campus

The Kansas City National Security Campus (KCNSC), formerly known as the Kansas City Plant, is a National Nuclear Security Administration (NNSA) facility managed and operated by Honeywell Federal Manufacturing & Technologies that manufactures "80 percent of non-nuclear components that go into the [United States] nuclear stockpile."

The plant produces non-nuclear mechanical, electronic, and engineered material components for U.S. national defense systems such as high-energy laser ignition systems, microwave hybrid microcircuit production, and miniature electromechanical devices. It also provides technical services such as metallurgical/mechanical analysis, analytical chemistry, environmental testing, nondestructive testing, computer-based training, simulations and analysis, and technical certification.

== History ==
The plant traces its history to the Pratt & Whitney plant dedicated by then Senator Harry S. Truman in 1942, which manufactured Double Wasp engines during World War II. In 1949 the Atomic Energy Commission commissioned the Bendix Corporation (specifically, the Bendix Aviation Corporation) to build the non-nuclear components of nuclear warheads there. Bendix became AlliedSignal in 1983 and eventually Honeywell in 1999. Workers at the site are represented by the International Association of Machinists and Aerospace Workers (IAMAW).

== Kansas City National Security Campus ==
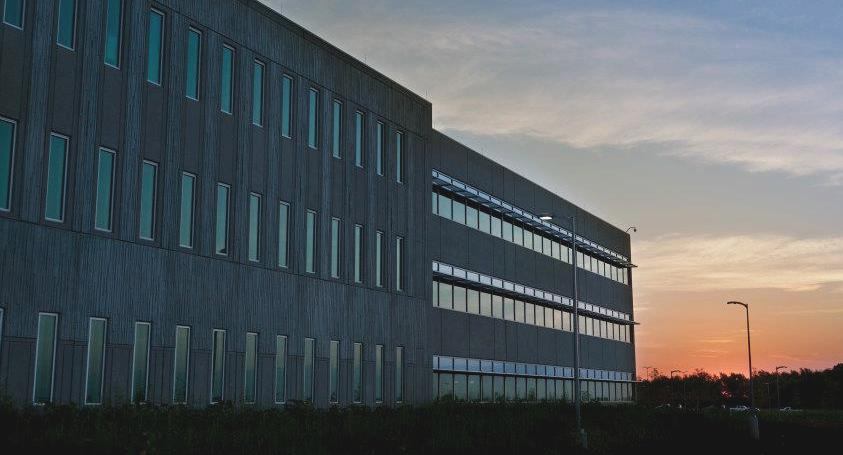
Kansas City National Security Campus, 14520 Botts Road, Kansas City, Missouri

In 2014, the Kansas City Plant moved to the renamed Kansas City National Security Campus, a state-of-art facility including manufacturing, laboratory, office, and warehouse space. The move saves the government about $100 million annually in operating costs and cut energy consumption by more than 50 percent.

The smaller, more efficient facility maintains the capability to assure the reliability, safety, and security of the nation's nuclear deterrent while enabling NNSA to recruit and retain the next generation of scientists and engineers.

Initially announced in 2009, the General Services Administration announced that Zimmer Real Estate Services and CenterPoint Properties had won a bid to build the replacement plant. The site, adjacent to the former Richards-Gebaur Air Force Base in south Kansas City near Grandview, Missouri. Zimmer and CenterPoint already owned the CenterPoint Intermodal Center across the street. The creative ownership method works this way: a government authority (the Kansas City Planned Industrial Expansion Authority) owns the land and improvements and leases the project to CPZ Holding LLC. CPZ Holding subleases it to CenterPoint Zimmer LLC, which sub-subleases it to the government. Upon expiration of the government authority's lease, CPZ Holding will own the project. Financing for the $750+ million project cost was structured and provided by CGA Capital. In March 2017 affiliates of CGA Capital acquired all of the interests of and in CPZ Holding from CenterPoint Properties and its partners, and will own the project upon expiration of the government authority's lease.

HNTB Architecture designed the campus, Gibbens Drake Scott Inc. designed the mechanical, electrical, and plumbing features, which consist of 1.5 million rentable square feet on the northwest corner of Missouri Highway 150 and Botts Road on the north edge of Richards-Gebaur.

The developers pay more than $5 million a year in lieu of property taxes. Half is used to retire the debt service on $40 million worth of public infrastructure improvements and half funds local tax agencies.
