= LGBTQ Veterans Memorial =

LGBTQ Veterans Memorial may refer to:

- A monument honoring LGBT veterans at the Abraham Lincoln National Cemetery in Elwood, Illinois
- California LGBTQ Veterans Memorial, at Desert Memorial Park in Cathedral City, California
