= Theodore Hyatt =

American Civil War Medal of Honor recipient

George Theodore Hyatt
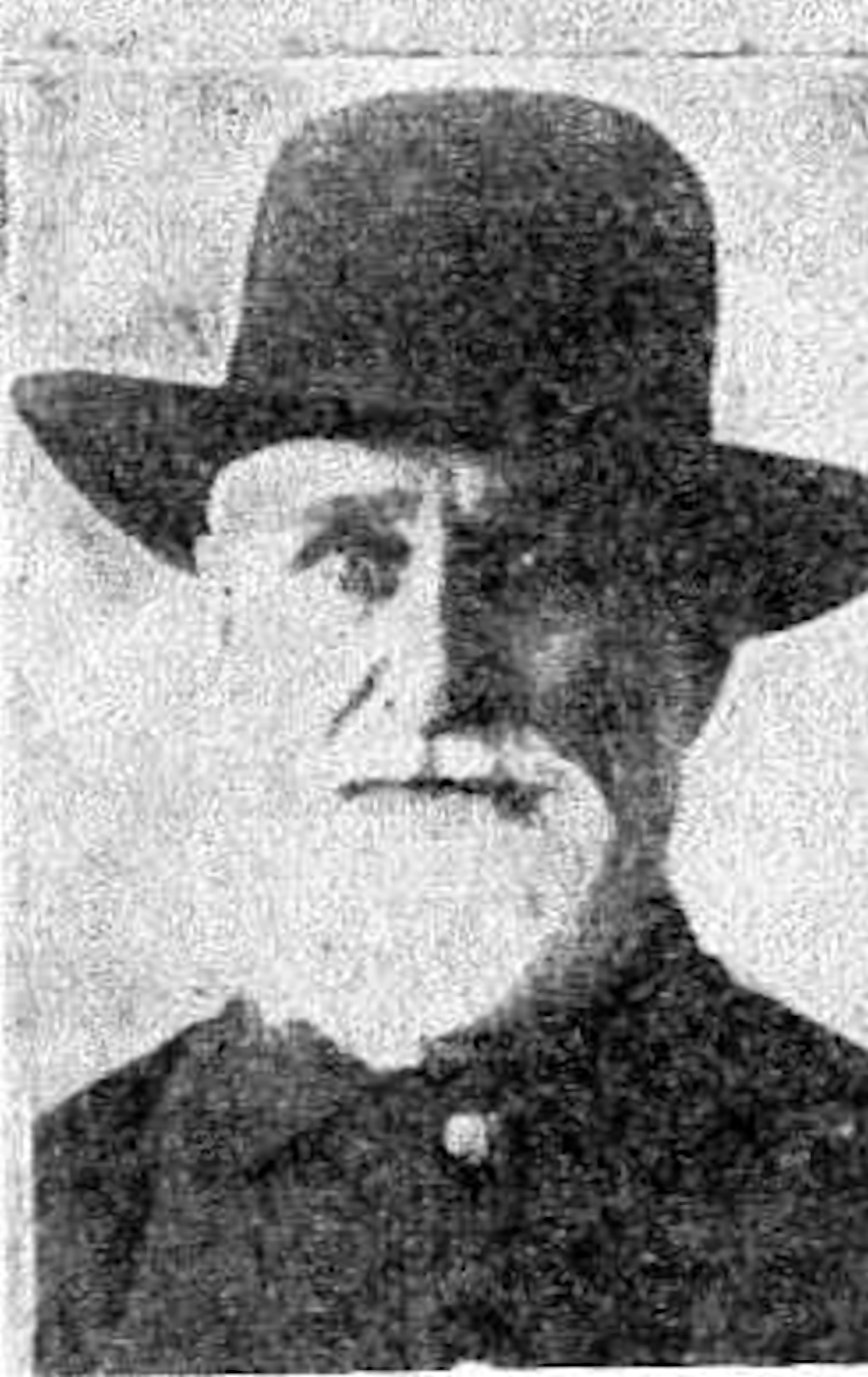
- Hyatt in c. 1899
- Born: July 3, 1830; Milton, Pennsylvania
- Died: May 7, 1900 (aged 69); Joliet, Illinois
- Burial place: Abraham Lincoln National Cemetery, Elwood, Illinois
- Military career
- Allegiance: United States
- Branch: United States Army; Union Army
- Service years: 1862–1865
- Rank: First Sergeant
- Units: Company D, 127th Illinois Volunteer Infantry Regiment
- Conflicts: American Civil War • Siege of Vicksburg
- Awards: Medal of Honor

George Theodore Hyatt (1830–1900) was a Union Army soldier during the American Civil War. He was awarded the Medal of Honor for gallantry during the Siege of Vicksburg on May 22, 1863.

Hyatt joined the 127th Illinois Infantry in August 1862, and was discharged in March 1865 for a wound received during the Atlanta campaign.

== Union assault ==
On May 22, 1863, General Ulysses S. Grant ordered an assault on the Confederate heights at Vicksburg, Mississippi. The plan called for a storming party of volunteers to build a bridge across a moat and plant scaling ladders against the enemy embankment in advance of the main attack. The volunteers knew the odds were against survival and the mission was called, in nineteenth century vernacular, a "forlorn hope". Only single men were accepted as volunteers and even then, twice as many men as needed came forward and were turned away. The assault began in the early morning following a naval bombardment. The Union soldiers came under enemy fire immediately and were pinned down in the ditch they were to cross. Despite repeated attacks by the main Union body, the men of the forlorn hope were unable to retreat until nightfall. Of the 150 men in the storming party, nearly half were killed. Seventy-nine of the survivors were awarded the Medal of Honor.

== Interment ==
George Hyatt is interred in Section 1, Site 1613 at the Abraham Lincoln National Cemetery in Elwood, Illinois.

== Medal of Honor citation ==
"For gallantry in the charge of the volunteer storming party on 22 May 1863."

== See also ==
- List of Medal of Honor recipients
- List of American Civil War Medal of Honor recipients: G–L
