= Joliet Army Ammunition Plant =

United States Army arsenal in Illinois

Coordinates: 41.3744444°N 88.1255556°W

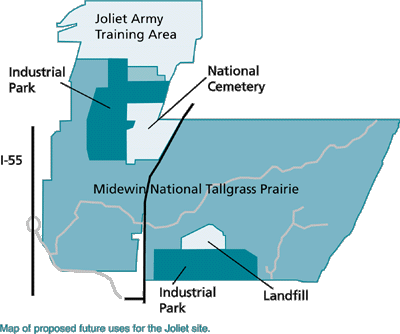
Proposed redevelopment of Joliet Arsenal, February 2002. Drawn with North at the top, the arsenal was bisected by Illinois Route 53 with Kankakee Ordnance Works in the west portion and Elwood Ordnance Plant on the east.

Joliet Army Ammunition Plant (JOAAP, formerly known as the Joliet Arsenal) was a United States Army arsenal located in Will County, Illinois, near Elwood, Illinois, south of Joliet, Illinois. Opened in 1940 during World War II, the facility consisted of the Elwood Ordnance Plant (EOP) and the Kankakee Ordnance Works (KNK). In 1945, the two were deactivated and combined forming the Joliet Arsenal. The plant was reactivated for the Korean War and renamed Joliet Army Ammunition Plant during the Vietnam War. Production of TNT ended in 1976, and the major plant operations closed shortly after in the late 1970s. The facility briefly revived an automated load-assemble-pack (LAP) artillery shell operation that was managed by the Honeywell Corporation during the Reagan administration in the 1980s before it was finally closed.

Portions of the site have been redeveloped forming the CenterPoint Intermodal Center, Abraham Lincoln National Cemetery and Midewin National Tallgrass Prairie.

== Pre-World War II ==
Before the Second World War, the land in Jackson Township, Will County, Illinois, where the Joliet Arsenal was built consisted mostly of small family farms some of which were owned and managed by descendants of pioneer Illinois settlers. The federal government acquired some of the land in Jackson Township to build the Joliet Arsenal through eminent domain. Prior to the plant's construction, there were 450 farms that had to be vacated by March 1, 1941. Initially there was some resistance from local farmers relating to prices and moving problems, but 90% of the land was paid for through negotiated settlements. The entire land acquisition cost the government $5 million for the 40,000-acre (160 km^{2}) project. Ten preexisting farmhouses were moved from their original locations and used as staff housing. Six cemeteries were also on the property and they were maintained in place by the operating contractor.

== World War II ==
Location in Illinois

The United States had very little capacity for manufacturing military munitions in 1939 when World War II broke out. Since the manufacture of munitions required specialized equipment and techniques there were no existing plants that could be converted. The solution to the lack of capacity was to create a large network of interlocking ammunition plants. They would be government-owned, but contractor-operated (GOCO). More than 60 plants would be constructed between June 1940 and December 1942.

The Elwood Ordnance Plant, named for Elwood, Illinois, and the Kankakee Ordnance Works, named for the Kankakee River, were two of the first five to be constructed. In September 1940, Stone and Webster Engineering of New York was awarded the contract to construct the Kankakee Ordnance Works. Another New York firm, Sanderson and Porter, received the contract for the Elwood Ordnance Plant soon after. Construction on both plants began November 1940, with Elwood beginning production July 12, 1941, followed by Kankakee in September. The plants were separate since they had different purposes, Kankakee manufactured various types of explosives for use at other plants and Elwood loaded artillery shells, bombs, mines and other munitions.

E. I. du Pont de Nemours and Company, an experienced explosives manufacturer, was selected to operate the Kankakee plant while Sanderson and Porter would operate the Elwood facility. In April 1944, United States Rubber Company would replace DuPont as contractor at the Kankakee facility. TNT production at the Kankakee works occurred until August 1945 with a peak output of 5.5 million short tons (5.0×10^{6} t) per week. In November 1945, Elwood and Kankakee were combined to form the Joliet Arsenal. Following the war, the site was not completely inactive; DuPont leased space to manufacture ammonium nitrate for fertilizer. Over 10,425 people were employed at the two plants during the peak production of World War II. Elwood loaded more than 926 million bombs, shells, mines, detonators, fuzes, and boosters, and Kankakee produced over 1 billion pounds (450,000 t) of TNT.

== Plant explosion ==
Though both plants were designed with safety as a primary concern, at 2:45 a.m. on June 5, 1942, a large explosion on the assembly line at the Elwood facility resulted in 48 dead or missing and was felt as far as Waukegan, Illinois, over 60 miles (97 km) north. Assembly Lines were located in separate buildings which were separated by substantial distances limiting major damage to the facility as a whole.

From a United Press newspaper article written at the time, "Explosion shattered buildings of one of the units of the $30,000,000 Elwood Ordnance plant gave up the bodies of 21 workers Friday. Army officials said 36 more were missing from the blast that could be felt for a radius of 100 miles. Another 41 were injured, five of them critically, from the explosion that leveled a building.... Not one of the 68 men inside the shipping unit when the blast occurred escaped death or injury."

"The explosion put one of the 12 production units out of action temporarily, but operations continued in the others."

== Korean War ==
Production resumed in 1952 after rehabilitation of the facility by the United States Army Corps of Engineers. The Kankakee portion was used to manufacture TNT under the control of contractor United States Rubber Company while Elwood operated under U.S. government control. Following the Korean war, Elwood would continue production in a limited capacity until deactivated in 1965. Kankakee production would end in 1957.

== Vietnam War ==
The Elwood unit was reopened in 1966 and would produce artillery rounds, supplementary charge assemblies and cluster bomb units. The Kankakee unit was reopened in 1965 and would manufacture TNT until 1976. During the Vietnam War the Joliet Arsenal was renamed Joliet Army Ammunition Plant. The majority of operations at the facility were terminated by the late 1970s.

== Redevelopment ==
In 1993, 23,500 acres (95 km^{2}) of land was declared to be excess. Remediation of the site occurred prior to the redevelopment. Redevelopment plans included around 3,000 acres (12 km^{2}) for two industrial parks, 455 acres (1.8 km^{2}) for the Will County Landfill, 982 acres (4.0 km^{2}) for the Abraham Lincoln National Cemetery, and 19,000 acres (77 km^{2}) for the Midewin National Tallgrass Prairie. The government retained a portion as the Joliet Army Training Area. The industrial parks are composed of the largest inland intermodal center in the country, CenterPoint Intermodal Center which is served by the Union Pacific Railroad and the BNSF Railway, and a 3,400,000-square-foot (320,000 m^{2}) Walmart distribution facility.

== Environmental issues ==
The EPA maintains portions of the property on the Superfund National Priorities List. Cleanup includes composting by the Army Corps of Engineers. The cemetery and industrial parks were on the buffer portion of the facility, and there was little or no cleanup required. However, portions of the site that became Midewin National Tallgrass Prairie were heavily contaminated. Some of the clean-up included disposing of live explosive cartridges and shells using controlled explosions. The explosives to be cleaned up were buried by the army in unknown years. The residents of surrounding small towns could hear the controlled explosions being used in the disposal activity from 2–3 miles away.

In early 2008, site cleanup was finished three years ahead of schedule, while groundwater monitoring remains ongoing. Part of the prairie restoration at Midewin includes introducing American bison to graze on an experimental basis on approximately 1,200 acres of fenced pasture located within the Prairie’s 19,000 total acres. In October 2015, the U.S. Forest Service announced the arrival of 27 American bison to the prairie.

== See also ==
- Alabama Army Ammunition Plant
- Badger Army Ammunition Plant
- Green River Ordnance Plant - Lee County, Illinois
- Indiana Army Ammunition Plant
- Lake City Army Ammunition Plant
- Rock Island Arsenal - Another US Army Arsenal in Illinois
- Sunflower Army Ammunition Plant
