= Sexual orientation and gender identity in the Australian military =

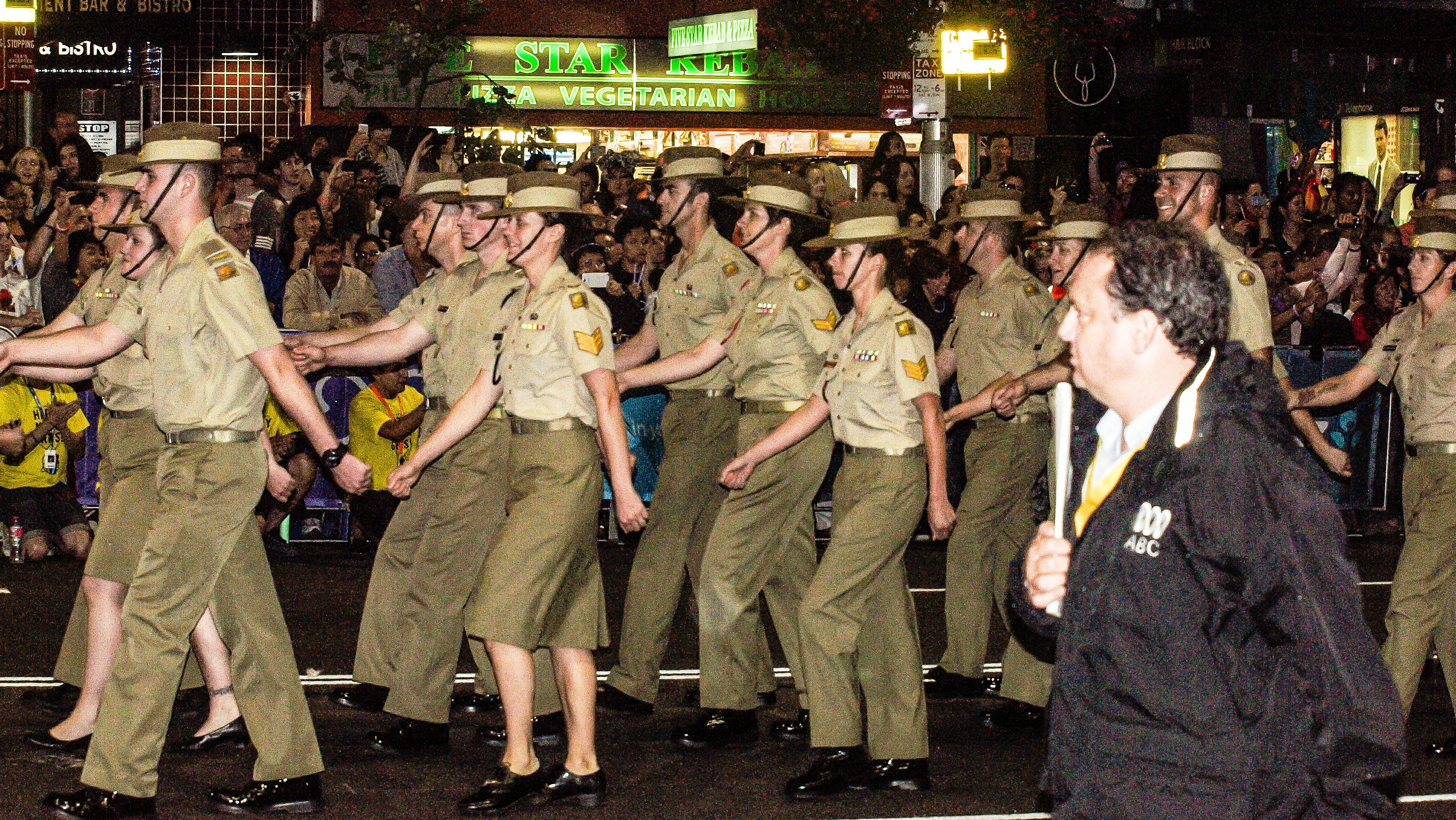
Members of the Australian Army marching in the 2013 Sydney Gay and Lesbian Mardi Gras

Sexual orientation and gender identity in the Australian military are not considered disqualifying matters in the 21st century, with the Australian Defence Force (ADF) allowing LGBT people to serve openly and access the same entitlements as other personnel. The ban on gay and lesbian personnel was lifted by the Keating government in 1992, with a 2000 study finding no discernible negative impacts on troop morale. In 2009, the First Rudd government introduced equal entitlements to military retirement pensions and superannuation for the domestic partners of LGBTI personnel. Since 2010, transgender personnel may serve openly and may undergo gender transition with ADF support while continuing their military service. LGBTI personnel are also supported by the charity DEFGLIS, the Defence Force Lesbian Gay Bisexual Transgender and Intersex Information Service.

== Gay, lesbian and bisexual personnel ==
=== Historical prohibition ===
Homosexuals were not permitted to join the Australian armed forces until 1992. Gay and lesbian personnel who evaded this ban ran the risk of being dismissed from the military if their sexual orientation was discovered; this tended to be more strictly enforced during peacetime than wartime. Nevertheless, many homosexual personnel served in the military during the world wars, Korean War and Vietnam War, with their comrades often being aware of their orientation and accepting of it.

The Australian military prohibited "unnatural offences" or "conduct prejudicial to good order and discipline" from the time of the Boer War, with the Australian Army introducing a specific anti-homosexuality policy after World War II at the urging of the United States military, who had witnessed homosexual acts between Australian troops in Papua New Guinea. From 1974 to 1992, the Australian military services had consistent policies against LGB personnel, who could be subject to surveillance, interviews, secret searches and discharge from the military.

The ban on homosexuals reflected both social attitudes at the time and British military law, which directly governed discipline in the armed forces until 1985. An Australian Defence Force Discipline Act was enacted in 1985, and the Australian Defence Force (ADF) set out its position on homosexuality the next year. This statement maintained the ban on homosexual behaviour among service personnel, on the grounds that it would erode command relationships and morale, raise risks of blackmail, create health problems and endanger minors. However, it did not require that homosexual personnel be automatically dismissed, with their commanding officer having a degree of discretion in the matter. Few homosexual personnel were dismissed during the period this statement was in force.

=== Lifting the ban ===
During the 1980s and early 1990s, gay and human rights activists sought to have the ban on homosexuals serving in the ADF lifted. In 1992 a female reservist in the Australian Army made a complaint to the Human Rights and Equal Opportunities Commission on the basis that she was dismissed on the grounds of homosexuality. The Commission called for a review of the longstanding ban on LGBT military personnel, leading to extensive debate among politicians and members of the ADF.

In June 1992, Defence Minister Senator Robert Ray responded by instead reaffirming the prohibition on homosexuality in Australia's armed forces, accepting a recommendation by service chiefs and strengthening the existing ban on LGBT personnel by including the definition of "unacceptable sexual acts" as inclusive of sexual harassment and offences under civil and military law. Adrian d'Hagé, a public relations officer in the Defence Department told media that the presence of an admitted homosexual in defence units could be divisive.

Senator Ray's decision led to significant outrage and was opposed by several Labor party politicians of the day, including Attorney-General Michael Duffy. In response Prime Minister Paul Keating established a special Labor Caucus Committee to examine the possibility of removing the ban on LGBT personnel in the military, to be chaired by Senator Terry Aulich. The Caucus Committee heard from many stakeholders including the Defence Chiefs. By September 1992, the committee had returned with a recommendation to remove the ban by four votes to two, with support from Aulich, Stephen Loosley, Olive Zakharov and Duncan Kerr and opposition from Ted Grace and Brian Courtice. Despite opposition to change from certain military groups and the RSL, this recommendation received support from Human Rights Commissioner Brian Burdekin and Attorney General Michael Duffy.

On 23 November 1992, the First Keating Ministry met to consider whether the military ban on homosexuals should be lifted, despite Senator Ray's opposition within Cabinet. Following the meeting, Prime Minister Paul Keating announced that the Government had decided to end discrimination preventing homosexual people serving in the defence forces, effective immediately. Keating, who had supported overturning the ban, stated that the decision "reflected community support for the removal of employment discrimination and brings the ADF into line with tolerant attitudes of Australians generally ... The ADF acknowledges there are male and female homosexuals among its members and has advised the Government that these members are no longer actively sought out or disciplined because of their sexual orientation." This outcome was heavily influenced by a perception in Cabinet that if they did not lift the ban, the issue would continue to be raised and the ADF needed to adapt to the changing social attitudes towards homosexuality as soon as possible.

Opposition defence spokesman Alexander Downer told media that, if elected, the Coalition would immediately reinstate the ban if the service chiefs were to advise for it: at that time the chiefs remained in favour of such a ban.

=== Military benefits ===
In 2003, the Howard government blocked same-sex partners of military personnel from receiving the benefits of a support program that partners in heterosexual relationships were able to access. Since 1 January 2009, same-sex couples within the Australian Military, are treated the same as de facto mixed-sex couples, that extends many military benefits (e.g. Defence housing and superannuation).

=== Growing inclusion ===
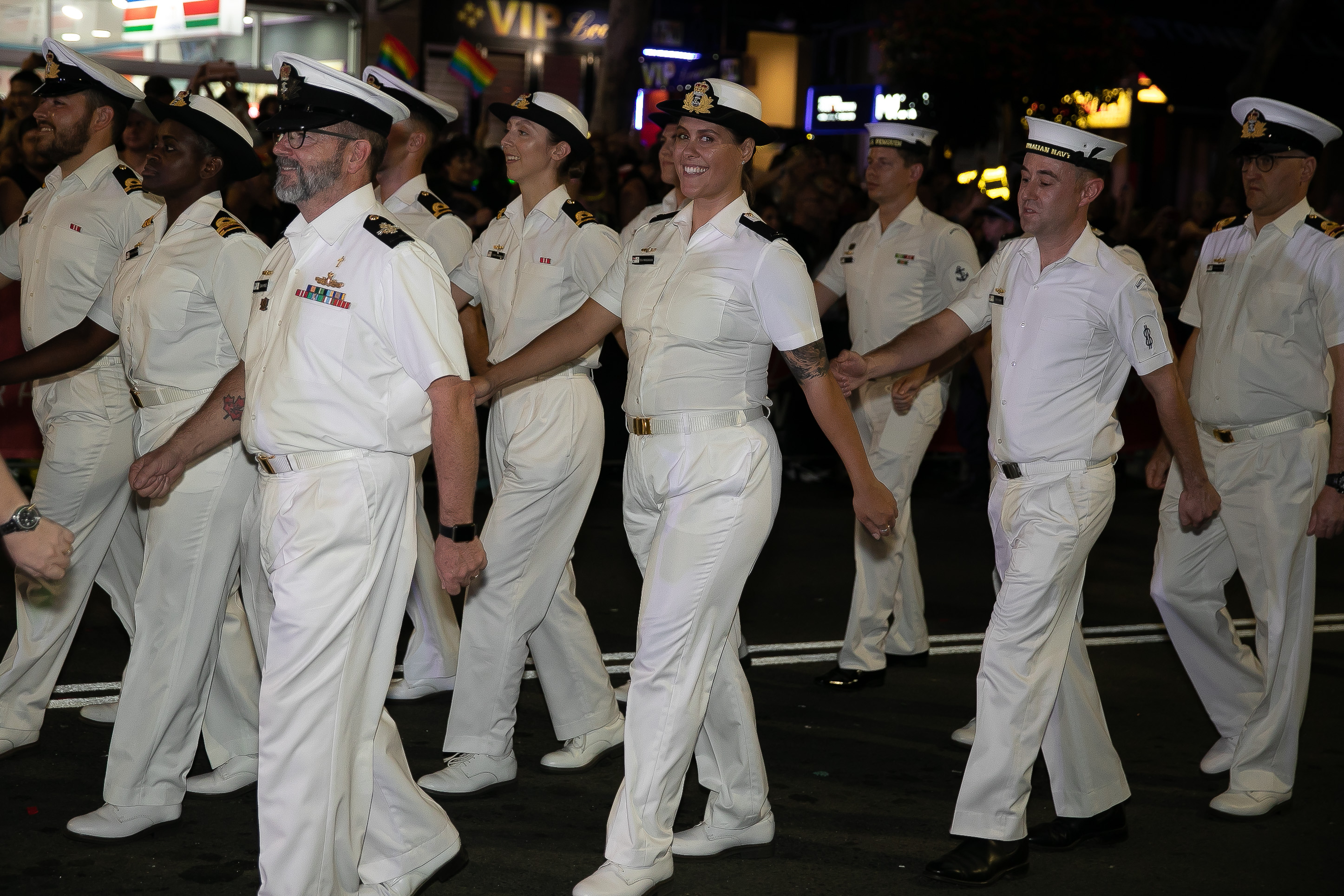
Royal Australian Navy personnel marching in the 2020 Sydney Gay and Lesbian Mardi Gras

By the 2000s the ADF was seeking to actively engage the gay and lesbian community. An official defence contingent joined the Sydney Gay and Lesbian Mardi Gras for the first time in 2008 and the contingent marched in uniform for the first time in 2013. Unofficial support groups had marched in the parade from 1996, initially against the wishes of the ADF's headquarters.

Acknowledging the 20th anniversary of the lifting of the ban in November 2012, Chief of the Defence Force David Hurley said he was proud of the diversity of Australia's military. Hurley also noted that he regards diversity as being an asset for the ADF. Nevertheless, the ADF continued to have a reputation at this time for homophobia. A 2013 survey of gay Army personnel found that 59 per cent of respondents had not experienced harassment due to their sexuality, but 30 per cent hid their sexuality from other soldiers.

In 2013 the Department of Defence commissioned Army pride cufflinks and lapel pins which combine the Rising Sun badge with a rainbow flag.

== Transgender personnel ==
In 2010 ADF policy was amended to allow transgender Australians to openly serve without the risk of being discharged. The policy was updated following the advocacy of Captain Bridget Clinch, who lodged a complaint with the Australian Human Rights Commission when the Army sought to dismiss her when she began the process of transitioning.

The free medical services all members of the ADF receive as part of their service contract includes treatment for gender dysphoria. A Department of Defence spokesperson stated in 2015 that this can include meeting the costs of "some but not all aspects of the management of gender dysphoria, including surgery", with the level of assistance provided generally being set at a level equivalent to that available to all Australians through Medicare.

In 2017, from ADF records between November 2012 and March 2016, 27 ADF members received treatment for gender dysphoria. Seventeen had sex-change surgery. Ten of those were male-to-female reassignments at a cost of $1,052,330, not including the cost of ADF dispensed pharmaceuticals, or the cost of transition leave. For the ADF, "challenges posed by transgender personnel" include non-deployable periods and the use of toilets and bathrooms. Sex discrimination laws may be exempted by the ADF for gender-neutral personnel who are employed in key roles.

The ADF's financial support for gender dysphoria treatment was criticised in October 2017 by conservative politicians including Pauline Hanson, Cory Bernardi and Andrew Hastie. It was defended by the Defence Minister Marise Payne, Labor Defence Personnel spokesperson Amanda Rishworth, trans former army personnel Cate McGregor and Bridget Clinch.

The RAAF has produced a document for Airforce Cadets entitled Gender Transition Guidelines designed to build understanding and respect within the organisation. In conjunction with the International Day Against Homophobia and Transphobia (IDAHOT) the RAAF is creating opportunities to partner with LGBTI-supporting agencies.

== Intersex personnel ==
A report from 2017 by ABC Online stated that intersex personnel of the Australian military have had their history and contributions largely scrubbed out, much like other queer people and that their history was still being attempted to be rediscovered. During the "25 years of diversity" celebration for the armed forces intersex people were honored and included with other queer people. In their 2018 book Serving in Silence? Noah Riseman, Shirleene Robinson and Graham Willett acknowledged the lack of perspective and representation from intersex people in their work, they account for this by explaining that the Australian Defence Force never had official policies regarding intersex people and that it was purely considered a medical condition which would mean that the nature of it would determine if someone was allowed to serve, but either as a man or woman regardless of their ambiguous status, and the fact that the one intersex person they were able to interview provided them with content which they felt was too sensitive to share. Australia allows both non-binary trans people and intersex servicemen to use "X" on their papers.

== Effect of inclusion on troop morale ==
A study conducted in 2000 by Aaron Belkin and Jason McNichol found that the lifting of the ban on gay service had not led to any identifiable negative effects on troop morale, combat effectiveness, recruitment and retention or other measures of military performance. The study also found that the lifting of the ban may have contributed to improvements in productivity and working environments for service members. Similarly, Hugh Smith states in the Oxford Companion to Australian Military History that predictions of damage to the ADF's morale and mass-resignations if the ban was lifted did not eventuate, and the reform did not lead to any widespread or long-lasting problems.

== DFLGBTIS ==
The Defence Force Lesbian Gay Bisexual Transgender and Intersex Information Service (DFLGBTIS), founded in 2002 by Petty Officer Stuart O'Brien, supports and represents Australian Defence Force LGBTI personnel and their families. It does this through professional networking and peer support, by strengthening defence capability through greater inclusion of LGBTI people, and by educating defence about LGBTI matters.

DEFGLIS is registered with the Australian Charities and Not-for-profits Commission as a charity.

== HIV military policy ==
Since August 2024, a new recent “HIV military policy” was adopted and implemented by the Australian Defence Forces (ADF) - that allows current ADF members or those wanting to join the ADF on a case-by-case basis for HIV-positive individuals on health grounds alone (instead of being banned outright as was the case previously for many decades).

== See also ==
- Sexual orientation and gender identity in the Israeli military
- Sexual orientation and the military of the United Kingdom
- Sexual orientation and gender identity in the United States military
- Intersex people and military service
- Same-sex unions and military policy
- Sexual orientation and military service
- Transgender people and military service
