= Chicago International Produce Market =

Wholesale produce market in Chicago, Illinois, US

Coordinates: 41.84588°N 87.67300°W

Chicago International Produce Market (or CIPM) is a wholesale produce market in Chicago, Illinois. Its clientele include Midwest produce buyers representing supermarkets, independent markets, chain restaurants, and independent restaurants. The 450,000 square feet (42,000 m^{2}) building on the southwest side of Chicago is the largest facility of its kind in the midwestern United States.

== Location ==
The market is located on the near southwest side of Chicago, just north of the South Branch of the Chicago River, between Chicago's Pilsen and McKinley Park neighborhoods. It consists of a single building on a 26-acre (110,000 m^{2}) site. There are two entrances: one from the west on Damen Avenue, and one from the north near Blue Island Avenue. Traffic moves counterclockwise around the main building. The western side of the building is used for receiving, while the eastern side is used for loading.

CIPM is a focal point of food wholesale in Chicago, and several other food wholesalers are located within a mile radius.

== History ==
CIPM was built as the successor to South Water Market, which was located roughly 1-mile (1.6 km) northeast of the present site. By the late 20th century, South Water Market had unacceptable congestion and inadequate space.

On 10 July 2003, the Chicago Planning Commission granted its approval for the new site, which was developed by CenterPoint Properties anddesigned by Cornerstone Architects Ltd., Itasca, Illinois.

In 2001, it relocated to the large modern purpose-built facility at Chicago's Pilsen Industrial Corridor.

== Similar markets ==
- Hunts Point Cooperative Market
