= Xie Jianshun =

Taiwanese intersex soldier

- Born: 24 January 1918; Chaozhou, China
- Died: unknown
- Military career
- Allegiance: China

Xie Jianshun (Chinese: 謝尖順; born January 24, 1918 – ?) was a Taiwanese intersex man who gained considerable fame in 1953 when his variation was discovered by physicians of the Republic of China Armed Forces. He was considered by many to be the first Chinese "transsexual" when he underwent sex reassignment surgery and was frequently dubbed as the "Chinese Christine" due to both of them having been soldiers. This caused major cultural impact on the Taiwanese people as many felt it put the nation on the same level of development as the United States. Despite this, Xie did not want to transition from intersex to female but was encouraged to do so by medical professionals.

== Biography ==
=== Early life ===
Xie was born on January 24, 1918 in Chaozhou, Guandong, China. He joined the National Revolutionary Army when he was 16 and lost both of his parents by age 19. He moved to Taiwan in 1949.

=== Military service and diagnosis ===
Xie's intersex variation was discovered in 1953 due to him seeking medical attention after experiencing cramps, which turned out to be appendicitis. Xie had a penis and a very slim vaginal opening as well as internal gonads which contained both testicular and ovarian tissue; physicians determined that they could still produce eggs and that Xie's testicular tissue was deteriorating. Once Xie had been made aware of his variation, he was adamant about remaining male. He experienced slight physical dysphoria but had no social gender dysphoria about being male. Xie is even quoted to say, "If my biology does not allow me to remain a man but forces me to become a woman, what else can I do?" Due to this quote, many began to sympathize with Xie, viewing him as a "normal, however unfortunate, heterosexual man."

=== Surgeries and media attention ===
Xie went on to become the first person in Taiwan to have sex reassignment surgery. The intense media coverage of the case lead to the hospital staff and Xie's associates to have to try to keep the journalists away for the sake of Xie's privacy. At the beginning of this process, Xie's medical information was released to the media and reported on every time there was an operation. The media would use article titles like, "The Yin-Yang Person's Interior Parts Revealed Yesterday After Surgery: The Presence of Uterus and Ovaries Confirmed" to keep the public informed of the ongoing medical exploration of Xie. The physicians told the media what had been discovered during surgery before Xie had even woken up from surgery. They decided that since Xie had fully functioning female reproductive organs and less developed male reproductive organs, that the removal of the male organs was the best plan. The physicians believed that biology was more important than psychology in determining Xie's sex.

==== First operation ====
Xie's first surgery was an exploratory laparotomy. The United Daily News published a piece detailing the surgery for the public. The piece states, "The operation scheduled for today involves an exploratory laparotomy, followed by a careful examination of his lower cavity to detect the presence of uterus and ovary. If Xie's reproductive anatomy resembles that of a typical female, a second operation will follow suit as soon as Xie recovers from this one. In the second operation, the presently sealed vaginal opening will be cut open, and the vaginal interior will be examined for symptoms of abnormality. If the results of both operations confirm the Xie has a female reproductive system, the final step involves the removal of the symbolic male genital organ on the labia minora, converting him into a pure female. Otherwise, Xie will be turned into a pure male."

==== Second operation ====
Xie was forced to relocate to Taipei for the second operation. Xie initially refused to go and even wrote a letter to bureaucrats to express his desire to stay and be operated on in Tainan. Xie disclosed that his last menstrual cycle was very painful since there was only a slight vaginal opening. With another period on the horizon, Xie finally agreed to relocate in order to have the surgery before having to menstruate again. The second operation was also an exploratory laparotomy but this time they removed the internal male reproductive organs and took samples from his female reproductive organs.

==== Following operations ====
Xie's third operation replaced the penis with an artificial vaginal opening. The fourth operation was a vaginoplasty. Xie claimed to have had nine operations, however, the rest were not as publicized.

=== Later life ===
During the late 1950s, Xie changed his name to Xie Shun and began working at the Ta Tung Relief Institute for Women and Children. The Ministry of National Defense gave Xie 1000 New Taiwanese dollars to help him afford feminine clothing to help him feel more comfortable in his new identity. Xie was often compared to Christine Jorgensen in what was perceived by many to be a competition between American and Taiwanese science. The claims were that Xie, after surgery, was a "100% biological woman" whereas Christine was seen to be an "altered male".

== Cultural influence ==
Xie's emergence as the Taiwanese people's equivalent of Christine Jorgensen had great cultural impact on Taiwan, as many citizens felt that it helped put the nation on the same level as the United States. Because of the media frenzy surrounding Xie, newspapers in Taiwan began publishing far more accounts of intersex people, transgender people, and unusual medical variations of the body.

== See also ==
- Intersex people and military service
- Sexual orientation and gender identity in military service
- List of intersex people
