= Mary L. Petty =

American nurse

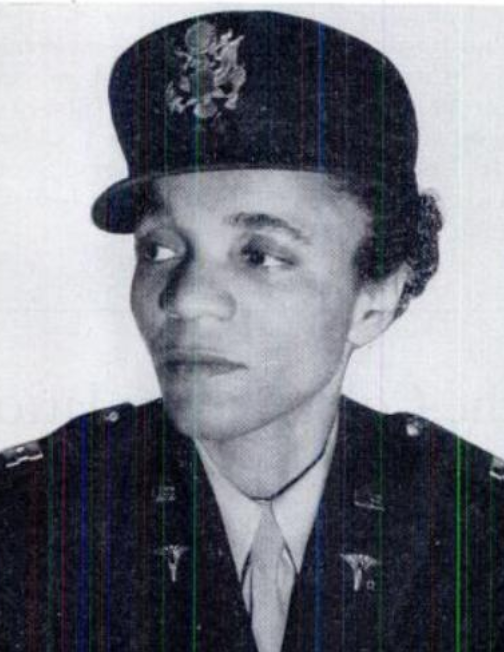
- Mary L. Petty in uniform, from a 1944 publication
- Born: January 4, 1916; Seattle, Washington
- Died: September 14, 2001 (aged 85); Illinois
- Occupations: Nurse, nursing educator
- Known for: 1st Black captain in US Army Nurse Corps (1944); led 1st contingent of Black nurses sent to Europe in WWII (1945)

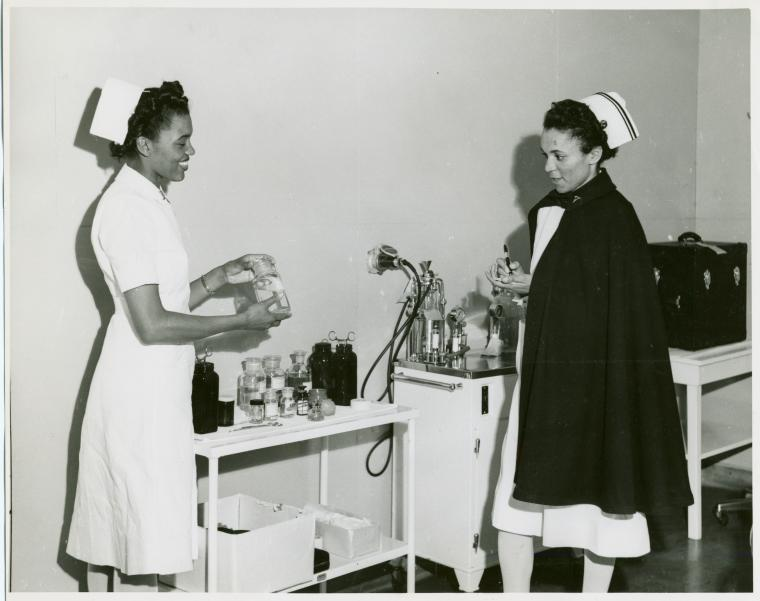
Captain Mary L. Petty, Chief Nurse, holding a glass bottle and showing it to 2nd Lieutenant Olive Bishop, who is writing on a small pad of paper

Mary Louise Petty (January 4, 1916 – September 14, 2001) was an American Army nurse and a pioneering figure in the racial integration of the United States Army Nurse Corps during World War II. She became the first African American nurse in the corps to achieve the rank of captain. In 1944, she was appointed to lead a nurse training program for Black women at Fort Huachuca, Arizona, and in 1945, she commanded the first group of African American nurses deployed to serve in the European Theater.

Petty’s leadership occurred during a national campaign led by civil rights groups to end racial exclusion in the military. Her promotion and overseas service preceded key federal desegregation policies, including President Truman’s Executive Order 9981, which formally ended segregation in the U.S. armed forces in 1948. Historians have described Petty’s career as both a professional milestone and a civil rights breakthrough, and her legacy continues to reflect broader efforts to advance equity in military and nursing institutions.

== Early life ==
Petty was born in Seattle, Washington and raised in Chicago, where she graduated from Wendell Phillips High School. She graduated from the Freedmen's Hospital School of Nursing in 1940.

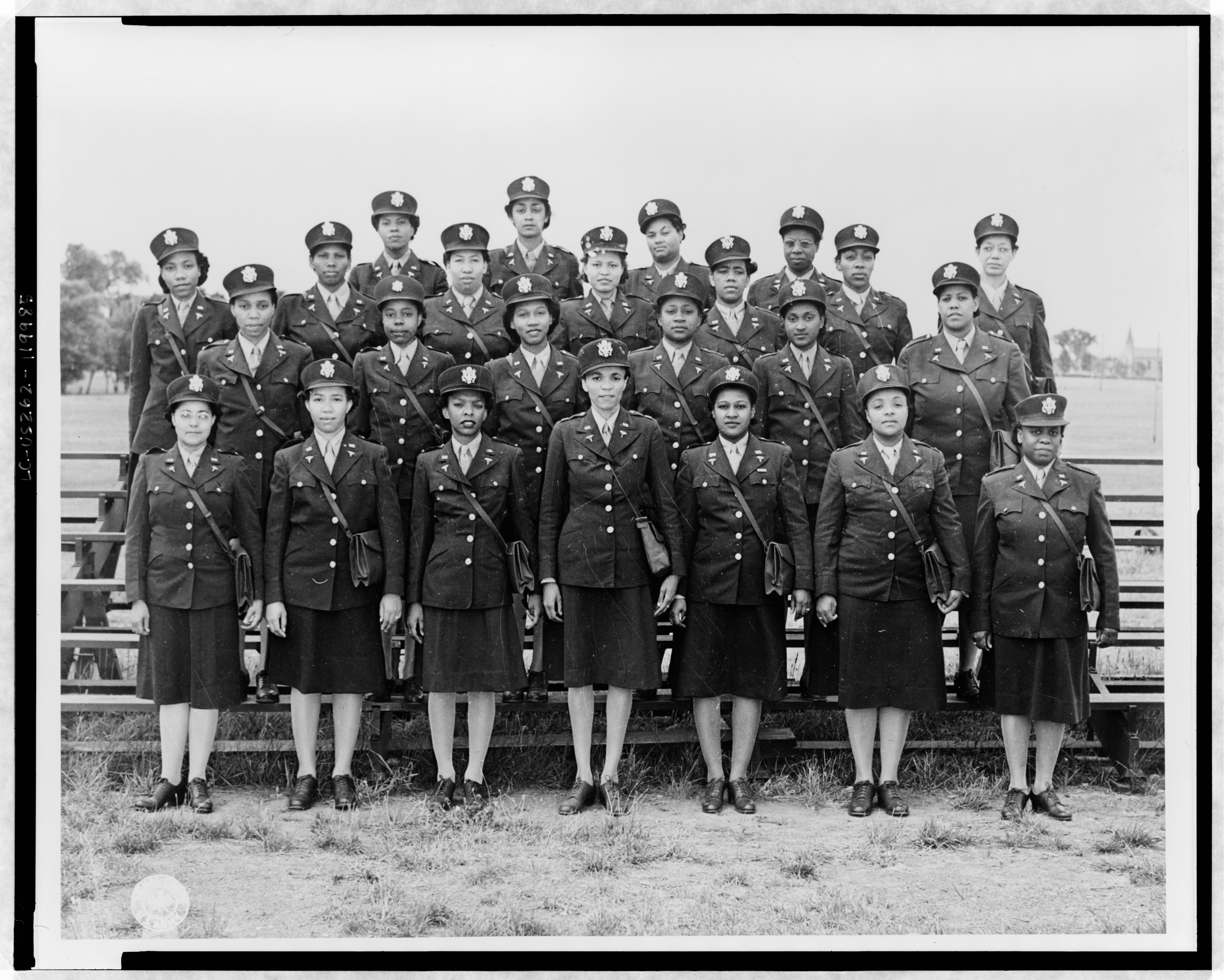
First black nurses land in England in 1944; Captain Mary L. Petty is in the center of the front row

== Career ==
Petty worked in hospitals in Virginia and New York after her training. She joined the US Army Nurse Corps in 1941. She served at Fort Bragg and then at Tuskegee, where she served under chief nurse Della H. Raney. Petty was the first Black member of the U.S. Army Nurse Corps to achieve the rank of captain. In early 1944 she was assigned to head a training center for Black nurses at Fort Huachuca, Arizona. In 1944, she led the first contingent of 63 Black American army nurses sent to serve in Europe.

Petty’s promotion and deployment occurred during a pivotal moment in the effort to integrate African American nurses into the U.S. military. At the time, the Army Nurse Corps largely excluded Black women from service, despite urgent wartime nursing shortages. Civil rights leaders, including the National Association of Colored Graduate Nurses and the NAACP, mounted sustained pressure on the War Department to end race-based exclusion. According to historian Charissa J. Threat, Petty’s leadership was part of a broader campaign that connected military service to African Americans’ struggle for full citizenship and professional equality. Her rise to captain and overseas leadership role symbolized a key victory in this civil rights effort.

Petty’s achievements also occurred within a military and professional landscape that had long been shaped by exclusionary ideals. Nursing was historically viewed as a white, middle-class, female occupation, and African American women like Petty had to confront the dual burdens of racial and gender discrimination to advance within the corps. Her promotion in 1944 predated key federal desegregation policies—including the Army-Navy Nurse Act of 1947 and President Truman’s Executive Order 9981—underscoring how African American nurses were already forcing institutional change from within. Petty’s career helped lay the groundwork for a gradual shift in military values, as the Army began, however reluctantly, to prioritize professional merit and readiness over racial segregation.

Petty was also active in the National Council of Catholic Nurses.

=== Integration of African American Nurses ===
During World War II, the U.S. Army Nurse Corps (ANC) maintained racially exclusionary policies that severely limited the number of African American nurses accepted into service. Despite widespread nursing shortages, the military resisted assigning Black nurses to treat white soldiers and often excluded them altogether. These policies reflected the broader segregationist framework of the U.S. armed forces during the war era.

A coordinated campaign by civil rights organizations, including the National Association of Colored Graduate Nurses (NACGN), the NAACP, and Black women leaders like Estelle Osborne, pressured the War Department to lift the racial barriers within the ANC. These groups launched letter-writing efforts, media campaigns, and personal appeals to military leadership, arguing that qualified Black nurses were being unjustly denied the opportunity to serve their country.

Advocates linked this struggle to the broader Double V campaign, which called for victory against fascism abroad and racism at home. African American nurses emphasized that their service represented not only patriotism but a claim to full citizenship and equality.

Captain Mary L. Petty’s promotion in 1944 and her leadership of the first group of African American nurses deployed to the European Theater in 1945 represented a turning point in this struggle. Her advancement was made possible by years of sustained activism and marked a significant step toward integration within the U.S. military.

Despite these gains, African American nurses continued to face discriminatory practices after their official inclusion. Many were segregated in assignments, denied leadership opportunities, and faced unequal access to resources and promotions compared to their white peers.

== Personal life ==
Mary L. Petty gave an interview in 2001 to the Chicago Tribune, about her "mostly fond memories" of being an Army nurse; at the time she was described as "nearly blind and suffering from depression and other maladies". She died a few months later, in September 2001, aged 85 years. Her grave is in the Abraham Lincoln National Cemetery in Illinois.

== Legacy ==
Captain Mary L. Petty’s career helped transform the Army Nurse Corps from an institution defined by racial and gender exclusion into one that began to reflect the principles of equal opportunity. Her elevation to the rank of captain and her leadership of the first overseas deployment of African American nurses in 1945 occurred at a time when such roles were virtually inaccessible to Black women. By achieving this status before formal desegregation policies were enacted, Petty demonstrated that African American women could succeed in leadership positions within the military, even in the face of institutional resistance.

Petty’s advancement also preceded and anticipated key federal civil rights policies. In 1941, President Franklin D. Roosevelt issued Executive Order 8802, which prohibited racial discrimination in the defense industry but did not desegregate the military. That would come later, in 1948, when President Harry S. Truman signed Executive Order 9981, formally mandating equality of treatment and opportunity in the U.S. armed forces regardless of race. Petty’s promotion to captain and her leadership of African American nurses overseas in 1945 took place before these federal mandates, demonstrating how African American women like her were already breaking barriers through service and leadership.

Historians have noted that Petty’s service reflects the contradictions of mid-20th-century America—where Black nurses were called to serve a nation that still denied them full citizenship. Through her example, the Army Nurse Corps became a platform through which African American women could assert both professional capability and claims to equal rights. Her career foreshadowed the broader transformations of the civil rights era, and her legacy continues to inspire discussions about race, gender, and equity in military and medical institutions.
