= Elwood, Illinois =

- Village
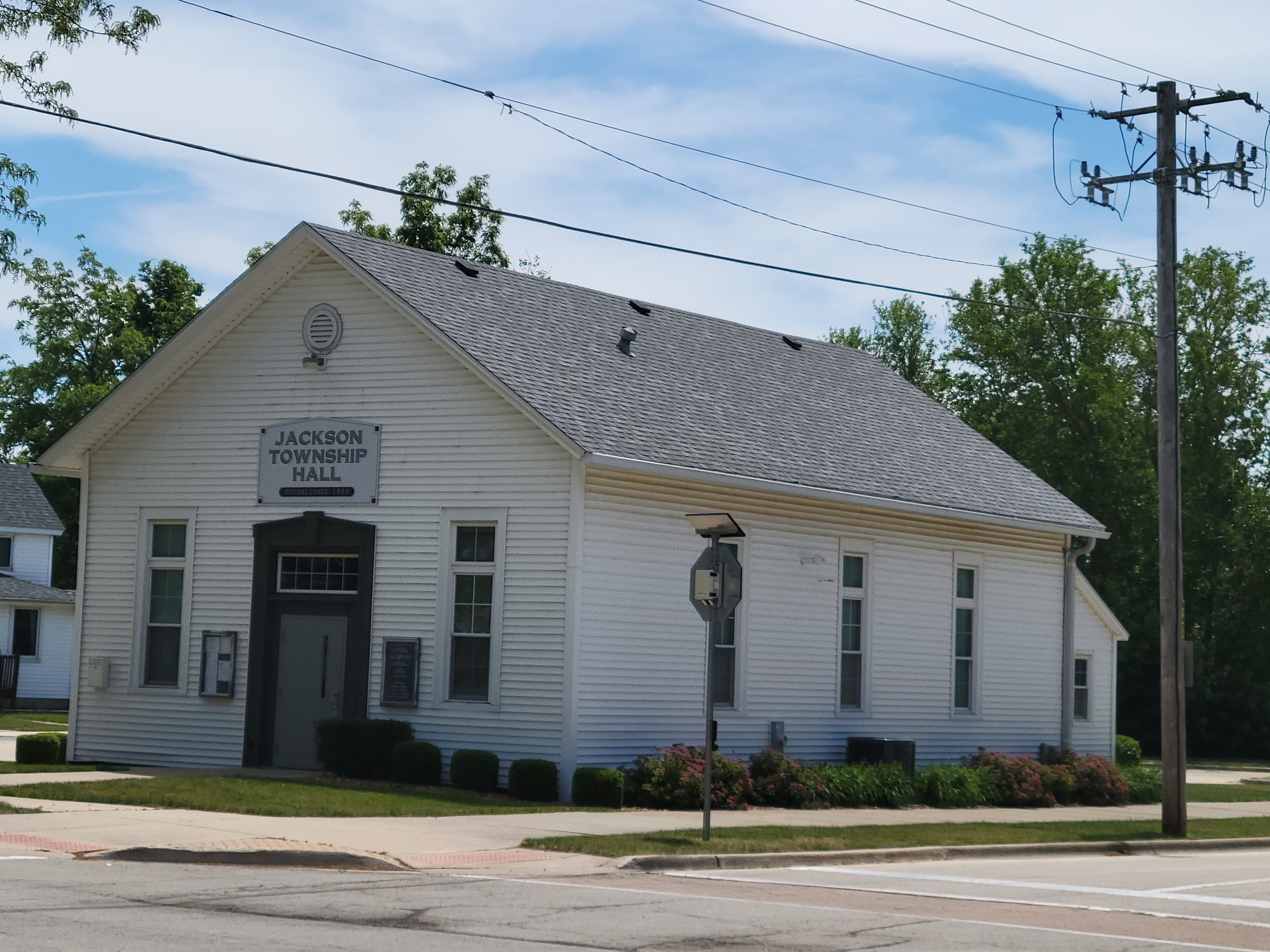
- Jackson Township Hall in Elwood

- Location of Elwood in Will County, Illinois.
- Coordinates: 41°24′25″N 88°07′12″W
- Country: United States
- State: Illinois
- County: Will

Area
  - Total: 13.80 sq mi (35.74 km^{2})
  - Land: 13.65 sq mi (35.35 km^{2})
  - Water: 0.15 sq mi (0.39 km^{2})
- Elevation: 656 ft (200 m)

Population (2020)
  - Total: 2,229
  - Density: 163.3/sq mi (63.05/km^{2})
- Time zone: UTC−6 (CST)
  - Summer (DST): UTC−5 (CDT)
- ZIP code: 60421
- Area code: 815
- FIPS code: 17-23945
- GNIS ID: 2398822
- Website: villageofelwood.com

Elwood is a village in rural Will County, Illinois, United States, approximately 45 miles southwest of Chicago. The population was 2,229 at the 2020 United States census, down from 2,279 in 2010.

== History ==
Elwood was founded in 1854 and incorporated as a village in 1869. The completion of the Joliet–Bloomington railroad, now part of the Union Pacific system, played a major role in the founding of Elwood. By 1900, Elwood was a small farming community with a population of about 400.

In the late 1930s, the federal government acquired nearby land for military training and weapons production, on which site the Joliet Arsenal was built and commenced operation in 1940. Arsenal construction played an important role in the development of Elwood and brought about 175 people into the area. In 1942, a massive explosion at the arsenal killed 42 workers and caused widespread damage.

In 1954, the village celebrated its centennial, and 20,000 people gathered to watch the parade. By 1970, Elwood had a population of about 750. On May 8, 1988, a tornado touched down about three miles (5 km) north of the village, uprooting large trees and heavily damaging some homes and pole buildings.

In 1990, the village began to experience more rapid growth. By 1996, Elwood's population rose to nearly 1,423, with development accelerated due to the construction of the CenterPoint Intermodal Center facility. The village's population peaked at 2,279, according to the 2010 US census, decreasing to 2,229, according to the 2020 US census. The Northern Illinois Planning Commission had projected that Elwood would have a population of nearly 20,000 by 2030, which given the 2.2. percent population contraction noted in the 2020 census, is not likely to be realized.

The Midewin National Tallgrass Prairie, a prairie reserve operated by the United States Forest Service is located on the site of the former Joliet Army Ammunition Plant near Elwood, and was established by federal law in 1996. In 1999, the 982 acre (397 ha) Abraham Lincoln National Cemetery was dedicated in Elwood. When fully completed, it will provide 400,000 burial spaces.

=== Fires ===
Three major fires have taken place in Elwood, the first on August 26, 1995, in which the fire station was destroyed. The second, which occurred on May 5, 2008, completely destroyed Bill's Inn. A residential fire in the Wyndstone Village subdivision on April 17, 2009, caused extensive damage to two townhomes.

== Geography ==
The nearest major highways are Interstate 80 to the north and Interstate 55 to the west. The former U.S. 66 highway passes through the village on the east side. According to the 2010 census, Elwood has a total area of 6.53 square miles (16.91 km^{2}), all land.

== Demographics ==
Historical population
Census	Pop.	Note	%±
1880	312		—
1890	243		−22.1%
1900	244		0.4%
1910	211		−13.5%
1920	212		0.5%
1930	257		21.2%
1940	248		−3.5%
1950	420		69.4%
1960	746		77.6%
1970	794		6.4%
1980	814		2.5%
1990	951		16.8%
2000	1,620		70.3%
2010	2,279		40.7%
2020	2,229		−2.2%
U.S. Decennial Census

=== Racial and ethnic composition ===
Elwood village, Illinois – Racial and ethnic composition Note: the US Census treats Hispanic/Latino as an ethnic category. This table excludes Latinos from the racial categories and assigns them to a separate category. Hispanics/Latinos may be of any race.
Race / Ethnicity (NH = Non-Hispanic)	Pop 2000	Pop 2010	Pop 2020	% 2000	% 2010	% 2020
White alone (NH)	1,536	2,071	1,915	94.81%	90.87%	85.91%
Black or African American alone (NH)	0	34	45	0.00%	1.49%	2.02%
Native American or Alaska Native alone (NH)	5	2	6	0.31%	0.09%	0.27%
Asian alone (NH)	5	11	13	0.31%	0.48%	0.58%
Native Hawaiian or Pacific Islander alone (NH)	0	0	1	0.00%	0.00%	0.04%
Other race alone (NH)	0	1	6	0.00%	0.04%	0.27%
Mixed race or Multiracial (NH)	9	16	50	0.56%	0.70%	2.24%
Hispanic or Latino (any race)	65	144	193	4.01%	6.32%	8.66%
Total	1,620	2,279	2,229	100.00%	100.00%	100.00%

=== 2020 census ===
As of the 2020 census, Elwood had a population of 2,229. The median age was 42.4 years. 20.1% of residents were under the age of 18 and 17.7% of residents were 65 years of age or older. For every 100 females there were 98.3 males, and for every 100 females age 18 and over there were 95.7 males age 18 and over.

90.5% of residents lived in urban areas, while 9.5% lived in rural areas.

There were 891 households in Elwood, of which 28.4% had children under the age of 18 living in them. Of all households, 55.1% were married-couple households, 15.5% were households with a male householder and no spouse or partner present, and 21.5% were households with a female householder and no spouse or partner present. About 24.2% of all households were made up of individuals and 12.0% had someone living alone who was 65 years of age or older.

There were 920 housing units, of which 3.2% were vacant. The homeowner vacancy rate was 1.4% and the rental vacancy rate was 3.3%.

=== 2010 census ===
As of the 2010 United States census, there were 2,279 people, 880 households, and 630 families residing in the village. The racial makeup of the village was 94.9 percent White, 1.5 percent African American, 0.1 percent Native American, 0.5 percent Asian, 0.06 percent Pacific Islander, 2.2 percent from other races, and 0.8 percent from two or more races. Hispanics and Latinos of any race were 6.3 percent of the population.

Of the 880 households enumerated in the 2010 census, 35.2 percent had children under the age of 18 living within, 58.3 percent were husband-wife family living together, 9.2 percent had a female householder with no husband present, and 28.4 percent were non-families. 24.1 percent of all households were made up of individuals, and 28.4 percent had someone living alone who was 65 years of age or older. The average household size was 2.59 and the average family size was 3.08.

In the village, the age distribution of the population showed 25.5 percent under the age of 18 and 15.4 percent who were 65 years of age or older. The median age was 37.8 years. 50.8 percent of the populations was female while 49.8 percent was male.

The median income for a household in the village was $78,515 USD, and the median income for a family was $83,698. Males had a median income of $68,500 versus $38,299 for females. The per capita income for the village was $30,223. About 6.5 percent of families and 8.5 percent of the population were below the poverty line, including 12.2 percent of those under age 18 and 8.2 percent of those age 65 or over.

== Transportation ==
Pace provides bus service on Route 511 connecting Elwood to downtown Joliet and other destinations. There are proposals to extend Metra's Heritage corridor commuter rail service, which terminates in Joliet, to Braidwood, with a stop in Elwood.
