= Sexual orientation and gender identity in the Israeli military =

The Israeli military consists of the Israel Defense Forces and the Israel Border Police, both of which engage in combat to further the nation's goals. Israel's military is one of the most accommodating in the world for LGBT individuals. The country allows homosexual, bisexual, and any other non-heterosexual men and women to participate openly, without policy-based discrimination. Transgender men and women can serve under their identified gender and receive gender affirming surgery. No official military policy prevents intersex individuals from serving, though they may be rejected based on medical concerns.

== By demographics ==
=== Non-heterosexual personnel ===
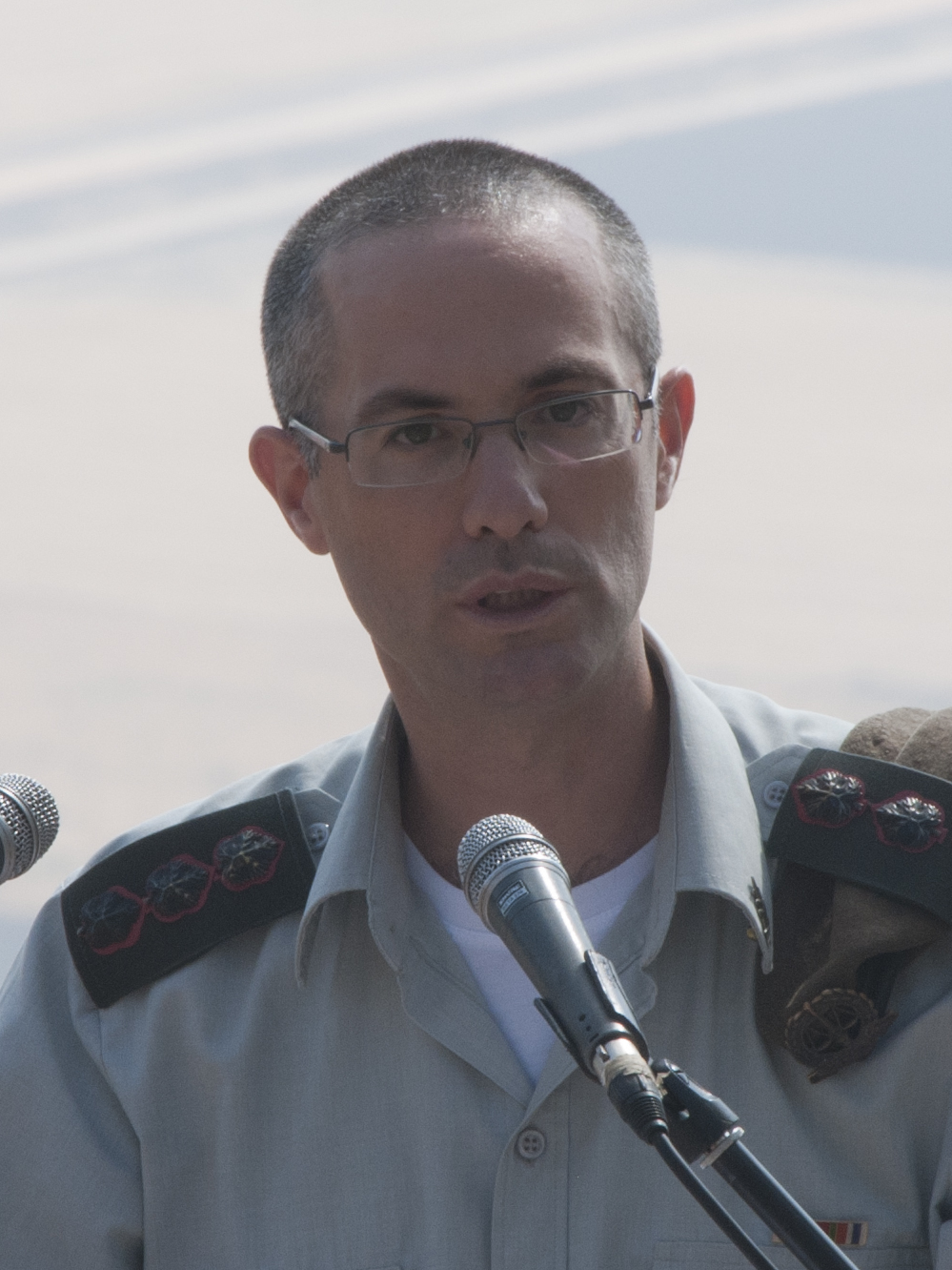
Aluf (General officer) Sharon Afek was the Chief Military Advocate General of the Israel Defense Forces, and is openly gay. He came out in 2017, becoming the first member of the supreme command of the IDF to do so.

Gay, lesbian, and bisexual soldiers serve throughout all branches of the military. Discrimination against LGBT soldiers in recruitment, placement, and promotion is prohibited. Harassment or degradation on the grounds of sexual orientation is also prohibited in the Israeli military. In 2016, the IDF banned a rabbi – also co-head of a premilitary academy – from visiting bases and called for him to retract statements calling gay people "perverts". A study conducted by Kaplan and Rosenmann in 2000 found that in terms of unit social cohesion, participants who acknowledged the presence of gay peers did not differ from those who had no such knowledge.

The military recognizes same-sex couples, including widows and widowers of the same sex. Life partners of non-heterosexual career soldiers are entitled to 14 weeks' paid maternity leave and an additional 12 weeks of unpaid leave (regardless of the biological father), unless the other partner has also taken leave. Like heterosexual partners, same-sex partners raising children together who are called up for reserve duty at the same time can ask for one partner's service to be postponed – whether their child or children are listed as in custody of one or both parents. Children of same-sex couples are eligible for scholarships and nursery school subsidies, even if the career soldier is not the biological parent. In terms of these rights for children of career soldiers, the IDF is more accommodating for same-sex couples than the state. A Gender Affairs unit works to empower the LGBT community in the IDF.

As of 2003, soldiers are also allowed to participate in gay pride parades. However, in 2018, the IDF banned soldiers from participating in strikes protesting the exclusion of gay men from a recently passed surrogacy law, as they were considered political demonstrations.

Acceptance in everyday life sometimes differs from regulations; a poll conducted in 2011 by the Israel Gay Youth found that 40% of gay soldiers said they were verbally harassed for their sexual orientation, 20% said they had been sexually harassed, and 4% said they had been physically assaulted. Some, such as Noa Halevi, a reserves officer, say that female gay soldiers have an easier time in the army's masculine environment. In 2019, an IDF spokesman supported the removal of drawings depicting various family structures – including same-sex couples and single parents – that had been posted to a base's bulletin board for Family Day, as the photos were not in "IDF Code of Ethics". However, in one instance, a soldier who overheard homophobic comments did report the behavior to his commanders, leading to the punishment of one of the instigating soldiers.

Some units are considered more accommodating, such as Unit 8200, a branch that often drafts from the socio-economic elite and deals with signals intelligence. However, its reputation as a gay-friendly unit is complicated by unit dissenters that objected to Unit 8200's collection of information on innocent people – including their sexuality – for later use as blackmail.

Among the public, the Peace Index poll found that a large majority of Israelis say the IDF should espouse a "pluralistic and open value system", including openness to LGBT soldiers. 81% of those who said they were "secular", 76% of "non-religious-traditional", 57% of "religious", and 52% of "religious-traditional" support such openness.

==== History of non-heterosexual personnel in the Israeli military ====
In 1956, the Military Court of Appeals heard the case of two male privates sentenced to a year in prison for consensual sex. The General Staff's orders did not mention homosexuality, but civilian law deemed "relations not in the usual way" a criminal offense. Psychologist Dr. Skali Avraham testified that homosexual behavior was deviant, not criminal. The court accepted the argument, and sentenced one soldier to a day in prison and the other, who was ruled to have instigated the encounter, to 70 days.

In the 1960s, legal opinions by the Israeli Attorney General and the Supreme Court limited the application of the criminal laws against homosexuality, but the prevailing notion that homosexuality was a disease remained. In 1977, the Military Advocate General, Brig. Gen. Zvi Inbar, issued a set of directives – "The Trying of Homosexual Soldiers" – to all military prosecutors, instructing them to only file charges against soldiers who broke the civilian law against homosexual acts if: one of the parties involved was a minor, the sex was non-consensual, one of the parties was unconscious, the sex was conducted in public, or one of the soldiers was under the command of the other.

In 1983, the IDF adopted a policy that gay personnel would not be limited or discharged solely based on their sexual orientation, but it did prohibit gay service members from taking intelligence positions, other jobs requiring a top-secret clearance, or serving in elite combat units. Officers were also required to refer known gay soldiers for a psychological evaluation to determine whether they posed any security risks or were mentally unfit for service, though commanders did sometimes disregard this policy.

Civilian law decriminalized homosexual acts in 1988.

In 1993, the IDF formally opened the draft to all, regardless of sexual orientation. In 1998, the army ceased to link sexual orientation to security clearances, and rescinded the order that required commanding officers to report gay soldiers. These policy changes were not well-publicized; a 2003 survey found that only 29% of gay soldier respondents were aware of the 1993 policy. Non-heterosexual personnel are currently allowed to serve openly in the military, including in special units.

=== Transgender personnel ===
The Israeli Defense Forces does not consider gender dysphoria to be a disqualifying condition for service. Furthermore, the IDF considers certain transition-specific medical treatments (hormone replacement therapy and gender-affirming surgery) and counseling to be medically essential for transgender personnel, and, thus, pays for said treatments. The IDF determines gender-specific army regulations (length of service, housing, uniforms, etc.) on a case-by-case basis. However, this is complicated by the fact that Israeli law only allows gender-affirming surgery to be performed once an individual is 18 – the draft age –; therefore, most individuals joining the IDF would not have the opportunity to transition before joining. Shachar Erez, the first openly transgender person to become an officer in the IDF, underwent gender-affirming surgery during his service. During his officers course, he decided to come out to his colleagues and commanders. He graduated as a male officer, and continues his service in the department of Behavioral Sciences of the ground forces.

==== History of transgender personnel in the Israeli military ====
While transgender individuals have been allowed to serve in the IDF, more recent policy changes have allowed these individuals to be treated in accordance with their preferred gender.

In 2013, the IDF announced that they would, for the first time, allow a transgender woman to serve in the army as a female soldier. The IDF Medical Corps' Mental Health Division then worked with the Israeli Center for Human Sexuality & Gender Identity to better understand the needs of transgender individuals and raise awareness of those needs within the IDF.

In 2014, a new policy was put in place that automatically referred transgender personnel to a support system – allowing them to avoid seeking a commander's help obtaining uniforms, health care, or proper facilities, and making it easier to serve as their preferred gender. Showers and housing may be handled on a case-by-case basis, while fitness standards for a given position must be met as applicable to their preferred gender. That year, Shachar Erez became the first openly transgender officer in the IDF.

=== Intersex personnel ===
Officially, IDF policy does not bar intersex persons from service, though intersex individuals may be found unfit or re-assigned due to related medical conditions.

Without conclusive data on intersex prevalence in Israel or reports regarding the military service of intersex individuals, a case study by Marom et al. (2008) estimates that there are a "few dozen" intersex individuals in active service in the IDF. They assume that the condition is likely under-reported in data of soldiers in service between 2004 and 2007, or some intersex individuals were ineligible for the draft due to gender dysphoria. In 2010, an intersex Haredi man was initially found to be fit for service in a combat supporting role. Upon his attempt to improve his profile to serve in combat roles, the army determined that he could not enlist at all due to his age – 30 – though the man himself believes this determination was due to his status as an intersex individual.

== By branch ==
=== Israel Defense Forces ===
In May 2019, the IDF made changes to recruitment forms, aimed at adjusting them to be inclusive of soldiers with same-sex parents. Where the form asked for the information of the "Father" and "Mother", it now asks for "Parent 1" and "Parent 2". The move was opposed by some Orthodox rabbis.

=== Israel Border Police ===
The Israel Border Police is a unit within the Israel Police, but is a combat-ready organ of the Israeli government. Israelis who are drafted for mandatory military service are allowed to choose to serve in the border police. As a part of the police force of Israel, discrimination against LGBT people is prohibited. A violation of these rules does not necessarily result in ejection from the service; in 2018, a police rabbi who made homophobic statements was allowed to keep his job with a warning.

== Gallery ==
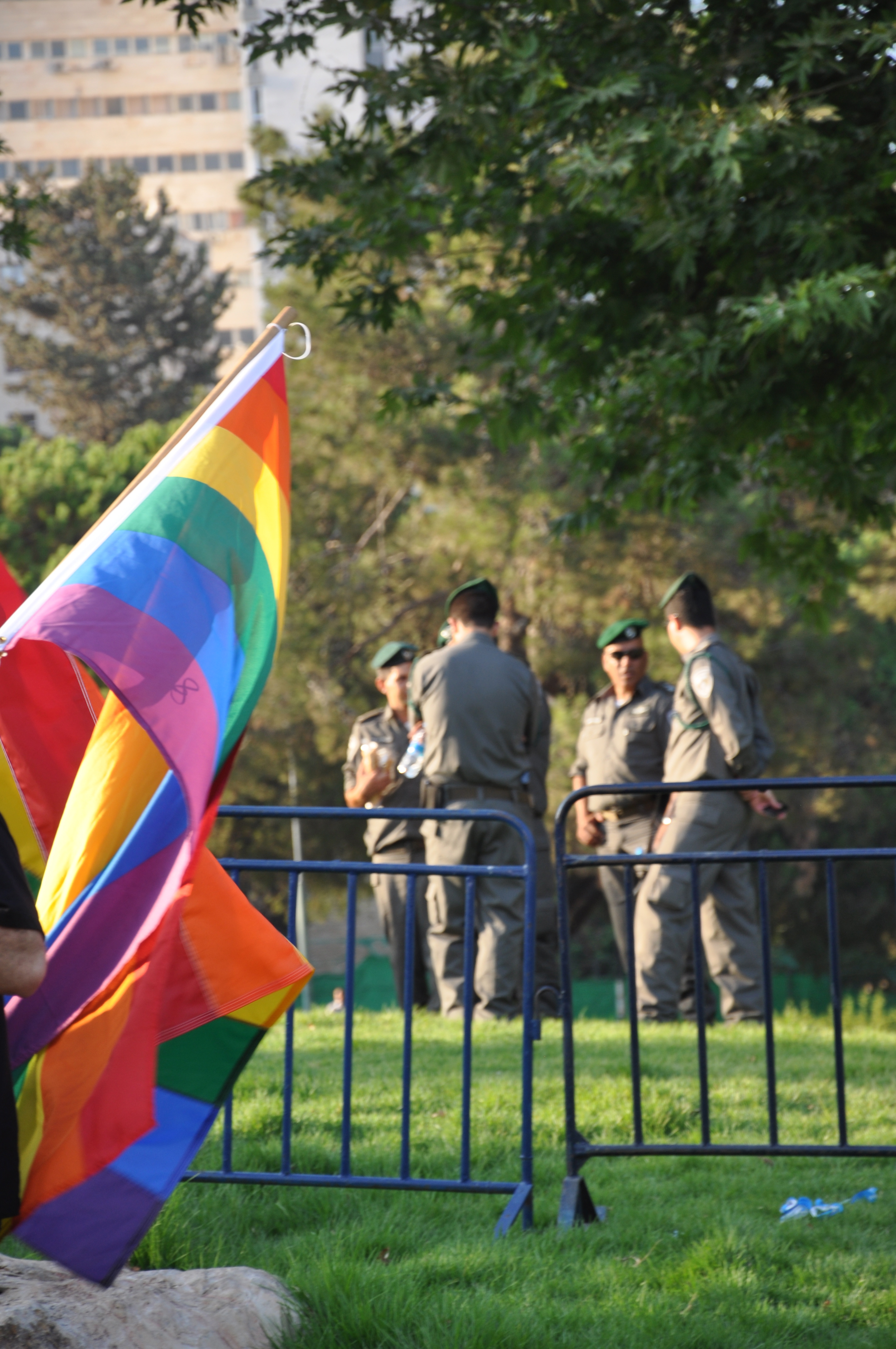
Some Israeli soldiers in uniform seen at Jerusalem Pride in 2012.

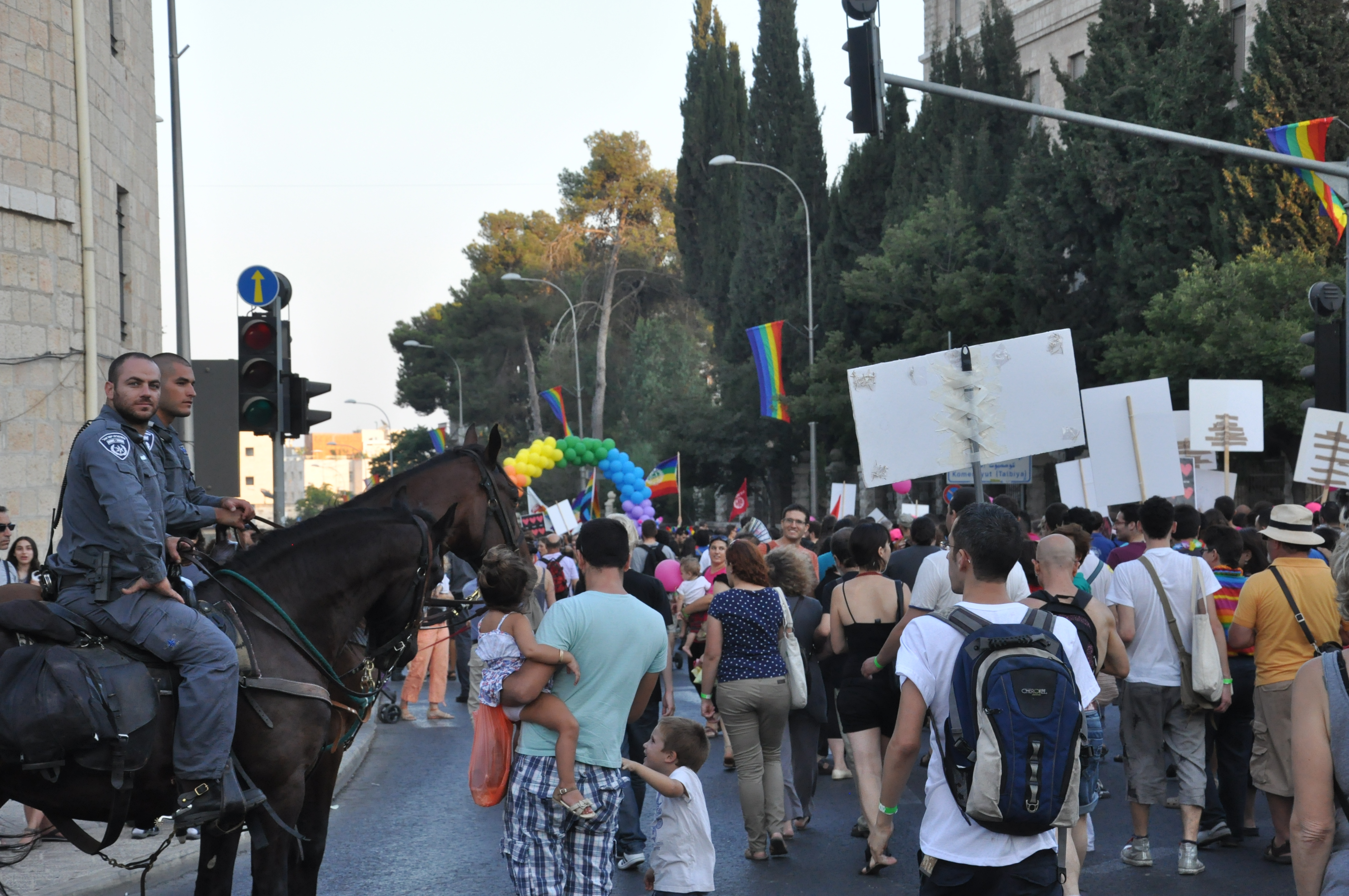
Some soldiers on horseback watching over the Jerusalem Pride Parade in 2012.

== See also ==
- Women in the Israel Defense Forces
- LGBT rights in Israel
- Sexual orientation and gender identity in military service
  - Sexual orientation and military service
  - Transgender people and military service
  - Intersex people and military service
- Shin Bet
- Mossad
