= Abraham Lincoln National Cemetery =

Veterans cemetery in Will County, Illinois

Coordinates: 41°23′30″N 88°07′49″W

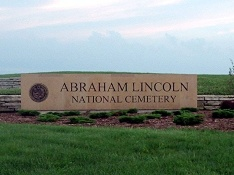
- Interactive map of Abraham Lincoln National Cemetery

Details
- Established: 1999
- Location: Elwood, Illinois
- Size: 982 acres (397 ha)

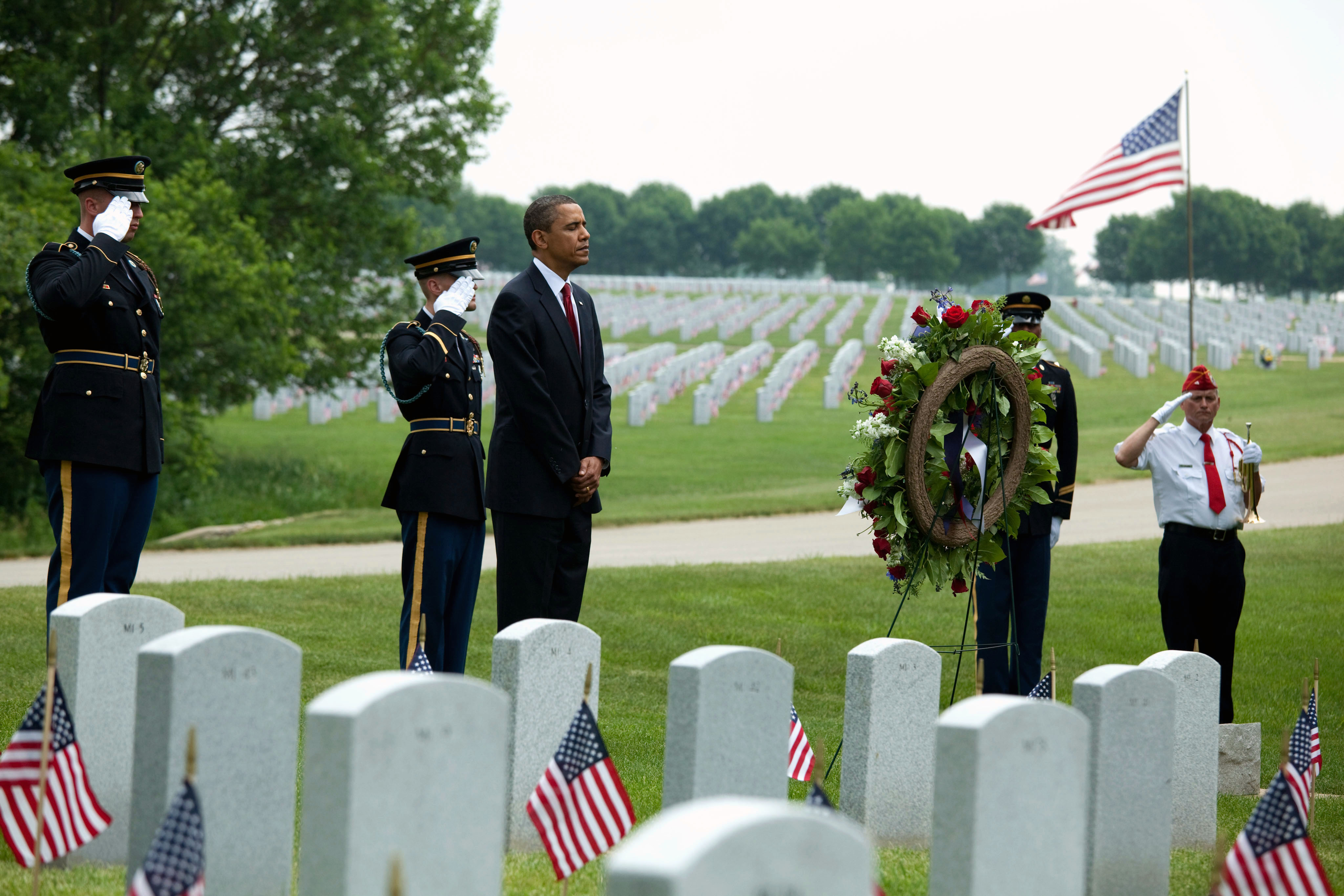
President Barack Obama on Memorial Day, May 31, 2010. (Official White House Photo by Pete Souza)

The Abraham Lincoln National Cemetery is an American military cemetery that covers 982 acres (397 ha) in Elwood, Illinois. It is located approximately 50 miles (80 km) southwest of Chicago, Illinois. When fully completed, it will provide 400,000 burial spaces.

The cemetery was dedicated in 1999 by the United States Department of Veterans Affairs National Cemetery Administration. It was the 117th national cemetery dedicated under the administration. The cemetery is on the grounds of the former Joliet Army Ammunition Plant site, which was formerly known as the Joliet Arsenal.

The cemetery is named after President Abraham Lincoln, the 16th President of the United States and founder of the National Cemetery system and who is buried at Oak Ridge Cemetery in Springfield, Illinois.

In 2015 the first American federally approved monument honoring LGBT veterans was dedicated at the cemetery.

== Notable burials ==
- Johnny Bach (1924–2016), professional basketball player and coach
- Johnny Carter (1934–2009), jazz vocalist
- Iceal Hambleton (1918–2004), USAF Vietnam War pilot
- Theodore Hyatt (1830–1900), recipient of the Medal of Honor for action in the Siege of Vicksburg
- Betty Madigan (1928–2020), singer and actress
- Mary L. Petty (1916–2001), 1st black woman captain in the US Army Nurse Corps
- George E. Sangmeister (1931–2007), US Representative
- Gus Savage (1925–2015), US Representative
