= CenterPoint Intermodal Center =

Intermodal freight terminal

Coordinates: 41°23′27″N 88°9′8″W

CenterPoint Intermodal Center is an intermodal freight terminal located in Elwood, Illinois, United States. It is the largest inland port in North America.

The Intermodal Center includes a 785-acre Union Pacific Railroad complex just south of Joliet and a 770-acre BNSF Railway complex further to the southwest. The facility's location was formerly part of the Joliet Army Ammunition Plant. Construction of the Intermodal Center began as part of the Joliet Arsenal redevelopment effort after 2000. The village of Elwood supported this with $150 million of TIF funding.

== Local concerns ==
As the freight traffic from Centerpoint grew, neighboring communities began to complain of safety, traffic and noise impacts. In 2014 the Village of Elwood attempted to enforce designated truck routes, but Centerpoint fought this in court.

Elwood has also sued Centerpoint regarding the use of their TIF funds, claiming that the project has generated less revenue and fewer jobs than promised. Mayor Bill Offerman explained, "Instead of a vibrant retail base, good-paying jobs and needed tax dollars that it promised, CenterPoint has given us a barrage of heavy truck traffic that puts residents in harm's way, low-paying warehouse jobs that make it impossible for middle-class families to live on and a mere fraction of the revenue it touted (the village) would receive in return."
