= Intersex people and military service =

Minority in military service

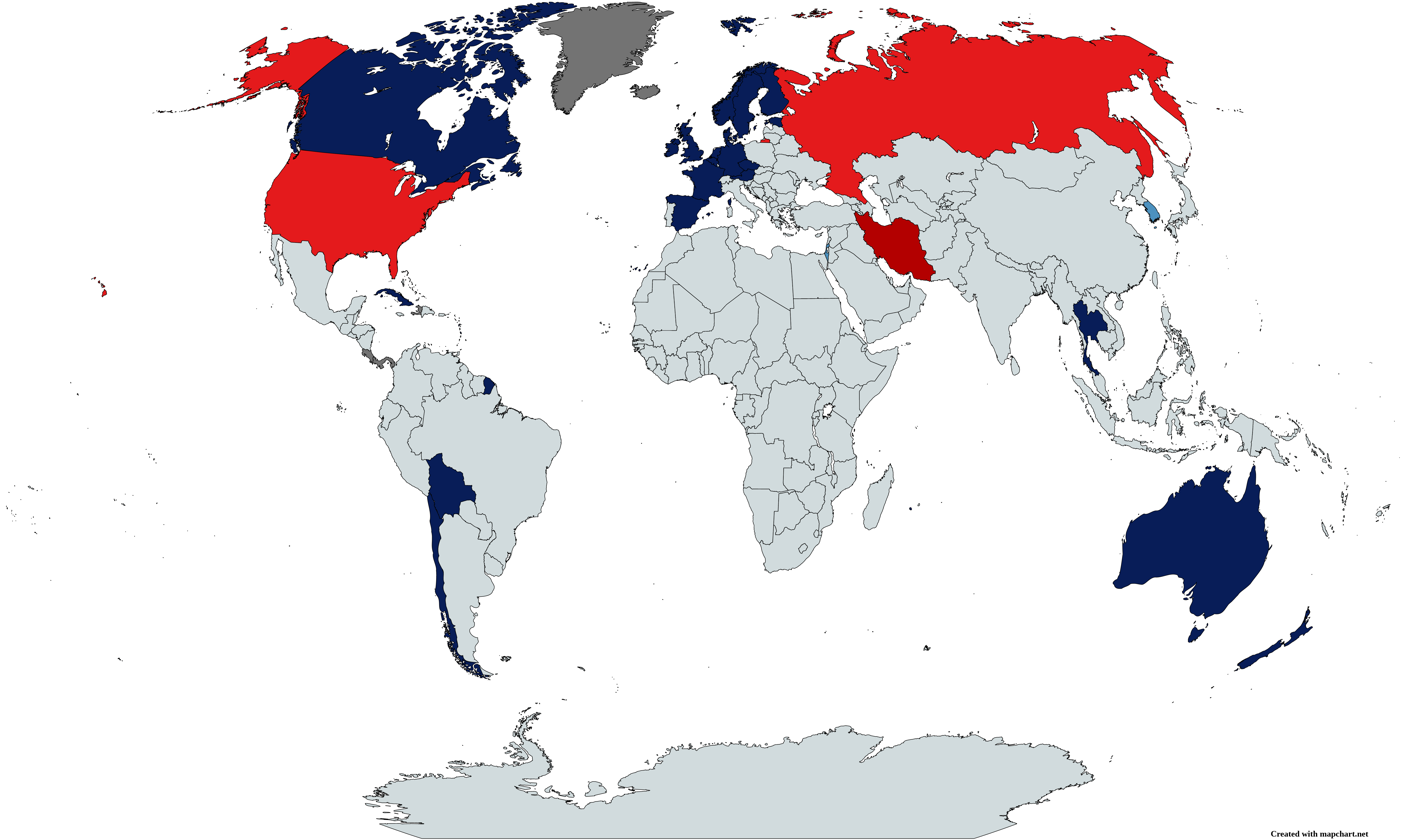
Intersex military service by country and territory Allows all intersex personnel to serve openly Allows most intersex personnel to serve with some exceptions and requirements Has blanket ban on most intersex personnel from serving, or bans those with genital differences from serving Allows intersex personnel to serve, but only after undergoing sterilization and intervention surgery Has no military

Military service of intersex people varies greatly by country. Some armed forces such as the Australian Defence Force fully embrace intersex people in the modern era, while others such as the United States Armed Forces have vague rules or policies or treat the subject on a case by case basis.

== History ==
In the late 1800s, military medical examinations became a driving force in increased detection and diagnosis of intersex individuals.

== Views ==
The 2014 book Operative Pediatric Surgery states that "societies that have accepted intersex individuals culturally may still have issues with whether or not to accept them in the military", this being due to the difficulties in determining where to place them as well as the complex medical issues they may pose. In 2007 the US-based Palm Center released a report that found that most of the militaries beliefs about transgender and intersex medical requirements were myths and posed no barrier to effective service.

== By country ==
=== United States ===
Acceptance of intersex people in the United States Armed Forces appears to vary depending on the nature of the individual's condition. Publications by the United States National Center for Biotechnology Information recommend that intersex individuals be allowed to serve in the armed forces, but not combat units. The Veterans Health Administration distinguishes between surgeries for transgender individuals and intersex persons. In 2015 this allowed intersex persons to receive medically necessary treatment that was prohibited for transgender people.

=== Israel ===
Officially, Israel Defense Forces policy does not prohibit intersex patients' draft but does exclude some people based on intersex status. The Military Medicine journal estimated in 2008 that there should be about "a few dozen" intersex persons serving in the Israel Defense Forces at that time, but that no records of intersex members could be found between 2005-2007. The report concludes that intersex service members are likely closeted and choose not to report their intersex status due to shame and secrecy. The 2008 report outlines the case of an intersex woman whose status was not discovered until a military medical investigation. She was initially drafted to a combat unit and served successfully, but was later transferred to a non-combat unit where she also completed her service successfully. It was discovered that her older sister, who served in a fully non-combat unit, was also intersex, as was their younger sister who was yet to be drafted.

=== Australia ===
A report from 2017 by ABC Online stated that intersex personnel of the Australian Defence Force (ADF), much like other queer people, have had their history and contributions largely scrubbed out, and that this history was still in the process of being rediscovered. During the "25 years of diversity" celebration for the armed forces intersex people were honored and included with other queer people. In their 2018 book Serving in Silence? Noah Riseman, Shirleene Robinson and Graham Willett acknowledged the lack of perspective and representation from intersex people in their work. They account for this gap by explaining that the Australian Defence Force never had official policies regarding intersex people and that it was purely considered a medical condition, and the nature of the specific condition would determine if someone was allowed to serve as either a man or a woman, and the fact that the one intersex person they were able to interview provided them with content which they felt was too sensitive to share. In 2016 the first ADF policy regarding intersex and non-binary people was put in use, stating that they are allowed to self-identify as "intersex", "indeterminate" or "unspecified" on their papers. Australia allows both non-binary trans people and intersex servicemen to use "X" on their papers as well.

DEFGLIS is the most well known organisation of the Regular, Reserve and Civilian members of the Australian Defence Organisation for those who are LGBTIQ+, as well as their allies.

=== South Korea ===
Intersex service people of the Republic of Korea Armed Forces are subject to supplemental urological examinations. This was first introduced due to transgender people but is also meant to clear up the status of intersex individuals to the military leaders. Non-intersex people can also be subject to them in some cases.

=== Taiwan ===
Taiwan's military is overwhelmingly male and only males are obligated to serve under conscription; this can cause complicated situations for intersex people. One noted case was in 1954 with the soldier Xie Jianshun who was assigned as a male at birth but was later discovered in the military to have many female characteristics. Xie had a penis, a very slim vaginal opening, and internal gonads which contained both testicular and ovarian tissue. Doctors determined that the ovarian tissue could still produce eggs and that Xie's testicular tissue was deteriorating. Military doctors performed four surgeries despite Xie's desire to remain a man. Afterwards Xie left the armed forces.

=== Thailand ===
In the past the exclusion or inclusion of intersex people presented a difficult task for the Royal Thai Armed Forces which have at times expected both cross-dressers and transgender people assigned male at birth to be eligible for drafting regardless of feminine traits. They were unsure how to handle intersex people since not all those with male traits were assigned male at birth. At present, they are mostly allowed.

=== Spain ===
In the 19th century, Spain excluded many androgynous people and those with ambiguous genitalia from military service, people who they described as being of "doubtful sex". If a male person was found to be developing breasts they could be excluded even if they had no visible genital abnormalities. The military composed several regulations to determine who was deemed unfit for service based on their genitals.

The modern-day Spanish Armed Forces accepts intersex personnel.

=== Vietnam ===
One of the most well known intersex military people is Lê Văn Duyệt. Born in 1763, he was considered a genius general and helped unify the area that is today known as Vietnam.

=== Czech Republic ===
The Armed Forces of the Czech Republic allows intersex recruits.

=== Canada ===
Intersex individuals are accepted in the Canadian Armed Forces.

=== New Zealand ===
The New Zealand Defence Force offers support to its intersex troops the same as to their other queer personnel. Intersex service members and veterans are supported by DEFGLIS, the Defence Force Lesbian Gay Bisexual Transgender and Intersex Information Service.

=== Japan ===
During the Taishō period (30 July 1912 to 25 December 1926) an intersex man who was initially assigned female at birth underwent sex reassignment surgery to masculinize his genitals and was allowed to be assessed for military service. He was rejected for not being tall enough but his intersex status was not commented on.

=== Iran ===
Since the first half of the 20th century, intersex people who were assigned male at birth and had surgery to correct any issues were allowed to serve, and intersex persons assigned female at birth could also serve if they choose to transition to male and have surgery.

=== Russia ===
According to the laws of the Russian Federation, only people with a male passport gender marker are eligible for drafting. Those with a female passport gender marker can serve in the army at will. However, there are a number of medical restrictions for which military service can be prohibited or restricted. These restrictions include those that may be manifestations of intersex traits, such as vaginal atresia, absence of the penis, cryptorchidism, and amenorrhea.

== See also ==
- Thomas(ine) Hall
- (DoDI) 6130.03, 2018, section 5, 13f and 14m
