= William Steinmetz =

- Born: September 2, 1847; Newport, Kentucky
- Died: June 10, 1903 (aged 55); Cincinnati, Ohio
- Burial place: Wesleyan Cemetery Cincinnati, Ohio
- Military career
- Allegiance: United States of America; Union
- Branch: United States Army; Union Army
- Rank: Corporal
- Units: Company G, 83rd Indiana Infantry
- Conflicts: American Civil War: Battle of Vicksburg
- Awards: Medal of Honor

William Steinmetz (September 2, 1847, in Newport, Kentucky – June 10, 1903) was a Union Army soldier during the American Civil War who received America's highest military decoration the Medal of Honor for his actions at the Battle of Vicksburg, Mississippi.

== Biography ==
William Steinmetz was born in Newport, Kentucky, on September 2, 1847. He was a Corporal in the American Civil War. He entered service at Sunman, Indiana, and he served in the Union Army in Company G, 83rd Indiana Infantry. He received the Medal of Honor for his actions on May 22, 1863, at Vicksburg, Mississippi. His citation reads "Gallantry in the charge of the "volunteer storming party."

The Vicksburg campaign was waged from March 29 to July 4, 1863. It included battles in west-central Mississippi at Port Gibson, Raymond, Jackson, Champion Hill, Big Black River and numerous smaller battle fields. On the morning of May 22, General Grant launched what he hoped would be a crushing assault against Vicksburg. In the fighting that followed, the Union Infantry was repulsed and thrown back along a three-mile front. The Union Army suffered more than 3,000 casualties, and 97 Union soldiers earned Medals of Honor (the second-largest single-day total in history.) Private William Steinmetz was one of eighty soldiers cited simply for "Gallantry in the charge of the 'volunteer storming party,' seemingly innocuous wording that actually denotes the fact that Private Steinmetz was at the head of his attacking force where the enemy fire was hottest and the danger the greatest. Steinmetz was one of ten 83rd Indiana soldiers to be awarded the Medal of Honor for bravery during the Civil War (the others being Private Clinton L. Armstrong, Private Thomas A. Blasdel, Private Emmer Bowen, Private William W. Chisman, Private John W. Conaway, Private Joseph Frantz, Private David H. Helms, Private Jacob H. Overturf, Private Reuben Smalley, and Private Frank Stolz).

Following the failed assault on May 22, a forty-seven-day siege was laid against the city, which finally surrendered to Union forces on July 4.

He died on June 10, 1903, and is buried in Wesleyan Cemetery in Cincinnati, Ohio.

== Medal of Honor citation ==

Rank and Organization
Private, Company G, 83d Indiana Infantry. Place and date: At Vicksburg, Miss., May 22, 1863. Entered service at: Sunmans, Ind. Birth: Newport, Ky. Date of issue: July 12, 1894.

Citation
Gallantry in the charge of the "volunteer storming party."

== See also ==
- List of American Civil War Medal of Honor recipients: Q–S
- Battle of Vicksburg
- 83rd Regiment Indiana Volunteer Infantry
