= Battle of Dallas order of battle: Union =

The following Union Army units and commanders fought in the Battle of Dallas on May 28, 1864 during the American Civil War.

== Abbreviations used ==
=== Military Rank ===
- MG = Major General
- BG = Brigadier General
- Col = Colonel
- Maj = Major
- Cpt = Captain

=== Other ===
- w = wounded
- k = killed

== Military Division of the Mississippi ==
MG William T. Sherman

=== Army of the Tennessee ===
MG James B. McPherson

==== XV Corps ====
MG John A. Logan

Division	Brigade	Regiments and Others
First Division; BG Peter J. Osterhaus	1st Brigade BG Charles R. Woods	26th Iowa; 30th Iowa; 27th Missouri; 76th Ohio
First Division; BG Peter J. Osterhaus	2nd Brigade Col James A. Williamson	4th Iowa; 9th Iowa; 25th Iowa; 31st Iowa
First Division; BG Peter J. Osterhaus	3rd Brigade Col Hugo Wangelin	3rd Missouri; 12th Missouri; 17th Missouri; 29th Missouri; 31st Missouri; 32nd Missouri
First Division; BG Peter J. Osterhaus	Artillery Maj Clemens Landgraeber	Battery F, 2nd Missouri Light; 4th Ohio Light Battery
Second Division; BG Morgan L. Smith	1st Brigade BG Giles A. Smith	55th Illinois; 111th Illinois; 116th Illinois; 127th Illinois; 6th Missouri; 8th Missouri; 57th Ohio
Second Division; BG Morgan L. Smith	2nd Brigade BG Joseph Lightburn	83rd Indiana; 30th Ohio; 37th Ohio; 47th Ohio; 53rd Ohio; 54th Ohio
Second Division; BG Morgan L. Smith	Artillery Cpt Frances DeGress	Battery A, 1st Illinois Light; Battery B, 1st Illinois Light; Battery H, 1st Illinois Light
Fourth Division; BG William Harrow	1st Brigade Col Reuben Williams	26th Illinois Infantry; 90th Illinois Infantry; 100th Illinois Infantry; 12th Indiana Infantry
Fourth Division; BG William Harrow	2nd Brigade Col Charles C. Walcutt	103rd Illinois Infantry; 97th Indiana Infantry; 6th Iowa Infantry; 46th Ohio Infantry
Fourth Division; BG William Harrow	3rd Brigade Col John M. Oliver	48th Illinois; 99th Indiana; 15th Michigan; 70th Ohio
Fourth Division; BG William Harrow	Artillery Cpt Henry H. Griffiths	Battery F, 1st Illinois Light Artillery; 1st Battery, Iowa Light Artillery

==== XVI Corps ====
MG Grenville M. Dodge

Division	Brigade	Regiments and Others
Second Division; BG Thomas W. Sweeny	1st Brigade BG Elliott W. Rice	52nd Illinois; 2nd Iowa; 7th Iowa
Second Division; BG Thomas W. Sweeny	2nd Brigade Col August Mersy	9th Illinois Mounted Infantry; 12th Illinois; 66th Illinois (Western Sharpshooters); 81st Ohio
Fourth Division; BG James C. Veatch	1st Brigade BG John W. Fuller	64th Illinois; 18th Missouri; 27th Ohio; 39th Ohio
Fourth Division; BG James C. Veatch	2nd Brigade BG John W. Sprague	35th New Jersey; 43rd Ohio; 63rd Ohio; 25th Wisconsin
Fourth Division; BG James C. Veatch	Artillery Cpt Jerome B. Burrows	Battery C, 1st Michigan Light; 14th Ohio Light Battery; Battery F, 2nd U.S.

==== Cavalry Corps ====
Division	Brigade	Regiments and Others
Second Division	3rd Brigade Col John T. Wilder	26th Iowa; 30th Iowa; 27th Missouri; 76th Ohio
Second Division	Artillery	Chicago Board of Trade Battery

== See also ==
- Atlanta Campaign Union order of battle
