= Oscar Slagle =

Private Oscar Slagle
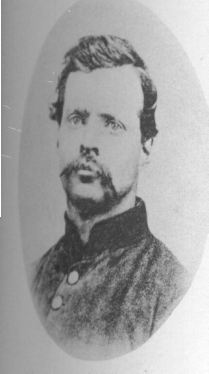
- Born: 2 April 1844; Fulton County, Ohio
- Died: 12 April 1913 (aged 69); Cullom, Livingston County, Illinois
- Burial place: Broughton Township Cemetery, Campus, Illinois
- Military career
- Allegiance: United States
- Branch: Army
- Service years: 1862–1865
- Rank: Corporal
- Units: Company D, 104th Illinois Infantry
- Conflicts: Battle of Elk River, Tennessee
- Awards: Medal of Honor

Oscar Slagle (2 April 1844 – 12 April 1913) was a private in the United States Army who was awarded the Medal of Honor for gallantry at the Battle of Elk River in Tennessee during the American Civil War.

== Personal life ==
Slagle was born on 2 April 1844 in Fulton County, Ohio. His city of residence was listed as Manlius, Illinois. He married Lucy Jane Zerby in 1869 and fathered 5 children. He died on 12 April 1913 in Cullom, Illinois and was buried in Broughton Township Cemetery in Kempton, Illinois. He was honored as a state Medal of Honor winner in 1999 by the 91st General Assembly of the State of Illinois.

== Military service ==
Slagle enlisted in the Army as a private on 4 August 1862 in Manlius and was mustered into Company D of the 104th Illinois Infantry on 27 August 1862. He was promoted to corporal at an unknown time. On 2 July 1863, at the Battle of Elk River, he was among a group of ten volunteers including leader George K. Marsh, Reuben Smalley, John Shapland, Charles Stacey, Richard J. Gage, and Samuel F. Holland, that successfully captured a Confederate defensive fortification while under heavy fire. All ten men would eventually win Medals of Honor. Slagle received his medal on 30 October 1897.

Slagle's Medal of Honor citation reads:

The President of the United States of America, in the name of Congress, takes pleasure in presenting the Medal of Honor to Private Oscar Slagle, United States Army, for extraordinary heroism on 2 July 1863, while serving with Company D, 104th Illinois Infantry, in action at Elk River, Tennessee. Private Slagle voluntarily joined a small party that, under a heavy fire, captured a stockade and saved the bridge.

— Russel A. Alger, Secretary of War

Slagle was mustered out of the Army on 6 June 1865 at Washington D.C.
