= Battle of Dallas order of battle =

The order of battle for the Battle of Dallas includes:

- Battle of Dallas order of battle: Confederate, a subset of the Atlanta campaign order of battle: First phase, Confederate
- Battle of Dallas order of battle: Union

== See also ==
- Atlanta campaign order of battle
