= Wesleyan Cemetery, Cincinnati =

Wesleyan Cemetery
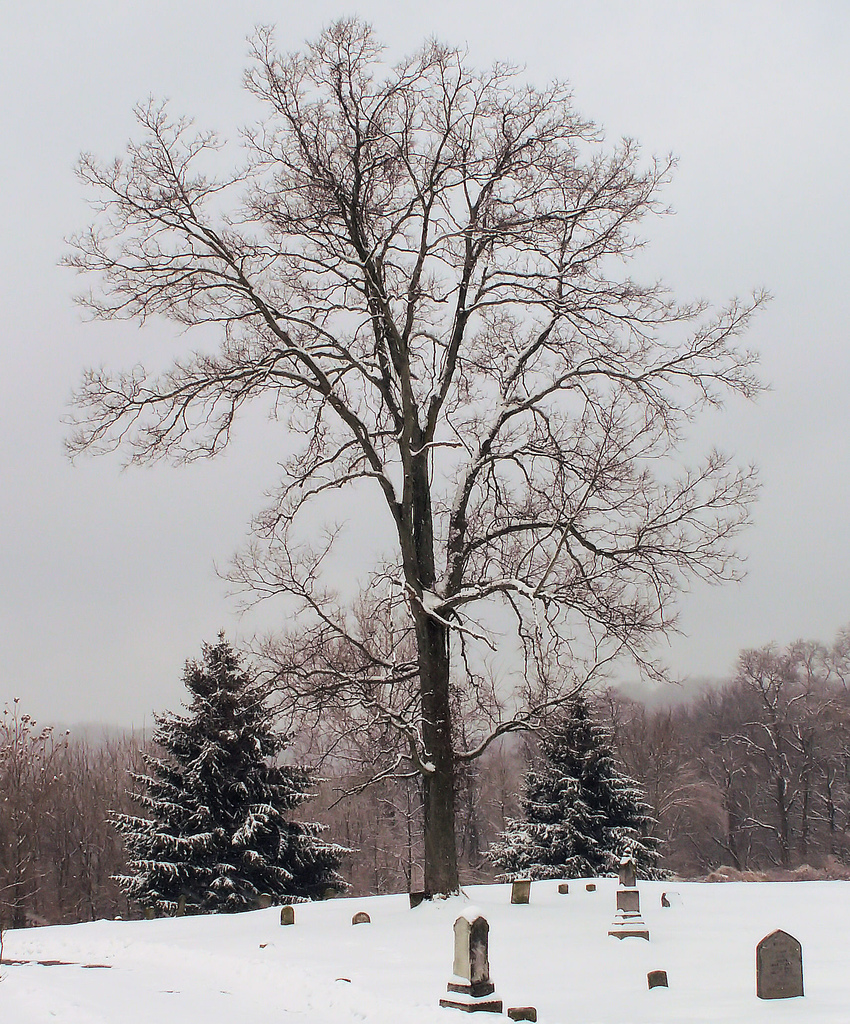
- Wesleyan cemetery in Ohio.

Details
- Established: 1843
- Location: 4003 Colerain Avenue, Cincinnati, Ohio 45223.
- Country: United States
- Coordinates: 39°09′36″N 84°32′49″W
- Owned by: Wesley Chapel
- Size: 24 acres
- Website: Wesleyan Cemetery Unofficial Website
- Find a Grave: Wesleyan Cemetery

Wesleyan Cemetery is a prominent cemetery in Cincinnati, Ohio. It is the oldest continuously operating cemetery in Hamilton County, Ohio.

== History ==
The cemetery was founded in 1843 by the Methodist Church when its old cemetery behind Wesley Chapel had become full. The church then bought approximately 25 acres (100,000 m^{2}) on Colerain Avenue adjacent to Mill Creek. Bodies from other cemeteries were moved there from downtown. Originally, the cemetery was located in Millcreek Township.

Wesleyan is an historic cemetery and the first cemetery in Cincinnati designed in a park-like fashion, with winding drives, trees, and shrubs. Spring Grove Cemetery, another historic Cincinnati cemetery of similar design, was founded two years later in 1845. Wesleyan Cemetery was also the first in the city to keep and maintain records of its burials and grounds, which it has done since its founding.

The cemetery once played a pivotal role in "The Escape of the 28", one of the largest and best documented runaway slave escapes in the history of the Underground Railroad, when an abolitionist farmer named John Fairfield led 28 fugitive slaves through the city of Cincinnati in the daytime. With the help of anti-slavery Underground Railroad agent Levi Coffin's plan to pose as a funeral procession, they marched themselves to the north end of the city into the cemetery, where they found shelter, and were later led to Coffin's safe house. They then made their journey across the border into Canada and to freedom.

In 1939 and 1941, the City of Cincinnati attempted to annex Wesleyan Cemetery, which was by then an enclave fully surrounded by the city. However, burial lot owners and relatives of people buried at the cemetery successfully defeated the annexation over fears that the city would run a street through the cemetery. In 1943, Millcreek Township's border was reduced to be coextensive to the cemetery. The remaining township could not function as a government because its only residents, the cemetery's superintendent and her young son, could not fill the three trustee positions required by state law; at the same time, she could not vote for annexation, because she did not own the cemetery property. Despite being in the middle of an urban area, the cemetery had no provisions for police or fire protection. The cemetery formally became a part of the City in 1953, although news articles refer to the cemetery as constituting nonfunctioning Millcreek Township as late as 1961.

During the 1990s and 2000s, the cemetery passed from one caretaker to another amid controversy about mismanagement. The cemetery grew unkempt and attracted prostitutes and drug dealers. Attorney General Jim Petro stepped in, obtaining a ruling in Common Pleas Court that removed the caretaker and declared Wesleyan a public cemetery. Cincinnati unsuccessfully fought in court to avoid taking over management of the cemetery.

== Notable graves ==
Veterans of every United States war are interred at Wesleyan Cemetery. It is the resting place of Richard Allison, the first resident physician of Cincinnati, who also held a rank in the military equivalent to Surgeon General from 1792 to 1796. Six additional Revolutionary War veterans are buried in the cemetery.

A section of the cemetery is devoted to soldiers of the American Civil War, in which Medal of Honor recipient William Steinmetz is buried. Steinmetz served as a corporal in the Union Army in Company G, 83rd Indiana Infantry, and was awarded the Medal of Honor for action on May 22, 1863, at Vicksburg, Mississippi. The citation on his gravestone reads "Gallantry in the charge of the "volunteer storming party."

John Halliday Patrick, colonel of the locally raised Fifth Ohio Volunteer Infantry Regiment, is located in Section B. He was in command of the regiment at Gettysburg, Pennsylvania, and was killed in battle at New Hope Church, Georgia, on May 25, 1864.

== Activities ==
In recent years, the cemetery has rarely held services for either Memorial Day or Veterans Day. The cemetery has also recently been the subject of several lawsuits, and has become known among locals for its dilapidated appearance. The city of Cincinnati has begun maintenance of the cemetery. Volunteers can be seen cleaning the grounds. There is clearly a resurgence of care. In 1992, visitors reported unearthed bones in discarded dirt piles at the cemetery, and claims were made that filled-plots were being resold.

In 2014, the National Park Service formally recognizes Wesleyan Cemetery's role in the audacious plight by naming it a Network to Freedom Landmark. The cemetery is located at 4003 Colerain Avenue, in Cincinnati, Ohio 45223.

== In the media ==
Wesleyan Cemetery was featured in a season 3 episode of Mysteries at the Monument in 2015 and tells the story of "The Escape of the 28" fugitive slaves.
