= Joseph Frantz =

Joseph Frantz may refer to:

- Joe Frantz (born 1976), cinematographer for the CKY video series
- Joseph Frantz (soldier) (1837–1913), Union Army soldier and Medal of Honor recipient
