= Richard Allison (military physician) =

American physician

Richard Allison (1757 – March 22, 1816) was Physician General of the United States Army, the position that later became Surgeon General, from 1792 to 1796. He was the first physician to set up a permanent practice in Cincinnati, Ohio.

== Early life ==
Allison was born near Goshen, New York in 1757.

== Career ==
During the American Revolutionary War, he served as a surgeon's mate in the Pennsylvania Line of the Continental Army from 1778 to 1783. In 1789, he served as Fort Washington's first physician and surgeon for the resident 300-man garrison, eleven families, and twenty-two single men on his own until 1793, when Dr. Joseph Strong of Connecticut became his assistant. After the reorganization of the United States Army in 1789, he was appointed as Surgeon General to Major General Anthony Wayne's Legion of the United States in 1792, becoming the senior American military physician in the Northwest Indian War, during which the Legion defeated the Northwestern Indian Confederacy at the Battle of Fallen Timbers. He became the ranking medical officer of the United States Army up to the time of his honorable discharge in 1796 after the Legion of the United States disbanded the same year.

After living for a few years on his farm on the east fork of the Little Miami River, he returned to the city in 1805, and continued to practice medicine until his death. Daniel Drake called him the "father of our local profession," and wrote of him that "though not profound in science, he was sagacious, unassuming, amiable and kind."

== Death and legacy ==
Dr. Allison practiced in Cincinnati nearly a quarter of a century. Allison died there after a short illness, he was the first physician to die in Cincinnati. He was buried in the Wesley Chapel Cemetery on Fifth Street. His body was later moved and now is buried in the Wesleyan Cemetery in Cincinnati.
