= John Shapland =

English-born soldier and veteran of the American Civil War

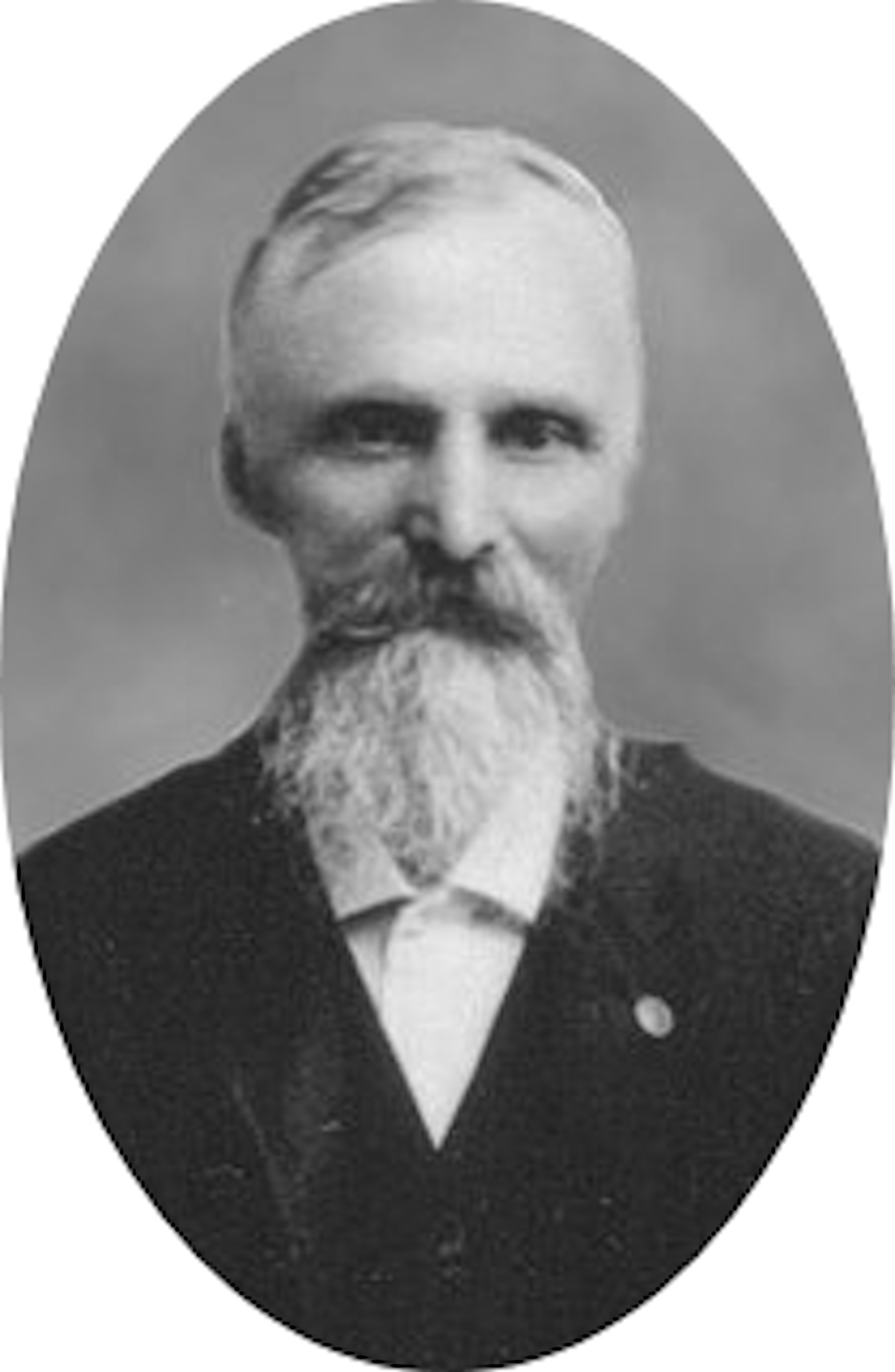
- Medal of Honor winner John Shapland 1913
- Born: March 4, 1832; Barnstaple, North Devon, England
- Died: February 5, 1923 (aged 90)
- Burial place: Greenwood Cemetery, York, Nebraska
- Military career
- Allegiance: United States of America
- Branch: United States Army; Union Army
- Rank: Private
- Unit: 104th Illinois Infantry Regiment
- Conflicts: Elk River, Tennessee
- Awards: Medal of Honor

John Shapland (March 4, 1832 – February 5, 1923) was an English soldier who fought for the Union Army of the United States during the American Civil War. He received the Medal of Honor for valor.

== Biography ==
Shapland served in the 104th Illinois Infantry Regiment. He received the Medal of Honor on October 30, 1897 for his actions at Elk River, Tennessee on July 2, 1863.

== Medal of Honor citation ==
Citation:

Voluntarily joined a small party that, under a heavy fire, captured a stockade and saved the bridge."

== See also ==
- List of American Civil War Medal of Honor recipients: Q-S
