= Wesley Chapel (Cincinnati) =

- Wesley Chapel
- Location: Cincinnati, Ohio, USA
- Denomination: Methodist
- Website: N/A

Architecture
- Years built: 1831
- Demolished: 1972 (at previous address)

Specifications
- Capacity: 1200

Wesley Chapel was a Methodist church in Cincinnati, Ohio, United States. Built in 1831 on the north side of Fifth Street between Broadway and Sycamore (39°06′08″N 84°30′27″W), it was a simple red brick Georgian structure copied after John Wesley's original Methodist church in London. With 1,200 seats, it was the largest meeting place west of the Alleghenies and the largest building in Cincinnati for many years. It was the seat of Methodism in Cincinnati.

The funeral of William Henry Harrison took place there in 1841.

In 1845, former president John Quincy Adams spoke at Wesley Chapel, dedicating the new Cincinnati Observatory being built on Mount Adams. In the years before the Civil War, political rallies and anti-slavery meetings frequently were held there.

During the early years, a cemetery was near the Chapel on Fifth Street; when the Wesleyan Cemetery, was founded in 1843 many of the bodies were moved to the new cemetery.

A long struggle took place between 1965 and 1972 between the Procter & Gamble Corporation and the people who wanted to save the oldest surviving church in the city, Wesley Chapel. P & G offered several options, including moving the building across the street. The congregation elected to build a new church in the Over-the-Rhine neighborhood. Wesley Chapel was demolished in 1972.

The new Wesley Chapel is located at 80 East McMicken Avenue (39°06′55″N 84°30′53″W).
