= 104th Illinois Infantry Regiment =

104th Regiment Illinois Volunteer Infantry
- Active: August 27, 1862, to July 11, 1865
- Country: United States
- Allegiance: Union
- Branch: Infantry
- Engagements: Battle of Hartsville; Tullahoma Campaign; Battle of Chickamauga; Siege of Chattanooga; Battle of Lookout Mountain; Battle of Missionary Ridge; Atlanta campaign Battle of Resaca; Battle of New Hope Church; Battle of Dallas; Battle of Allatoona; Battle of Pickett's Mill; Battle of Kennesaw Mountain; Battle of Peachtree Creek; Siege of Atlanta; Battle of Jonesborough; Sherman's March to the Sea; Carolinas campaign Battle of Bentonville

The 104th Illinois Volunteer Infantry was an infantry regiment in the Union Army during the American Civil War.

== Service ==
The American flag flown over the regiment's recruiting center

The 104th Illinois Infantry was organized at Ottawa, Illinois, and mustered in for three years service on August 27, 1862.

The regiment was attached to 39th Brigade, 12th Division, Army of the Ohio, to November 1862. District of Western Kentucky, Department of the Ohio, to December 1862. Prisoners of war to April 1863. 1st Brigade, 2nd Division, XIV Corps, Army of the Cumberland, to October 1863. 1st Brigade, 1st Division, XIV Corps, to June 1865.

The 104th Illinois Infantry mustered out of service June 6, 1865, and was discharged July 11, 1865, at Chicago, Illinois.

== Detailed service ==
Ordered to Louisville, Ky. Moved from Louisville to Frankfort, Ky., September 1862, and duty there until October 25. Moved to Hartsville, Tenn., October 26-December 1. Action at Hartsville December 7. Regiment captured and paroled. Sent to Camp Douglas, Chicago, Ill., and duty there as paroled prisoners of war until April 1863, when declared exchanged. Ordered to Brentwood, Tenn., then to Murfreesboro, Tenn., and duty there until June. Tullahoma Campaign June 24-July 7. Elk River July 3. Occupation of Middle Tennessee until August 16. Passage of the Cumberland Mountains and Tennessee River and Chickamauga Campaign August 16-September 22. Davis Cross Roads, near Dug Gap, September 11. Battle of Chickamauga September 19–21. Rossville Gap September 21. Siege of Chattanooga, Tenn., September 24-November 23. Chattanooga-Ringgold Campaign November 23–27. Lookout Mountain November 24. Missionary Ridge November 25. Pea Vine Valley and Graysville November 26. Taylor's Ridge, Ringgold Gap, November 27. At Chattanooga until February 1864. Moved to Nashville, Tenn., February 10, and duty there until March 15. Moved to Chattanooga March 15–19. Atlanta Campaign May 1-September 8. Demonstration of Rocky Faced Ridge May 8–11. Buzzard's Roost Gap May 8–9. Near Resaca May 13. Battle of Resaca May 14–15. Advance on Dallas May 18–25. Operations on line of Pumpkin Vine Creek and battles about Dallas, New Hope Church, and Allatoona Hills May 25-June 5. Pickett's Mills May 27. Operations about Marietta and against Kennesaw Mountain June 10-July 2. Pine Mountain June 11–14. Lost Mountain June 15–17. Assault on Kennesaw June 27. Ruff's Station, Smyrna Camp Ground, July 4. Chattahoochie River July 5–18, Peachtree Creek July 19–20. Siege of Atlanta July 22-August 25. Utoy Creek August 5–7. Flank movement on Jonesboro August 25–30. Near Red Oak August 29. Battle of Jonesboro August 31-September 1. Operations against Hood in northern Georgia and northern Alabama September 29-November 3. March to the Sea November 15-December 10. Siege of Savannah December 10–21. Carolinas Campaign January to April 1865. Near Stroud's Mills, S.C., February 26. Cloud's House February 26. Near Rocky Mount February 28. Averysboro, Taylor's Hole Creek, N.C., March 16. Battle of Bentonville March 19–21. Occupation of Goldsboro March 24. Advance on Raleigh April 10–14. Occupation of Raleigh April 14. Bennett's House April 26. Surrender of Johnston and his army. March to Washington, D.C., via Richmond, Va., April 29-May 19. Grand Review of the Armies May 24.

== Casualties ==
The regiment lost a total of 194 men during service; 6 officers and 110 enlisted men killed or mortally wounded, 2 officers and 76 enlisted men died of disease.

== Commanders ==
- Lieutenant Colonel Douglas Hapeman - commanded during the siege of Chattanooga and the battles of Chickamauga and Peachtree Creek
- Major John H. Widmer - commanded during the Carolinas Campaign

== Notable members ==
- Private Richard Gage, Company H - Medal of Honor recipient for action at a stockade on Elk River, Tennessee
- Corporal Lemuel F. Holland, Company D - Medal of Honor recipient for action at a stockade on Elk River, Tennessee
- Corporal Oscar Slagle Company D - Medal of Honor recipient for action at a stockade on Elk River, Tennessee

== See also ==
- List of Illinois Civil War units
- Illinois in the Civil War
