= 30th Iowa Infantry Regiment =

- Iowa state flag
- Active: September 20, 1862, to June 5, 1865
- Country: United States
- Allegiance: Union
- Branch: Infantry
- Engagements: Battle of Chickasaw Bayou; Battle of Arkansas Post; Siege of Vicksburg; Battle of Lookout Mountain; Battle of Missionary Ridge; Battle of Ringgold Gap; Battle of Resaca; Battle of Dallas; Battle of Kennesaw Mountain; Battle of Atlanta; Battle of Jonesboro; Battle of Griswoldville; March to the Sea; Battle of Bentonville

The 30th Iowa Infantry Regiment was an infantry regiment that served in the Union Army during the American Civil War.

== Service ==
The 30th Iowa Infantry was organized at Keokuk, Iowa and mustered in for three years of Federal service on September 20, 1862.

The regiment was mustered out on June 5, 1865.

== Total strength and casualties ==
A total of 1132 men served in the 30th Iowa at one time or another during its existence. It suffered 8 officers and 65 enlisted men who were killed in action or who died of their wounds and 3 officers and 241 enlisted men who died of disease, for a total of 317 fatalities.

== Commanders ==
- Colonel Charles H. Abbott
- Colonel William M. G. Torrence

== See also ==
- List of Iowa Civil War Units
- Iowa in the American Civil War
