= 127th Illinois Infantry Regiment =

127th Regiment Illinois Volunteer Infantry
- Active: September 6, 1862 - June 17, 1865
- Allegiance: United States Army Union Army
- Branch: Infantry
- Engagements: Yazoo Pass Expedition; Battle of Chickasaw Bayou; Battle of Arkansas Post; Battle of Champion Hill; Siege of Vicksburg- May 19 & May 22 assaults; Chattanooga Campaign; Battle of Missionary Ridge; Atlanta campaign; Battle of Resaca; Battle of Dallas; Battle of New Hope Church; Battle of Allatoona; Battle of Kennesaw Mountain; Battle of Atlanta; Siege of Atlanta; Battle of Jonesboro; Battle of Lovejoy's Station; Sherman's March to the Sea; Carolinas campaign; Battle of Bentonville

The 127th Regiment, Illinois Volunteer Infantry was an infantry regiment in the Union Army during the American Civil War.

== Service ==
The 127th Illinois Infantry was organized at Camp Douglas in Chicago, Illinois, and mustered in for three years service on September 6, 1862, under the command of Colonel John Van Arman.

The regiment was attached to 4th Brigade, 5th Division, District of Memphis, XIII Corps, Department of the Tennessee, November 1862. 2nd Brigade, 2nd Division, XIII Corps, to December 1862. 2nd Brigade, 2nd Division, Sherman's Yazoo Expedition, to January 1863. 2nd Brigade, 2nd Division, XV Corps, Army of the Tennessee, to September 1863. 1st Brigade, 2nd Division, XV Corps, to June 1865.

The 127th Illinois Infantry mustered out of service June 4, 1865, and was discharged at Chicago on June 17, 1865.

== Detailed service ==
Moved to Memphis, Tennessee, November 9–13, 1862. Duty at Camp Douglas, Illinois, guarding prisoners, September 6 to November 9, 1862. Grant's Mississippi Central Campaign. "Tallahatchie March" November 26-December 13. Sherman's Yazoo Expedition December 20, 1862 to January 3, 1863. Chickasaw Bayou December 26–28, 1862. Chickasaw Bluff December 29. McClernand's Expedition to Arkansas Post, Arkansas, January 3–10, 1863. Assault and capture of Fort Hindman, Arkansas Post, January 10–11. Moved to Young's Point, Louisiana, January 22, and duty there until March. Expedition to Rolling Fork, via Muddy. Steele's and Black Bayous and Deer Creek March 14–27. Deer Creek March 22. Demonstrations on Haines' and Drumgould's Bluffs April 29-May 2. Movement to Jackson, Mississippi, via Grand Gulf, May 2–14. Jackson May 14, Champion Hill May 16. Siege of Vicksburg, Mississippi, May 18-July 4. Assaults on Vicksburg May 19 and 22. Surrender of Vicksburg July 4. Advance on Jackson, Mississippi, July 4–10. Siege of Jackson July 10–17. At Big Black until September 22. Moved to Memphis, Tennessee; then marched to Chattanooga, Tennessee, September 22-November 20. Operations on Memphis & Charleston Railroad in Alabama October 20–29. Bear Creek, Tuscumbia, Alabama, October 27. Chattanooga-Ringgold Campaign November 23–27. Foot of Missionary Ridge November 24. Tunnel Hill November 24–25. Missionary Ridge November 26. Pursuit to Graysville November 26–27. March to relief of Knoxville November 28-December 8. At Larkinsville, Alabama, until May 1864. Atlanta Campaign May to September. Demonstration on Resaca May 8–13. Battle of Resaca May 14–15. Movement on Dallas May 18–25. Operations on line of Pumpkin Vine Creek and battles about Dallas, New Hope Church, and Allatoona Hills May 25-June 5. Operations about Marietta and against Kennesaw Mountain June 10-July 2. Assault on Kennesaw June 27. Nickajack Creek July 2–5. Chattahoochie River July 6–17. Battle of Atlanta July 22. Siege of Atlanta July 22-August 25. Ezra Chapel, Hood's second sortie, July 28. Flank movement on Jonesboro August 25–30. Battle of Jonesboro August 31-September 1. Lovejoy's Station September 2–6. Operations against Hood in northern Georgia and northern Alabama September 29-November 3. March to the Sea November 15-December 10. Clinton November 23. Siege of Savannah December 10–21. Assault and capture of Fort McAllister December 13. Campaign of the Carolinas January to April 1865. Salkehatchie Swamps, South Carolina, February 2–5. South Edisto River February 9. North Edisto River February 12–13. Columbia February 16–17. Battle of Bentonville, North Carolina, March 20–21. Occupation of Goldsboro March 24. Advance on Raleigh April 10–14. Occupation of Raleigh April 14. Bennett's House April 26. Surrender of Johnston and his army. March to Washington, D.C., via Richmond, Virginia, April 29-May 19. Grand Review of the Armies May 24.

== Casualties ==
The regiment lost a total of 218 men during service; 2 officers and 47 enlisted men killed or mortally wounded, 1 officer and 168 enlisted men died of disease.

== Commanders ==
- Colonel John Van Arman - resigned February 23, 1863
- Colonel Hamilton N. Eldridge - resigned July 29, 1863
- Lieutenant Colonel Frank S. Curtiss - commanded the regiment at rank until muster out

== Notable members ==
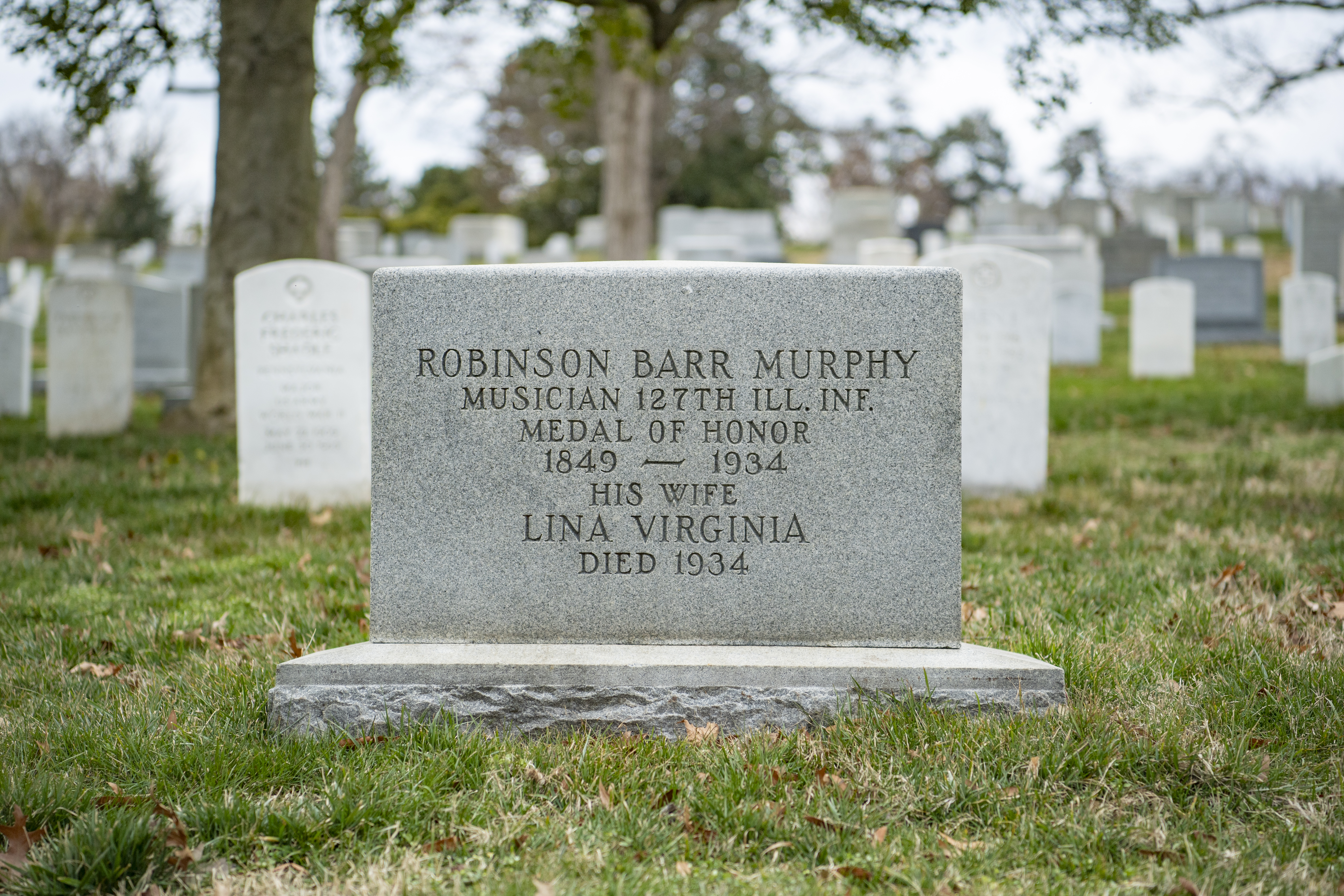
Grave of child soldier Robinson Barr Murphy, Medal of Honor recipient, at Arlington National Cemetery

- Private Emmer Bowen, Company C - Medal of Honor recipient for action at Vicksburg, May 22, 1863
- Private Andrew E. Goldsbery, Company E - Medal of Honor recipient for action at Vicksburg, May 22, 1863
- Corporal Joseph Lee Heywood, Company B - acting cashier at the First National Bank of Northfield, Minnesota, who successfully foiled the James-Younger Gang's attempt to rob the bank
- 1st Sergeant Theodore Hyatt, Company D - Medal of Honor recipient for action at Vicksburg, May 22, 1863
- Private Andrew McCornack, Company I - Medal of Honor recipient for action at Vicksburg, May 22, 1863
- Sergeant William Toomer, Company G - Medal of Honor recipient for action at Vicksburg, May 22, 1863

== See also ==
- List of Illinois Civil War units
- Illinois in the Civil War
