= Lemuel F. Holland =

American Civil War Medal of Honor recipient (1840–1914)

- Born: July 28, 1840; Burlington, Ohio
- Died: January 13, 1914 (aged 73)
- Burial place: Decatur, Illinois
- Military career
- Allegiance: United States
- Branch: United States Army; Union Army
- Rank: Sergeant
- Units: Company D, 104th Illinois Volunteer Infantry Regiment
- Conflicts: American Civil War
- Awards: Medal of Honor

Lemuel F. Holland (July 28, 1840 – January 13, 1914) was a Union Army soldier in the American Civil War who received the U.S. military's highest decoration, the Medal of Honor.

Holland was born in Burlington, Ohio on July 28, 1840, and entered service at LaSalle County, Illinois. He was awarded the Medal of Honor, for extraordinary heroism on July 2, 1863, while serving as a corporal with Company D, 104th Illinois Volunteer Infantry Regiment, at Elk River, Tennessee. His Medal of Honor was issued on October 30, 1897.

He died at the age of 73, on January 13, 1914, and was buried at the Greenwood Cemetery in Decatur, Illinois.

== Medal of Honor citation ==
The President of the United States of America, in the name of Congress, takes pleasure in presenting the Medal of Honor to Corporal Lemuel F. Holland, United States Army, for extraordinary heroism on 2 July 1863, while serving with Company D, 104th Illinois Infantry, in action at Elk River, Tennessee. Corporal Holland voluntarily joined a small party that, under a heavy fire, captured a stockade and saved the bridge.
