= Frank Stolz =

Private Frank Stolz
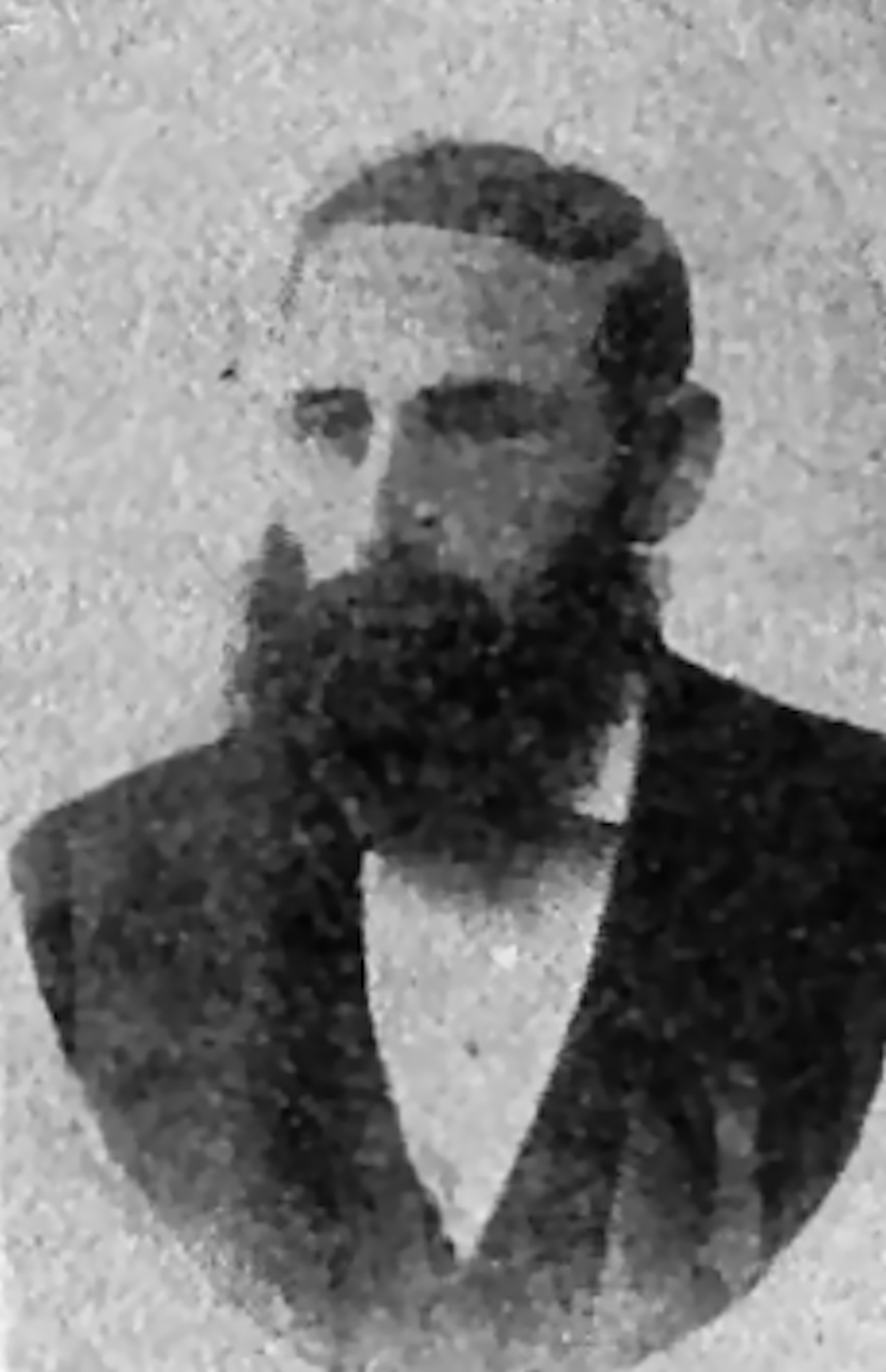
- Born: July 20, 1844; Dearborn County, Indiana, US
- Died: 19 November 1926 (aged 82); Center Township, Indiana, US
- Burial place: Holy Cross and Saint Joseph Cemetery, Indianapolis, Indiana
- Military career
- Allegiance: United States (Union)
- Branch: Army
- Service years: 1862–1865
- Rank: Private
- Units: Company G, 83rd Indiana Infantry
- Conflicts: Battle of Vicksburg
- Awards: Medal of Honor

Frank Stolz (July 20, 1844 – November 19, 1926) was a private in the United States Army who was awarded the Medal of Honor for gallantry during the American Civil War. He was awarded the medal on July 9, 1894, for actions performed during the Battle of Vicksburg in 1863.

== Personal life ==
Stolz was born in Dearborn County, Indiana, on July 20, 1844. He married Anna Wagner in 1870 and fathered 3 children. He died on November 19, 1926, in Center Township, Indiana and was buried in Holy Cross and Saint Joseph Cemetery in Indianapolis.

== Military service ==
Stolz enlisted in the Army as a private in Sunman, Indiana, on August 17, 1862. He was assigned to G Company of the 83rd Indiana Infantry. On May 22, 1863, at the Battle of Vicksburg, Stolz was a member of a volunteer storming party attacking Confederate lines near the town. For this action, he was awarded the Medal of Honor with the citation:

The President of the United States of America, in the name of Congress, takes pleasure in presenting the Medal of Honor to Private Frank Stolz, United States Army, for gallantry in the charge of the volunteer storming party on 22 May 1863, while serving with Company G, 83d Indiana Infantry, in action at Vicksburg, Mississippi.

— D. S. Lamont, Secretary of War

Stolz was mustered out of service on June 2, 1865, in Washington, D.C. His Medal of Honor is attributed to Indiana.
