= William Toomer =

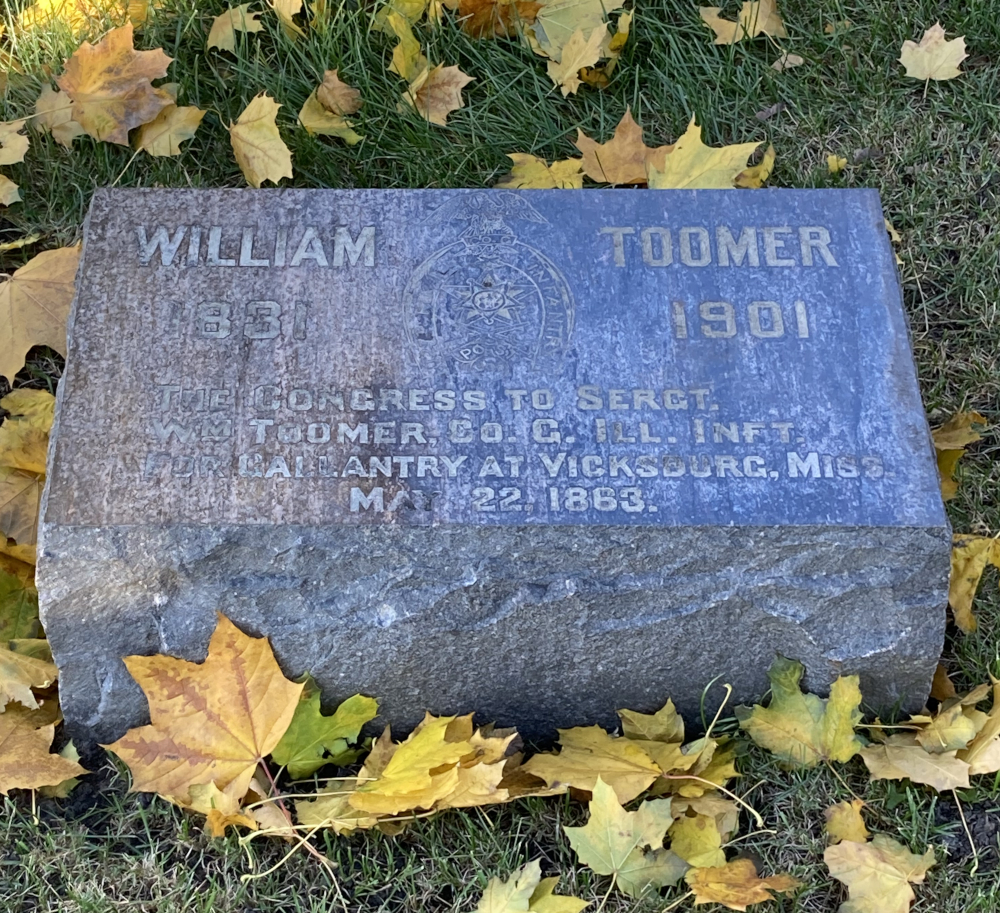
- Grave at Graceland Cemetery, Chicago
- Born: January 12, 1831; Dublin, Ireland
- Died: December 27, 1901 (aged 70); Illinois, US
- Burial place: Graceland Cemetery, Chicago, Illinois
- Military career
- Allegiance: United States of America
- Branch: United States Army
- Service years: 1862 - 1865
- Rank: First Sergeant
- Unit: 127th Illinois Volunteer Infantry Regiment
- Conflicts: Battle of Vicksburg; American Civil War
- Awards: Medal of Honor

William Toomer (January 12, 1831 – December 27, 1901) was an American soldier who fought in the American Civil War. Tommer received his country's highest award for bravery during combat, the Medal of Honor. Toomer's medal was won for his gallantry at the Battle of Vicksburg, Mississippi on May 22, 1863. He was honored with the award on July 9, 1894.

Toomer was born in Dublin, Ireland. He joined the US Army from Chicago in August 1862, and mustered out with his regiment in June 1865.

== Medal of Honor citation ==
The President of the United States of America, in the name of Congress, takes pleasure in presenting the Medal of Honor to Sergeant William Toomer, United States Army, for gallantry in the charge of the volunteer storming party on 22 May 1863, while serving with Company G, 127th Illinois Infantry, in action at Vicksburg, Mississippi.

== See also ==
- List of American Civil War Medal of Honor recipients: T–Z
