= Andrew McCornack =

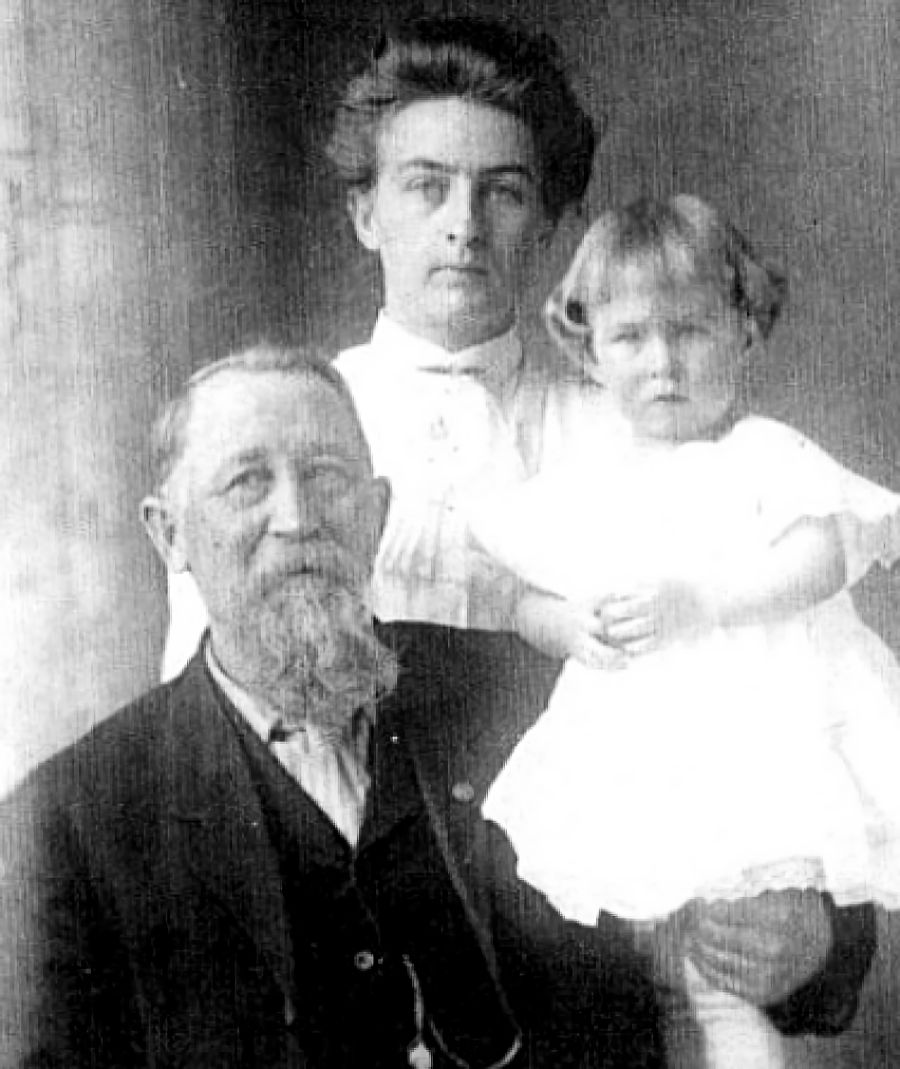
- Born: February 4, 1844; Elgin, Illinois, US
- Died: April 5, 1920 (aged 76); Monticello, Minnesota, US
- Military career
- Allegiance: United States; Union
- Branch: United States Army; Union Army
- Service years: 1862–1865
- Rank: Private
- Units: Company I, 127th Illinois Volunteer Infantry Regiment
- Conflicts: American Civil War • Siege of Vicksburg
- Awards: Medal of Honor

Andrew McCornack (February 4, 1844 – April 5, 1920) was a Union Army soldier during the American Civil War. He received the Medal of Honor for gallantry during the Siege of Vicksburg on May 22, 1863.

Born in Elgin, Illinois into a family with six sisters, he grew up in Kane County.

McCornack enlisted in Company I, (Note: This company was recruited from Kane County. He enlisted alongside two possible relatives, Andrew W. and William F. McCVornack.) 127th Illinois Infantry, on August 22, 1862, was sworn into federal service on September 5, 1862 and was mustered out as a Sergeant on June 5, 1865.

== Union assault ==
On May 22, 1863, General Ulysses S. Grant ordered an assault on the Confederate heights at Vicksburg, Mississippi. The plan called for a storming party of volunteers to build a bridge across a moat and plant scaling ladders against the enemy embankment in advance of the main attack. The volunteers knew the odds were against survival and the mission was called, in nineteenth century vernacular, a "forlorn hope". Only single men were accepted as volunteers and even then, twice as many men as needed came forward and were turned away. The assault began in the early morning following a naval bombardment. (Note: For more information see regimental and siege articles.)

The U.S. soldiers came under enemy fire immediately and were pinned down in the ditch they were to cross. Despite repeated attacks by the main Union body, the men of the forlorn hope were unable to retreat until nightfall. Of the 150 men in the storming party, nearly half were killed. Seventy-nine of the survivors were awarded the Medal of Honor. Sgt. McCornack received his Medal of Honor until January 10, 1865.

== Medal of Honor citation ==
For gallantry in the charge of the volunteer storming party on 22 May 1863.

== Postwar ==
After the war he returned to Illinois and eventually moved to Minnesota. In 1869, he married New Hampshire native Elsie Etta Hanaford with whom he had ten children.

== See also ==
- List of American Civil War Medal of Honor recipients: G–L
