= Emmer Bowen =

Medal of Honor recipient (1830–1912)

- Born: October 25, 1830; Erie County, New York
- Died: December 26, 1912 (aged 82); California
- Burial place: Angelus-Rosedale Cemetery, Los Angeles, California
- Military career
- Allegiance: United States of America; Union
- Branch: United States Army; Union Army
- Rank: Private
- Units: 127th Regiment Illinois Volunteer Infantry - Company C Invalid Corps
- Conflicts: American Civil War • Siege of Vicksburg
- Awards: Medal of Honor

Emmer Bowen (October 10, 1830 – December 26, 1912) was a Union Army soldier during the American Civil War. He received the Medal of Honor for gallantry during the Siege of Vicksburg on May 22, 1863.

Bowen joined the 127th Illinois Infantry in August 1862 and was transferred to the Invalid Corps the following year.

== Union assault ==
On May 22, 1863, General Ulysses S. Grant ordered an assault on the Confederate heights at Vicksburg, Mississippi. The plan called for a storming party of volunteers to build a bridge across a moat and plant scaling ladders against the enemy embankment in advance of the main attack. The volunteers knew the odds were against survival and the mission was called, in nineteenth century vernacular, a "forlorn hope". Only single men were accepted as volunteers and even then, twice as many men as needed came forward and were turned away. The assault began in the early morning following a naval bombardment. The Union soldiers came under enemy fire immediately and were pinned down in the ditch they were to cross. Despite repeated attacks by the main Union body, the men of the forlorn hope were unable to retreat until nightfall. Of the 150 men in the storming party, nearly half were killed. Seventy-nine of the survivors were awarded the Medal of Honor.

== Medal of Honor citation ==
For gallantry in the charge of the volunteer storming party on 22 May 1863.

== See also ==
- List of American Civil War Medal of Honor recipients: A–F
- Battle of Vicksburg
- 83rd Regiment Indiana Volunteer Infantry
