= Reuben Smalley =

American soldier during Civil War

Private Reuben Smalley
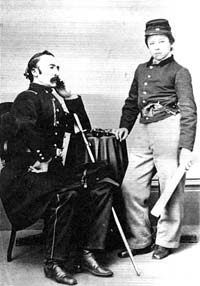
- Born: 28 April 1839; Reading Center, New York
- Died: 9 July 1926 (aged 87); Greensburg, Indiana
- Burial place: South Park Cemetery, Greensburg, Indiana
- Military career
- Allegiance: United States (Union)
- Branch: Army
- Service years: 1862-1865
- Rank: Private
- Units: Company F, 83rd Indiana Infantry
- Conflicts: Vicksburg, Mississippi
- Awards: Medal of Honor

Reuben Smalley (28 April 1839 - 9 July 1926) was a private in the United States Army who was awarded the Medal of Honor for gallantry in the American Civil War. He was awarded the medal on 9 July 1864 for actions performed at the Siege of Vicksburg in Mississippi in May 1863.

== Personal life ==
Smalley was born on 28 April 1839 in Reading Center, New York to parents Elias and Rozelphia Smalley. His father died when he was three years old, and he was subsequently taken in by his uncle to be raised in Jennings County, Indiana. He married Martha Ann Johnson in 1859 and fathered two children, both of whom died in childhood. After the war, he worked as a railroad construction worker and steam engine operator. He was also elected as constable of Greensburg, Indiana. He died on 9 July 1926 in Greensburg and was buried in South Park Cemetery in Greensburg.

== Military service ==
Smalley enlisted in the Army as a private on 15 August 1862 in Holton, Indiana and was assigned to Company F of the 83rd Indiana Infantry. On 22 May 1863, at the Siege of Vicksburg, Smalley volunteered to participate in an infantry charge, the objective of which was to build a bridge over a Confederate trench so that Union forces could take the town of Vicksburg. The charge did not achieve its objective, with over 85% of the 150 men participating in it being killed or wounded throughout the ten hour affair. For this action, the survivors of the charge, including Smalley, were awarded the Medal of Honor.

Smalley's Medal of Honor citation reads:

The President of the United States of America, in the name of Congress, takes pleasure in presenting the Medal of Honor to Private Reuben Smalley, United States Army, for gallantry in the charge of the volunteer storming party on 22 May 1863, while serving with Company F, 83d Indiana Infantry, in action at Vicksburg, Mississippi.

— D. S. Lamont, Secretary of War

Smalley was mustered out of the Army on 1 June 1865 in Washington D.C.
