= 26th Iowa Infantry Regiment =

- Iowa state flag
- Active: September 30, 1862, to June 6, 1865
- Country: United States
- Allegiance: Union
- Branch: Infantry
- Engagements: American Civil War: Battle of Fort Hindman; Siege of Vicksburg; Battle of Lookout Mountain; Battle of Missionary Ridge; Battle of Resaca; Battle of Kennesaw Mountain; Battle of Atlanta; Battle of Jonesboro; March to the Sea

The 26th Iowa Infantry Regiment was an infantry regiment that served in the Union Army during the American Civil War.

== Service ==
The 26th Iowa Infantry was organized at Clinton, Iowa and mustered in for three years of Federal service on September 30, 1862. The regiment was a part of the 3rd brigade, 1st division, XV Corps (Union Army).

The regiment was mustered out on June 6, 1865.

== Total strength and casualties ==
A total of 965 men served in the 26th Iowa at one time or another during its existence. It suffered 6 officers and 70 enlisted men who were killed in action or who died of their wounds and 4 officers and 213 enlisted men who died of disease, for a total of 293 fatalities.

== Commanders ==
- Colonel Milo Smith

== See also ==
- List of Iowa Civil War Units
- Iowa in the American Civil War
