= Richard Gage =

American Civil War soldier

Richard J. Gage
- Born: 1842; Grafton County, New Hampshire
- Died: April 28, 1903 (aged 60–61)
- Burial place: Woodside Cemetery, Seneca, LaSalle County, Illinois
- Military career
- Allegiance: United States of America; Union
- Branch: United States Army; Union Army
- Service years: 1862 - 1865
- Rank: Private
- Units: Company D, 104th Illinois Volunteer Infantry Regiment
- Conflicts: American Civil War
- Awards: Medal of Honor

Richard J. Gage (1842 – April 28, 1903) was a soldier in the 104th Illinois Infantry during the American Civil War. On July 2, 1863, he volunteered for an attack on a blockhouse by the Elk River in Tennessee. On October 30, 1897, he received the Medal of Honor, the highest decoration in the U.S. military, for his participation in this action.

Gage joined the 104th Illinois Infantry in August 1862. He was captured at the Battle of Chickamauga, and was incarcerated at Libby Prison for the next 6 months. Gage was discharged in February 1865.

== Medal of Honor citation ==
Gage's Medal of Honor citation reads:

Voluntarily joined a small party that, under a heavy fire, captured a stockade and saved the bridge.

== See also ==
- List of Medal of Honor recipients
