= Thomas A. Blasdel =

Union Army soldier

Thomas Annis Blasdel
- Born: January 2, 1843; Dearborn County, Indiana, US
- Died: October 12, 1932 (aged 89); Sylvia, Reno County, Kansas, US
- Military career
- Allegiance: United States; Union
- Branch: US Army; Union Army
- Service years: 1862 - 1865
- Rank: Corporal
- Unit: 83rd Regiment Indiana Volunteer Infantry - Company H
- Conflicts: American Civil War • Siege of Vicksburg
- Awards: Medal of Honor

Thomas A. Blasdel (His surname is sometimes listed as Blasedale) (January 2, 1843 – October 12, 1932) was a Union Army soldier during the American Civil War. He received the Medal of Honor for gallantry during the 1863 Siege of Vicksburg. Blasdel enlisted in the Union army at 19 years old in August, 1862, during the Civil War. He went on to get promoted to Private, and from there to Corporal.

== Early life ==
Thomas A. Blasdel was born on January 2, 1843, in Dearborn County, Indiana, United States of America. His parents were named Ferris Enoch Blasdel and Clarissa Annis Blasdel and they too were born in America. Thomas was the second oldest of 9 children; 5 girls and 4 boys. His siblings were: Rhoda, Pamelia, Eleanor, George, Enoch, John, Clara, Raymond, and Rachel.

== Career ==
For most of his military career, Thomas Blasdel served as a private in Company H, 83rd Indiana Infantry. He is most famous for his contribution during the Siege of Vicksburg, Mississippi.

On May 22, 1863, General Ulysses S. Grant ordered an assault on the Confederate heights at Vicksburg. The plan called for a storming party of volunteers to build a bridge across a moat and plant scaling ladders against the enemy embankment in advance of the main attack. Blasdel was 20 years old at the time and, while he hadn't been in the army for a full year, he volunteered to be a part of this party. The volunteers were well aware that the odds of survival were slim and the mission was called, in nineteenth century vernacular, a "forlorn hope". Only single men were accepted as volunteers and even then, twice as many men as needed came forward and all but 150 men were turned away.

The event started in the morning, not very long after a naval bombardment by the opposing side. The Union soldiers came under enemy fire immediately and were pinned down in the moat they were to cross. Even though there were multiple attacks by the Confederates, the party with Blasdel was able to hold off the opposing side. This went on until night, when both sides retreated because of darkness. Out of the 150 volunteers, around half were killed, which was much better than the men had predicted. 79 of the survivors (including Blasdel) were eventually awarded the Medal of Honor.

Blasdel was discharged in June 1865. On August 11, 1894, at the age of 51 and 31 years after the fact, Blasdel received the Medal of Honor for gallantry during the Siege of Vicksburg.

== Later life ==
Blasdel married Elizabeth and had a child, Emert. Elizabeth died in 1928 and Thomas on October 12, 1932, in Reno County, Kansas.

== Medal of Honor citation ==
For gallantry in the charge of the volunteer storming party on 22 May 1863.

== See also ==
- List of American Civil War Medal of Honor recipients: A–F
- Battle of Vicksburg
- 83rd Regiment Indiana Volunteer Infantry
