= 83rd Indiana Infantry Regiment =

- Active: September 4, 1862 – June 3, 1865
- Country: United States
- Allegiance: Union
- Branch: Infantry
- Engagements: Yazoo Pass Expedition; Battle of Chickasaw Bayou; Battle of Arkansas Post; Battle of Champion Hill; Siege of Vicksburg, May 19 & May 22 assaults Chattanooga campaign Battle of Missionary Ridge; Atlanta campaign Battle of Resaca; Battle of Dallas; Battle of New Hope Church; Battle of Allatoona; Battle of Kennesaw Mountain; Battle of Atlanta; Siege of Atlanta; Battle of Jonesborough; Battle of Lovejoy's Station; Sherman's March to the Sea; Carolinas campaign Battle of Bentonville

The 83rd Indiana Infantry Regiment, sometimes called 83rd Indiana Volunteer Infantry Regiment, was an infantry regiment that served in the Union Army during the American Civil War.

== Service ==
The 83rd Indiana Infantry was organized at Lawrenceburg, Indiana September 4 - November 5, 1862, and mustered in for a three-year enlistment under the command of Colonel Benjamin J. Spooner.

The regiment was attached to 4th Brigade, 5th Division, District of Memphis, Tennessee, XIII Corps, Department of the Tennessee, November 1862. 2nd Brigade, 2nd Division, District of Memphis, XIII Corps, to December 1862. 2nd Brigade, 2nd Division, Sherman's Yazoo Expedition, to January 1863. 2nd Brigade, 2nd Division, XV Corps, Army of the Tennessee, to June 1865.

The 83rd Indiana Infantry mustered out of service on June 3, 1865.

== Detailed service ==
=== 1862 ===
- Ordered to Memphis, Tennessee and duty there to November 26, 1862.
- "Tallahatchie March" November 26-December 13, 1862.
- Sherman's Yazoo Expedition December 20, 1862 to January 3, 1863.
  - Chickasaw Bayou December 26–28.
  - Chickasaw Bluff December 29.

=== 1863 ===
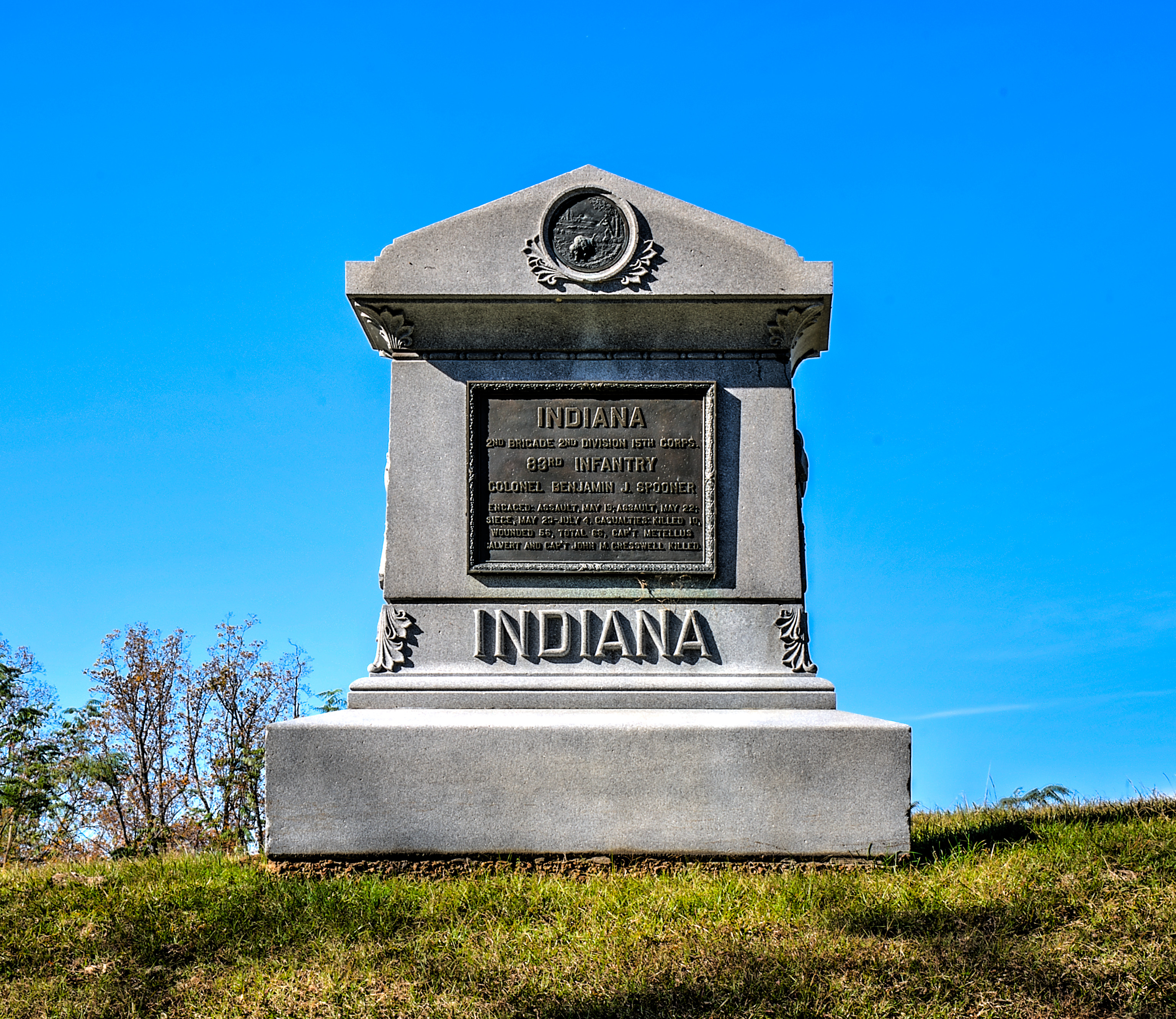
Memorial at Vicksburg National Military Park

- Expedition to Arkansas Post, Arkansas, January 3–10, 1863.
- Assault and capture of Fort Hindman, Arkansas Post, January 10–11.
- Moved to Young's Point, Louisiana, January 17, and duty there until April.
- Black Bayou March 24–25.
- Demonstration on Haines' and Drumgould's Bluffs April 29-May 2.
- Movement to join army in rear of Vicksburg, Mississippi, May 2–14.
- Battle of Champion Hill May 16.
- Siege of Vicksburg May 18-July 4.
  - Assaults on Vicksburg May 19 and 22.
- Advance on Jackson, Mississippi, July 4–10.
- Siege of Jackson July 10–17.
- Camp at Big Black to Chattanooga, Tennessee, September 26-November 20.
- Operations on the Memphis & Charleston Railroad in Alabama October 20–29.
- Cherokee Station, Alabama, October 21.
- Bear Creek, Tuscumbia, October 27.
- Chattanooga-Ringgold Campaign November 23–27.
  - Tunnel Hill November 23–25.
  - Missionary Ridge November 25.
- Pursuit to Graysville November 26–27.
- March to relief of Knoxville, Tennessee, November 28-December 8.
- Garrison duty in Alabama until May 1864.

=== 1864 ===
- Atlanta Campaign May 1 to September 8, 1864.
  - Demonstrations on Resaca May 8–13.
  - Near Resaca May 13.
  - Battle of Resaca May 14–15.
  - Advance on Dallas May 18–25.
  - Operations on line of Pumpkin Vine Creek and battles about Dallas, New Hope Church, and Allatoona Hills May 25-June 5.
  - Operations about Marietta and against Kennesaw Mountain June 10-July 2.
  - Assault on Kennesaw June 27.
  - Ruff's Mills July 3–4.
  - Chattahoochie River July 6–17.
  - Battle of Atlanta July 22.
  - Siege of Atlanta July 22-August 25.
    - Ezra Chapel, Hood's second sortie, July 28.
  - Flank movement on Jonesboro August 25–30.
  - Battle of Jonesborough August 31-September 1.
  - Lovejoy's Station September 2–6.
- Operations in northern Georgia and northern Alabama against Hood September 29-November 3.
- Turkeytown and Gadsden Road, Alabama, October 25.
- "March to the Sea" November 15-December 10.
- Siege of Savannah, Georgia, December 10–21.
- Fort McAllister December 13.

=== 1865 ===
- Campaign of the Carolinas January to April, 1865.
  - Cannon's Bridge, South Edisto River, South Carolina, February 8.
  - Orangeburg February 11–12.
  - North Edisto River February 12–13.
  - Columbia February 16–17.
  - Battle of Bentonville, North Carolina, March 19–21.
  - Occupation of Goldsboro March 24.
  - Advance on Raleigh April 10–14.
  - Occupation of Raleigh April 14.
  - Bennett's House April 26.
  - Surrender of Johnston and his army.
- March to Washington, D.C., via Richmond, Virginia, April 29-May 20.
- Grand Review of the Armies May 24.

== Casualties ==
The regiment lost a total of 284 men during service; 5 officers and 56 enlisted men killed or mortally wounded, 3 officers and 220 enlisted men died of disease.

== Commanders ==
- Colonel Benjamin J. Spooner
- Captain William N. Craw - commanded during the Carolinas Campaign
- Captain Charles W. White - commanded during the Carolinas Campaign

== Notable members ==
- Private Clinton Lycurgus Armstrong, Company D - Medal of Honor — Participating in a diversionary "forlorn hope" attack on Confederate defenses, 22 May 1863.
- Private Thomas A. Blasdel, Company H - Medal of Honor — Participating in the same "forlorn hope."
- Private John Wesley Conaway, Company C - Medal of Honor — Participating in the same "forlorn hope."
- Private Joseph Frantz - Company E - Medal of Honor — Participating in the same "forlorn hope."
- Private Jacob H. Overturf - Company K - Medal of Honor — Participating in the same "forlorn hope."
- Private Reuben Smalley, Company F - Medal of Honor — Participating in the same "forlorn hope."
- Corporal William Steinmetz, Company G - Medal of Honor — Participating in the same "forlorn hope."
- Private Frank Stolz, Company G - Medal of Honor — Participating in the same "forlorn hope."
- Sgt. Fredrick Neu, second great-grandfather of Bradley Whitford

== See also ==
- List of Indiana Civil War regiments
- Indiana in the Civil War
