= Sex verification and intersex athletes at the Olympic Games =

The Olympic Games mandates sex verification of athletes in women's competitions, and has done since the 1930s. In this time, there have been many different regulations for sex testing, as well as different types of tests used. Initial concerns that prompted the approval of suspicion-based sex testing were of national teams exploiting intersex athletes for Olympic success, and testing first became a requirement in the 1960s when many female athletes were doped and it was harder to tell physical differences between them and men.

In its history, different sex testing methods at the Olympics have been known to produce false positive and false negative results, incorrectly excluding some women. Through sex testing, there are no confirmed cases of athletes inaccurately stating their sex. The International Olympic Committee re-confirmed the use of sex verification in several meetings in the 1980s and 1990s, each time confirming its use for preventing "male imposters", and not aiming to exclude intersex women.

Sex testing at the Olympics has been criticized for a variety of reasons, and was briefly stopped. Various international medical and sports professionals have advocated for the abolition of sex verification in sport, and specifically the Olympics. In March 2026, the IOC announced a new policy for women's events, allowing only athletes classified as female through mandatory genetic sex screening to compete in it.

== Regulations and methods of sex verification ==
=== Introduction of regulations ===
Women first competed at the Olympic Games in 1900, with an increased programme available for women to enter from 1924. Prior to 1936, sex verification may have been done ad hoc, but there were no formal regulations; the existence of intersex people was known about, though, and the Olympics began "dealing with" – acknowledged and sought to regulate – intersex athletes ahead of the 1936 Games, following the case of intersex athlete Zdeněk Koubek becoming globally known in 1935.

=== Overview ===
Timeline of regulations and methods of sex verification
Period	Pre-1936	1936–1966	1967–1991	1992–1996	1999–2012	2012–2015	2015–2017	2017–2019	2020–2023
Olympics regulations	None, or ad hoc	Athletes in women's categories to be examined in cases of doubt	All female athletes to be tested prior to participation	Female athletes at the Olympic Games to be tested	Female athletes to be tested in cases of doubt	Female athletes to be tested in cases of doubt	No testing due to legal challenges	Female athletes to be tested in cases of doubt	Female athletes to be tested prior to participation in various athletics disciplines, predominantly middle-distance running; Other female athletes to be tested in cases of doubt; Athletes who do not meet the testing requirements may receive medical or hormonal interventions to meet the eligibility standards
Verification test used	Physical examination		X-Chromatin test: two X chromosomes	SRY test	?	Testosterone measurements	n/a	Testosterone measurements	Combination of chromatin test, testosterone measurements, and consideration of androgen insensitivity syndrome

=== History of regulations and tests ===
==== 1936–1966: Physical examination in cases of doubt ====
After Zdeněk Koubek, a Czech athlete raised as a woman, was identified as intersex and transitioned to live as a man in 1935, then-United States Olympic Committee (USOC)-president Avery Brundage expressed concern over the potential for such athletes to be exploited for Olympic gain. The USOC requested the International Olympic Committee (IOC) to permit medical examinations of any athletes whose sex was questioned, which became policy in time for the 1936 Summer Olympics. It did not appear to be applied in 1936, though there were some notable cases in the form of Stella Walsh and Heinrich Ratjen. Walsh's case was handled sympathetically, while Ratjen's Olympics appearance may have been deliberately dishonest.

Walsh and her American rival Helen Stephens were accused of being men by other competitors in 1936, and Stephens' gender was questioned by Polish media disgruntled that the Poland-born Walsh had been beaten by her. At the Olympics, Stephens said that Adolf Hitler (who was overseeing the Games) groped her as a joke to check; Stephens later took and passed a gender test. Upon Walsh's death in 1980, however, it was discovered that Walsh was intersex, though it was also determined she likely never knew. Ratjen, who was raised female, was never tested during sporting events. He was accosted by the police before being forced to strip and then arrested in 1938, at which point he admitted to being a man; he was intersex and identified as male. Claims that Nazi Germany had noticed his biological difference and made him compete as a woman in order to win for them were considered without merit.

International sports was disrupted by World War II, and the requirement for female athletes to show a medical certificate proving their sex at competition was introduced by 1946. There was no universal standard of testing, however, with sporting bodies allowing whichever nation or medical professional had produced an athlete's certificate to use their own definition of "femininity".

==== 1967–1991: X-Chromatin testing for all women participants ====
Trusting an athlete's nation to be medically accurate ended in the 1960s, however, and sports federations began regulating "femininity". In the 1960s, when systemic doping became a significant issue and it was harder to tell the difference between men and doped women, formal sex verification was first implemented as a requirement: between 1968 and 1998, all female athletes at the Olympics were subject to sex verification as a matter of process. Testing as a requirement had been gradually introduced at other events in 1966 and 1967, some of which still used the previous invasive physical examinations. An early test at the 1967 European Cup incorrectly identified Ewa Kłobukowska as not female, seeing her previous Olympic achievements written off and her career end. Kłobukowska is missing an X chromosome, a genetic disorder that does not make her intersex or biologically male. However, the test being used – and which would officially be used for the next 25 years – was for identifying Barr bodies, a sign of the presence of two (or more) X chromosomes. Kłobukowska had previously passed the sex test at a competition in 1966, which should have permitted her to compete in future. The Barr body test was first trialled by the IOC at the 1968 Winter Olympics, where Erik(a) Schinegger's intersex condition was discovered and he was removed from participation, before being implemented at the 1968 Summer Olympics.

There was one known exception of a female Olympic athlete who was not subject to sex verification: Anne, Princess Royal, who competed in 1976. Considered unnecessary for such a public figure, Anne also competed in equestrian eventing – which features teams of four riders of any sex.

The test to identify multiple X chromosomes had already been considered unreliable in the scientific community for decades, which stopped using it by 1970, but remained widespread in sports until 1992. In this time, the test incorrectly banned at least one other female athlete in addition to Kłobukowska: Maria José Martínez-Patiño, who was banned after she qualified for the 1988 Summer Olympics, before being reinstated later in 1988 after these Games took place.

==== 1992–1996: SRY testing for all women participants ====
Ahead of the 1992 Winter Olympics, the Olympics stopped using the X-Chromatin tests. The Olympics initially replaced the X chromosome test with an SRY test, relating to a gene of the Y chromosome. Later in 1992, other sports federations, including the IAAF (now World Athletics), stopped all sex testing unless suspicion arose; IAAF events included drug testing through athletes producing a urine sample while visible to the medics, which was suggested to effectively serve as a visible sex confirmation and prevent the need for testing. Five sports federations, including judo and volleyball, continued requiring sex verification. At the same time, the Olympics decided to permit the participation of female athletes who had undergone "sex reassignment surgery", two years after their surgery and predicated on meeting the typical requirements.

The SRY test was used for all athletes at the 1996 Summer Olympics. Prior to the 1996 Games, intersex Brazilian judoka Edinanci Silva had surgery to allow her to continue in women's sport – going on to compete at four Olympics – while Philippine sprint hopeful Nancy Navalta was tested and ruled intersex, being removed from her delegation for the Games. There were eight (unknown) female athletes competing in 1996 who were discovered to have an intersex condition upon testing. All had full or partial androgen insensitivity, and all were allowed to compete. In 1999, the IOC abolished the universal testing so as to protect the dignity of athletes who do not already know they have these conditions.

==== 1999–2019: Reversion to suspicion-based testing ====
In the late 1990s, there was major pushback against sex verification among relevant professional bodies, including the American Medical Association; among the criticisms was the SRY test not producing reliable results. Starting with the 2000 Summer Olympics, the IOC stopped testing all female participants, but continued to perform sex testing for athletes of any gender (though invariably women) when "serious doubts" were raised. In the 21st century, it also stopped using chromosome screening for tests.

Following various changes in policy by other sporting bodies at the start of the 21st century, the IOC issued new guidance ahead of the 2012 Summer Olympics, focusing on cases of hyperandrogenism and so testing for testosterone. Such tests were still done only by request, and were also deemed unreliable and discriminatory, especially considering the effects of androgen insensitivity. The increased concern regarding testosterone had begun with the IAAF investigating Caster Semenya after her success at the 2009 World Championships in Athletics. In 2015, however, testosterone testing had to be suspended following a legal case brought by Dutee Chand in the Court of Arbitration for Sport (CAS), which ruled that there was insufficient proof of any advantage to discriminate against all women with hyperandrogenism.

Immediately prior to the 2016 Olympic Games and in response to sex verification controversies, Myron Genel, Joe Leigh Simpson and Albert de la Chapelle in the Journal of the American Medical Association stated "One of the fundamental recommendations published almost 25 years ago ... that athletes born with a disorder of sex development and raised as females be allowed to compete as women remains appropriate".

In 2017, in response to the CAS ruling on Chand's case, a study was published that analysed athletic performance and hormone concentrations. It concluded that female athletes with high testosterone levels have a significant competitive advantage over those with low testosterone levels in 400 m, 400 m hurdles, 800 m, hammer throw, and pole vault.

In 2018, World Athletics began requiring intersex women to medically or surgically alter themselves in order to be eligible, which could prevent them from attending events that serve as Olympic qualifiers. Semenya has refused to take hormone medication, which saw her banned from participation.

==== 2026: Reinstating SRY testing ====
In March 2026, the IOC announced a new policy for women's events, allowing only athletes classified as female through mandatory genetic sex screening to compete in it. The IOC stated that the new policy aims to create a consistent rule across all Olympic sports and prioritize fairness and safety during competition, while allowing athletes who do not meet the criteria to compete in male or open categories.

== Criticisms ==
Various international medical and sports professionals have, since 1986, advocated for the abolition of sex verification in sport, and specifically the Olympics. In 2000, following the 1999 IOC ratification of the 1996 decision to discontinue sex verification, the view was reiterated in the Journal of the American Medical Association; it included commentary that, while the purpose of such tests is to uphold a perceived fairness, the insufficiency of the tests can produce unfair results due to potential inaccuracies and the possibility of both false negatives and false positives. The authors also deemed the tests unfair and discriminatory towards female athletes with disorders of sex development (DSD), whom it felt should be considered as women for the purposes of sport, as "few if any plausible athletic advantages exist". It also considered the implications for female athletes who "fail" a test (either as an error or through unknowingly having a DSD), in their personal lives and future career, as too severe to impose the tests.

For several years, sex testing used a suspicion-based approach, which has been criticised as it enables racist discrimination.

In 2022, the World Medical Association (WMA) demanded the withdrawal of hormone-based regulations, arguing that they discriminate based on gender variation of female athletes. The Association also expressed concerns with physicians treating athletes with high levels of endogenous testosterone when the condition is not pathological.

Other criticisms are that there is no natural physiological limit imposed on male athletes, including those who have, for example, naturally high testosterone compared to their competitors, and that there are many biological factors that produce sporting advantages but "only those associated with gender are used to exclude or disqualify athletes."

In a joint statement published several days before the official IOC announcement on genetic testing in March 2026, over 100 human rights and other groups criticized the proposed rule change as "a blunt and discriminatory response that is not supported by science and violates international human rights law".

== List of intersex Olympic athletes ==
=== Identification ===
This list includes athletes who have competed at the Olympic Games, or were set to compete at the Olympic Games, and who have a known intersex (disorders/differences of sex development; DSD) condition and this is publicly known. The 1932 Summer Olympics was the first instance of an athlete now known to be intersex competing at the Olympics. The majority of intersex Olympians have competed in athletics, generally running. (Note: Based on the information collected on this page)

In its history, different sex testing methods at the Olympics have been known to produce false positive and false negative results, incorrectly excluding some biological females. The athletes listed may or may not identify as intersex or having a DSD.

Athletes with a DSD may be known as intersex, with the terms often understood interchangeably; the term "hermaphrodite" is now widely discredited. DSDs are congenital conditions affecting the reproductive system, in which development of chromosomal, gonadal, or anatomical sex is atypical. As a biological status, intersex people may identify as heterosexual and cisgender. While intersex people face specific issues that LGBT+ people do not, in sports they are often considered alongside transgender athletes who have transitioned, with similar barriers to participation.

=== Overview ===
By country
Country	Number of Olympians		
Country	F	M	Total
Austria	—	1	1
Brazil	2	1	3
Burundi	1	—	1
Germany (Note: Including Nazi Germany)	–	1	1
India	1	—	1
Kenya	1	—	1
Namibia	2	–	2
Niger	1	—	1
Poland	1	–	1
South Africa	1	—	1

By year
Games	Number of Olympians (Note: Including multi-year appearances of the same Olympian.)		
Games	F	M	Total
1932 Summer	1	—	1
1936 Summer	1	1	2
1968 Winter	—	1	1
1996 Summer	2	—	2
2000 Summer	2	—	2
2004 Summer	2	—	2
2008 Summer	1	—	1
2012 Summer	2	—	2
2016 Summer	4	—	4
2020 Summer (Note: Took place in 2021 due to the COVID-19 pandemic.)	5	1	6

By sport
Sport	Number of Olympians by gender		
Sport	Female	Male	Total
Alpine skiing	—	1 (Note: Competed in a women's category)	1
Athletics	9	1	10
Judo	1	—	1
Swimming	—	1	1
Volleyball	1	—	1

=== List ===
- Tables are default sorted by first Games appearance chronologically, then current surname or common nickname alphabetically, then first name alphabetically. They can be sorted by current surname (where used) or common nickname alphabetically; by country and sport alphabetically; by Games chronologically; (Note: Where athletes have represented multiple countries, competed in multiple sports, and/or at multiple Games, the country/sport/Games they are sorted by is their first country/sport/Games chronologically.) and by medals as organised in Olympics medals tables. (Note: Based on most golds over total medals, then alphabetically by current surname or common nickname.)

Athlete	Country	Sport	Games	Medal(s)	Details	Regulations and verification
Stanisława Walasiewicz (a.k.a. Stella Walsh)	Poland	Athletics	1932, 1936	1st place, gold medalist(s) 2nd place, silver medalist(s)	Won a gold medal in 1932 and a silver medal in 1936. An autopsy discovered that Walsh was intersex and experienced mosaicism; it was determined she likely did not know, and her achievements have not been expunged.	There were no formal regulations before 1936; from 1936, the IOC was able to examine athletes whose sex was questioned. Anecdotally, Walsh's rival Helen Stephens reported that in 1936, Adolf Hitler personally groped her as a form of sex verification.
Heinrich Ratjen	Nazi Germany	Athletics	1936		Ratjen's sex characteristics were ambiguous from birth. Though he was raised as female, and for many years competed as "Dora Ratjen" (including at the Olympics), he said he was conscious that he was somewhat biologically male from childhood. In 1938, he was arrested and held in Hohenlychen Sanatorium for a year, being examined by SS doctors who found Ratjen to have some intersex characteristics (not just male genitalia). Upon release, he was ordered to stop participating in sport and to assume a male identity. In later life, however, Ratjen (likely erroneously) claimed that the Nazis had ordered him to pose as female in order to bring sporting glory to the nation at their home Olympics.	From 1936, the IOC was able to examine athletes whose sex was questioned. After years of speculation and reportedly refusing to use changing rooms with other people present, Ratjen was accosted on a train and made to strip before being arrested.
Erik Schinegger	Austria	Alpine skiing	1968 (Note: Did not compete)		Schinegger was raised as Erika and competed in skiing as a woman until 1968, when his intersex condition was discovered. He was removed from participation, going on to live as a man and father a child. He was not retroactively stripped of his 1966 World Championship title, but the original runner-up Marielle Goitschel was retroactively awarded the gold medal as well. In 1988 Schinegger himself presented his World Championship gold medal to Goitschel, though she gave it back to him.	Formal medical testing, using the X-Chromatin test, was first trialled by the IOC at the 1968 Winter Olympics, before being implemented at the 1968 Summer Olympics.
Nancy Navalta	Philippines	Athletics	1996		Navalta was named part of the Philippines' delegation for the 1996 Summer Olympics after attaining a qualifying time. However her career ended after she learned about her intersex condition in 1996 and she was removed from the team.	In 1992, the majority of the sports federations under the IOC stopped performing any type of gender testing, and the IOC itself replaced the chromosome testing with a DNA-based test. This test was carried out on all female athletes in 1996.
Edinanci Silva	Brazil	Judo	1996, 2000, 2004, 2008		Silva was born intersex but had surgery in the 1990s to allow her to compete in women's sport, before any Olympics appearance. She went on to compete at four Games.	In 1992, the majority of the sports federations under the IOC stopped performing any type of gender testing. Judo was one of the five federations that continued testing, and the IOC itself replaced the chromosome testing with a DNA-based test. This test was carried out on all female athletes in 1996. In 1999, the IOC stopped universal testing but reserved the right to test suspicious individuals. The same test was used up to and including the 2008 Summer Olympics, but only when suspicions were raised. Athletes who had undergone "sex reassignment surgery" were allowed to compete, two years after surgery and meeting all other requirements.
Érika Coimbra	Brazil	Volleyball	2000, 2004	3rd place, bronze medalist(s)	Coimbra was reported to have been born intersex but had surgery. She was subject to sex testing before being allowed to compete.	In 1999, the IOC stopped universal testing but reserved the right to test suspicious individuals. The same test was used up to and including the 2008 Summer Olympics, but only when suspicions were raised. Athletes who had undergone "sex reassignment surgery" were allowed to compete, two years after surgery and meeting all other requirements.
Francine Niyonsaba	Burundi	Athletics	2012, 2016, 2020	2nd place, silver medalist(s)	Niyonsaba won silver in the 800 m race in 2016; unable to contest this event at the 2020 Games due to restrictions, she qualified and competed in the 10,000 m race. Her intersex condition was revealed upon the ruling in 2019.	In 2012, the IOC introduced testing based on measuring testosterone. Ahead of qualifying for the 2016 Summer Olympics, the IAAF was forced to suspend testosterone testing until at least 2017 due to losing a case brought by Dutee Chand. The IOC updated its policy around the same time and, in 2016, said they would also suspend testosterone testing while the IAAF was trying to support the tests. In 2019, World Athletics (IAAF) banned female athletes from competing in middle-distance running events and some others (Note: Including hammer throw, not including football.) if they: have an XY karyotype and; have ≥5 nmol/L testosterone and; do not have androgen insensitivity
Caster Semenya	South Africa	Athletics	2012, 2016	1st place, gold medalist(s)	Semenya is an intersex woman with XY chromosomes. She has been subject to sex verification testing since the start of her professional career in 2009, at different times being allowed and disallowed to compete in events. A successful intersex sportswoman, she has been the focal point of debates and regulation regarding both intersex and trans athletes in the 21st century. She has refused to take hormone medication to reduce her natural testosterone, as instructed in 2019. She continues to mount legal battles against athletic bodies.	
Dutee Chand	India	Athletics	2016, 2020		Chand experiences hyperandrogenism. In 2014, her elevated testosterone caused the Indian Athletics Federation to remove her from its programme and ban her from events. She appealed to higher athletic bodies, which overturned the ban. As a sprinter, she was unaffected by the 2019 restrictions on intersex characteristics in middle distance events; she offered the services of her legal team to Caster Semenya.	
Margaret Wambui	Kenya	Athletics	2016	3rd place, bronze medalist(s)	Wambui has elevated testosterone levels, as revealed upon the intersex restriction ruling in 2019; refusing to take medication to reduce this, she was barred from competing in the 2020 Games. She has proposed athletic bodies introduce an open category to be inclusive of intersex athletes if they insist on the separation.	Ahead of qualifying for the 2016 Summer Olympics, the IAAF was forced to suspend testosterone testing until at least 2017 due to losing a case brought by Dutee Chand. The IOC updated its policy around the same time and, in 2016, said they would also suspend testosterone testing while the IAAF was trying to support the tests. In 2019, World Athletics (IAAF) banned female athletes from competing in middle-distance running events and some others if they: have an XY karyotype and; have ≥5 nmol/L testosterone and; do not have androgen insensitivity
Beatrice Masilingi	Namibia	Athletics	2020		Condition announced by World Athletics ahead of appearing at the 2020 Games. The Namibia National Olympic Committee criticised World Athletics for breaking a confidentiality agreement in naming teenage sprinters Beatrice Masilingi and Christine Mboma, who could (and would) both compete over a different distance.	In 2019, World Athletics (IAAF) banned female athletes from competing in middle-distance running events and some others if they: have an XY karyotype and; have ≥5 nmol/L testosterone and; do not have androgen insensitivity
Christine Mboma	Namibia	Athletics	2020	2nd place, silver medalist(s)	Condition announced by World Athletics ahead of appearing at the 2020 Games. The Namibia National Olympic Committee criticised World Athletics for breaking a confidentiality agreement in naming teenage sprinters Beatrice Masilingi and Christine Mboma, who could (and would) both compete over a different distance.	In 2019, World Athletics (IAAF) banned female athletes from competing in middle-distance running events and some others if they: have an XY karyotype and; have ≥5 nmol/L testosterone and; do not have androgen insensitivity
Aminatou Seyni	Niger	Athletics	2020		Seyni primarily contests sprint distances, but also ran 800 m sporadically and 400 m regularly until 2019, when she was told she had tested positive for intersex characteristics and would be unable to race middle distance. She ran in the 200 m event, a distance over which she holds the Nigerien national record, at the 2020 Games.	In 2019, World Athletics (IAAF) banned female athletes from competing in middle-distance running events and some others if they: have an XY karyotype and; have ≥5 nmol/L testosterone and; do not have androgen insensitivity
Pedro Spajari	Brazil	Swimming	2020		Having broken the FINA World Junior Championship record for 100 m freestyle in 2015, Spajari was diagnosed with Klinefelter syndrome, an XXY chromosomal condition in natural men, in 2016. He was aiming to qualify for that year's Games when decreased testosterone levels, which negatively affected his performances, was noticed. He was approved to take hormone supplements, and competed in 2020.	Sex verification is not conducted on athletes in the men's categories. If a male athlete's performance is considered suspicious, doping controls are used.
Imane Khelif	Algeria	Boxing	2024	1st place, gold medalist(s)	According to GLAAD, Imane Khelif has naturally high testosterone and possesses the SRY gene. She reduced her testosterone levels through medication prior to competing and winning a gold medal in the 2024 Summer Olympics.	In olympic boxing during the 2024 Summer Olympics, eligibility was determined based on the sex indicated on one's passport.
