= Sex verification in sports =

This graph of "Acceptable Testosterone Levels in Females and Males Compared to a Hypothetical Athlete" shows a situation in which the hypothetical athlete above may be a female with hyperandrogenism, higher than normal levels of testosterone, and would be subjected to sex verification tests and possibly forced to undergo aggressive medical protocols.

Sex verification in sports (also known as gender verification, gender determination, or a sex test) consists of tests conducted to determine an athlete's eligibility for sporting events that are restricted to women or for mixed-sex competitions with specific gender requirements. Practice has varied tremendously over time, across borders and by competitive level. Issues have arisen multiple times in the Olympic games and other high-profile sporting competitions, for example allegations that certain male athletes attempted to compete as women or that certain female athletes had intersex conditions perceived to give unfair advantage. The topic of sex verification is related to the more recent question of how to treat transgender people in sports. Sex verification is not typically conducted on athletes competing in the male category because there is generally no perceived competitive advantage for a female or intersex athlete to compete in male categories.

Sex verification in sports began in the 1940s with "femininity certificates" provided by a physician. It subsequently evolved into visual inspections, physical examinations, chromosome testing, and later testosterone level testing. These tests were all designed to ensure that athletes were only allowed to compete as their sex, but mostly resulted in the exclusion of intersex athletes from female sports. Mandatory sex verification testing was fueled by anxieties surrounding the "unfemininity" of some female athletes, as more participated in historically "masculine" events (e.g., track and field).

Sex verification can be substantially more complicated than checking whether a person's sex chromosome pair (Note: Also called the allosome or 23rd pair. However, unlike the 22 autosome pairs, XY looks mismatched while XX operates by switching one off—leading many to not refer to allosomes as a pair.) is XX vs. XY, or comparing their levels of key sex hormones to distinct reference ranges, to determine an athlete's sex. This is due to variations in human biology where some people are not unambiguously female or male, not all cells in a person's body have the same genotype or the presence of other atypical genetic condition. These reasons, among others, led sporting bodies to abandon chromosome testing towards the end of the 20th century and use hormone testing instead. The downside of hormone testing, however, is that policies on hyperandrogenism (women with naturally higher testosterone) were required, which have sparked both public debate and legal battles.

== History ==
From 1946 to 1966, national sporting associations conducted sex verification testing. The first mandatory sex test issued by the International Association of Athletics Federations (IAAF), the world's track and field governing body, for woman athletes was in July 1950 in the month before the European Championships in Belgium. All athletes were tested in their own countries. The IAAF instituted sex testing at the actual games, starting at the 1966 European Athletics Championships in response to suspicion that several female athletes from the Soviet Union and Eastern Europe were actually men. At the Olympics, testing was introduced in 1968. Subsequent reports have shown that the tests could cause psychological harm. Sex verification—identifying athletes whose hormone levels are abnormal compared to others of their purported sex—can cause sex identity crises, elicit demeaning reactions (publicly and privately), isolate athletes socially, and lead to depression and sometimes suicide.

=== Physical examinations ===
Future IOC president Avery Brundage requested, during or shortly after the 1936 Summer Olympics in Berlin, that a system be established to examine female athletes. According to a Time magazine article about intersex people, Brundage felt the need to clarify "sex ambiguities" after observing the performance of Czechoslovak runner and jumper Zdeňka Koubková and English shotputter and javelin thrower Mary Edith Louise Weston. Both individuals later had gender reassignment surgery and legally changed their names, to Zdeněk Koubek and Mark Weston, respectively.

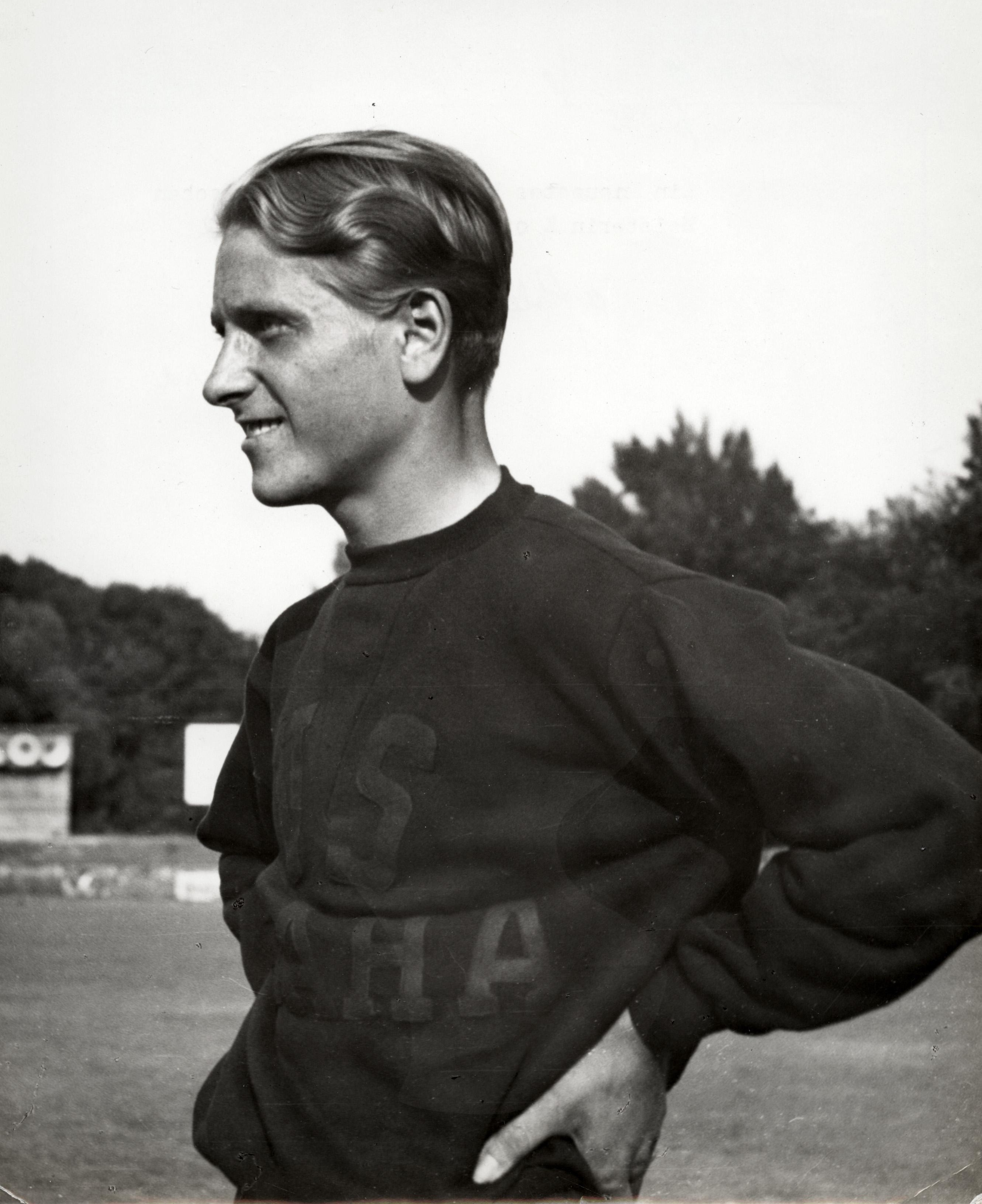
Zdeněk Koubek

Mark Weston

Sex verification tests began in 1950 with the IAAF, using physical examinations. "Sex segregation and verification are mutually interdependent because, if there were no claims or basis for having separate male and female sporting events, there would be no need for sex verification testing." Initially, women athletes "were asked to parade nude before a panel of doctors". For a period of time these tests were mandatory for female athletes, due to fears that male athletes would pose as female athletes and have an unfair advantage over their competitors. Additionally, fears increased in the mid-20th Century about female athletes not being "true" women as it became more acceptable for women to compete in sporting events.

At the 1966 British Empire and Commonwealth Games, the IAAF required that all female athletes undergo a gynaecological examination to confirm they possessed female genitalia. Two weeks later, at the 1966 European Athletics Championships, they conducted visual examinations. This process was deemed the "nude parade" and many athletes reported feeling humiliated by these procedures. The International Olympic Committee (IOC) never adopted these methods.

=== Chromosome testing ===
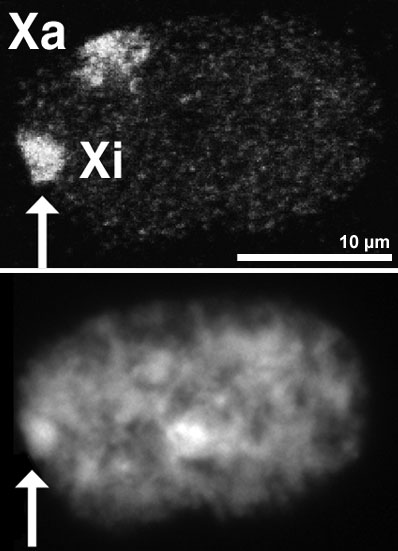
The Barr body is indicated by the arrow. They are only present in cells with XX chromosomes. This was the evidence searched for in Barr body tests of samples from female athlete's inner cheeks.

From 1958 to 1992, all female athletes underwent mandatory sex verification tests before taking part in any IAAF or IOC event. Barr body tests were conducted by taking samples from inside the cheek to find evidence of XX chromosomes, indicating the athlete was female. This test was first conducted by the IAAF in 1967 at the European Cup Track and Field event in Kiev, Soviet Union. Those who passed the tests and verified as females were provided femininity certificates which they could use at all future international competitions. Compulsory sex verification tests were commonplace and not many female athletes questioned the practice until the late 1980s.

Chromosome testing was criticized by scientists, such as de la Chapelle, Ferguson-Smith, Ferris, Ljungqvist, and Simpson. They, among others, argued the Barr body test did not take into account gonadal, morphological, and psychological sex attributes. Ultimately, a central contention was whether a Y chromosome yields a competitive advantage because it is not always accompanied by "manly" attributes that provide greater strength, power, or flexibility.

In 1985, runner Maria José Martínez-Patiño failed her sex verification at the World University Games in Kobe, Japan, after passing the test at the 1983 World Championships in Athletics. Martínez-Patiño was told to retire discreetly due to her results, which was commonplace among athletes who failed gender verification tests. However, she refused to retire, leading to immense public scrutiny.

Finnish geneticist Albert de la Chapelle worked alongside Martínez-Patiño to appeal the decision to the IAAF. De la Chapelle protested sex testing in sports for years, arguing that the Barr body test incorrectly identified intersex women. Furthermore, he pointed out that the finding of the abnormal sex chromatin and exclusion of these athletes from women's sporting events violated their rights and caused psychological damage. With de la Chapelle's support, the IAAF reinstated Martínez-Patiño in 1988. Martínez-Patiño's case, and later advocacy, led to the elimination of chromosomal sex verification tests.

This method of testing was later abolished, as it was shown to be inconclusive in identifying maleness. The International Association of Athletics Federations ceased sex screening for all athletes in 1992, but retained the option of assessing the sex of a participant should suspicions arise. As well, in 1992, the IOC continued compulsory sex verification, but switched from the Barr body test to a Polymerase Chain Reaction (PCR) test to look for "male-related genetic material" through DNA samples collected from a buccal swab. This test was still subject to criticism and several medical associations opposed gender verification by the late 1990s. A resolution was passed at the 1996 International Olympic Committee (IOC) World Conference on Women and Health "to discontinue the current process of gender verification during the Olympic Games". The International Olympic Committee's board voted to discontinue the practice in June 1999. Chromosome testing was last performed at the Atlanta Olympic Games in 1996.

In the twenty-first century, increasing regulation of genetic testing—which is typically restricted to cases where there is medical benefit to the person concerned—makes it difficult or impossible to legally test athletes for non-medical purposes, such as sports eligibility, in many jurisdictions. Disqualification of athletes on genetic grounds can also violate various anti-discrimination laws. The World Medical Association has also called on medical professionals to avoid participating in genetic testing for sports eligibility purposes, calling it "not based on medical need" and "flagrant discrimination based on the genetic variation of female athletes".

=== Hormone testing ===
In 2006, the IAAF published a new Policy on Gender Verification. This allowed the organization to subject athletes to medical examinations by gynaecologists, endocrinologists, psychologists, internal medicine specialists, and experts on gender/transgender issues if suspicions arose of the athlete's gender. The IAAF clarified the sex determinations would not be made on the sole basis of laboratory-based results. Athletes were provided with the option to undergo medical and surgical procedures to compete if they had failed the gender verification testing. Furthermore, the 2006 Policy listed conditions that would not provide advantages over other females, thus allowing the athlete to compete. These included: androgen insensitivity syndrome (AIS), gonadal dysgenesis, Turner syndrome, congenital adrenal hyperplasia, androgen producing tumours, and polyendocrine metabolic ovarian syndrome (PMOS).

In August 2009, South African athlete Caster Semenya was subjected to mandatory sex verification testing at the request of the IAAF. In the wake of the Semenya case, testosterone testing was introduced to identify cases where testosterone levels were elevated above a particular level, termed hyperandrogenism, with national Olympics committees tasked by the IOC to "actively investigate any perceived deviation in sex characteristics".

In 2011, the IAAF released new protocols related to testosterone and hormone testing. The protocols rejected the terms "sex testing" and "gender verification" and placed emphasized importance on testosterone levels, as certain athletes would not be eligible to compete in the female category due to hormonal characteristics. The protocols claimed that hormone levels indicated the differences in athletic performance between men and women. Investigations under the protocol were prompted by suspicion and carried out through endocrinological blood tests. These tests determined whether androgen levels were below the male range of 10 nmol/L. If the athlete was over that level, more tests would be carried out to determine if she had androgen resistance, which means she would not have a competitive advantage. If the athlete was found to have a competitive advantage, under this protocol, she was ineligible to compete until undergoing IAAF-recommended treatment.

In association football, FIFA's current gender verification policy dates to 30 May 2011. In June 2012, in advance of the 2012 Summer Olympics, the IOC released IOC Regulations on Female Hyperandrogenism to address these cases. It includes the statement:

"Nothing in these Regulations is intended to make any determination of sex. Instead, these Regulations are designed to identify circumstances in which a particular athlete will not be eligible (by reason of hormonal characteristics) to participate in 2012 Olympic Games (OG) Competitions in the female category. In the event that the athlete has been declared ineligible to compete in the female category, the athlete may be eligible to compete as a male athlete, if the athlete qualifies for the male event of the sport."

Policies on hyperandrogenism were suspended following the case of Dutee Chand v. Athletics Federation of India (AFI) & The International Association of Athletics Federations, in the Court of Arbitration for Sport, decided in July 2015. Chand had been dropped from the 2014 Commonwealth Games at the last minute after the Athletic Federation of India stated that hyperandrogenism made her ineligible to compete as a female athlete. The ruling found that there was insufficient evidence that testosterone increased female athletic performance. In doing so the court immediately suspended the practice of hyperandrogenism regulation used by the IAAF and declared it void unless the organization could present better evidence by July 2017.

A study published in 2017 by Stéphane Bermon and Pierre-Yves Garnier analyzed 2,127 performances and hormone concentrations in male and female elite track and field athletes during the 2011 and 2013 Track and Field World Championships. When compared with women with lower levels of the hormone free testosterone (fT), women with the highest fT levels performed significantly better in the 400 m, 400 m hurdles, 800 m, hammer throw, and pole vault with margins of 2.73%, 2.78%, 1.78%, 4.53%, and 2.94%, respectively. Such a pattern was not found in any of the male athletic events. The study concluded that female athletes with high testosterone levels have a significant competitive advantage over those with low fT in 400 m, 400 m hurdles, 800 m, hammer throw, and pole vault.

==== Criticism ====
Scholars question whether any advantage should be considered "unfair" if it occurs naturally and outside the control of the athlete. For example, elite athletes have greater aerobic capacity and endurance in comparison to the general population. Philosopher Pam Sailors has argued that distinctions between individual and team sports, direct and indirect competition, contact and non-contact sports, and amateur and professional levels bear on when men and women might compete against one another, and that they point to a more nuanced approach to how competition is structured.

Furthermore, these cases have elicited criticism of the elite sporting system by showing clear vulnerability of women athletes to unnecessary medical interventions under duress, applied even though there was no evidence of cheating and no evidence of athletic advantage.[6][35] Moreover, the requirement to lower testosterone levels can have adverse impacts on athletes' health, as side effects may include: excessive thirst, urination and electrolyte imbalances, disruption of carbohydrate metabolism, headache, fatigue, nausea, hot flushes, and liver toxicity. Other commentators question the causal connection between testosterone and athletic capability, as some women who have high testosterone are prone to biological characteristics, such as obesity and short stature, that adversely impact athletic ability. As well, other factors, such as mitochondrial variations, acromegaly, a complete and balanced diet, and access to high level training at an early age, are said to be as relevant as testosterone, but are not considered.[25]

As with previous forms of sex testing, testosterone testing has been regarded by many as humiliating, unnecessary, unethical, and discriminatory. Katrina Karkazis, Rebecca Jordan-Young, Georgiann Davis and Silvia Camporesi argued that the new IAAF policies on hyperandrogenism in female athletes will not protect against breaches of privacy, will require athletes to undergo unnecessary treatment in order to compete, and will intensify "gender policing". In fact, high-performing female athletes show a rate of complete AIS much higher than the general population—which shows 1 in 20,000–50,000, compared with elite athletes' 1 in 429. They recommend that athletes be able to compete in accordance with their legal gender.

In November 2015, the IOC held a meeting to address both its hyperandrogenism and transgender policies. In regards to hyperandrogenism in female athletes, the IOC encouraged reinstatement of the IAAF policies suspended by the Court of Arbitration for Sport. It also repeated an earlier policy statement that, to "avoid discrimination, if not eligible for female competition the athlete should be eligible to compete in male competition". In February 2016, it was made known that the IOC would not introduce its own policies that would impose a maximum testosterone level for the 2016 Summer Olympics.

The cases of Dutee Chand and Caster Semenya were widely reported during the 2016 Rio Olympics. Immediately preceding the games, Genel, Simpson and de la Chapelle were again published in Journal of the American Medical Association stating:

One of the fundamental recommendations published almost 25 years ago ... that athletes born with a disorder of sex development and raised as females be allowed to compete as women remains appropriate. . . . With the passage of time and the recurring public spectacle of young women ... having their underlying biology indiscriminately scrutinized in the world media, it has become evident that the hyperandrogenism policies are no more salutary than earlier attempts to define sharp sex boundaries.

==== New rules in 2018 ====
On November 1 of 2018 the IAAF adopted new criteria regarding "Differences of Sexual Development" for female athletes competing in the following races: 400 m, 800 m, 1 mile, hurdles, and events that include a combination of these distances.

Athletes with testosterone levels equalling or exceeding 5 nmol/L or who are "androgen sensitive" and want to participate in above-mentioned events at the global level (including recognition for setting an international record) must legally be female or intersex, must get their testosterone levels below 5 nmol/L for six consecutive months and must ensure their levels stay below this level. This new regulation replaced all previous rules implemented regarding women with hyperandrogenism.

==== Medical opposition ====
The World Medical Association (WMA) demanded the withdrawal of these regulations arguing that they discriminate based on gender variation of female athletes. The Association also expressed concerns with physicians treating athletes with high levels of endogenous testosterone when the condition is not pathological.

=== Hormone testing in post-secondary education ===
In 2011, the NCAA made a statement of inclusivity for transgender athletes competing in college athletics, which included the following guidelines:

1. A trans male (FTM) student-athlete who has received a medical exception for treatment with testosterone for diagnosed Gender Identity Disorder or gender dysphoria and/or Transsexualism, for purposes of NCAA competition may compete on a men's team, but is no longer eligible to compete on a women's team without changing that team status to a mixed team. 2. A trans female (MTF) student-athlete being treated with testosterone suppression medication for Gender Identity Disorder or gender dysphoria and/or Transsexualism, for the purposes of NCAA competition may continue to compete on a men's team but may not compete on a women's team without changing it to a mixed team status until completing one calendar year of testosterone suppression treatment.

In 2021, however, the NCAA adjusted the previous policy of requiring one calendar year of testosterone suppressing therapy for transgender female athletes. Instead, now there is more frequent testosterone testing. The following passage describes these additional requirements:

Starting with the 2022-23 academic year, transgender student-athletes will need documented levels at the beginning of their season and a second documentation six months after the first. They will also need documented testosterone levels four weeks before championship selections. Full implementation would begin with the 2023-24 academic year.

More frequent hormone testing is seen in the IOC policy for sex verification. The motives behind these new implementations, according to the NCAA, is so that there is "consistency and further strengthens the relationship between college sports and U.S. Olympics".

Overall, the topic and policies of transgender athletes in post secondary sports is highly controversial. The amount of open transgender athletes competing in college athletics in the United States is extremely small, as only 32 athletes are reportedly transgender. But some of these specific examples grab the public's attention.

=== 20th century ===
- Perhaps the earliest known case is that of Stanisława Walasiewicz (aka Stella Walsh), a Polish athlete who won a gold medal in the women's 100 m at the 1932 Summer Olympics in Los Angeles, but who after her death in 1980 was discovered to have had partially developed male genitalia.
- Before the advent of sexual verification tests, German athlete Dora Ratjen competed in the 1936 Olympic Games in Berlin and placed fourth in the women's high jump. Ratjen later competed and set a world record for the women's high jump at the 1938 European Championships before tests by the German police concluded that Ratjen was a man. Ratjen was likely an intersex individual, based on the physician's description who conducted the examination. Though raised as a girl, Ratjen later took the name Heinrich Ratjen following an official registry change. This case played a great role in being the first sparking public interest in Sex Verification and the gender of athletes. Some speculate that the need for Ratjen's sex verification resulted from them competing for Germany when it was under the rule of Nazis - and Ratjen was forced to compete as a woman to ensure an Olympic medal for the nation.
- Other cases of sex verification at the 1936 Olympic Games involved track athletes Helen Stephens (U.S) and Stella Walsh (Poland), winning gold and silver in the 100m, respectively. Both displayed body characteristics that reflected the male body and were forced to participate in a physical exam. Neither tests resulted in either athlete being identified as a male.
- In the 1940s, all female athletes competing in top levels of their sports were then required to provide evidence of their sex by submitting a medical certificate prior to their competition.
- The Dutch sprinter Foekje Dillema was expelled from the 1950 national team after she refused a mandatory sex test in July 1950; later investigations revealed a Y-chromosome in her body cells, and the analysis showed that she probably was a 46,XX/46,XY mosaic female.
- Sisters Tamara and Irina Press won five track and field Olympic gold medals for the Soviet Union and set 26 world records in the 1960s. They abruptly ended their careers before the introduction of gender testing in 1966. Although both sisters were alleged to have been men or intersex, there is no evidence of an intersex condition in these cases.
- Polish athlete Ewa Kłobukowska, who won the gold medal in women's 4 × 100 m relay and the bronze medal in women's 100 m sprint at the 1964 Summer Olympics in Tokyo, is the first athlete to fail a gender test in 1967. She was found to have the rare genetic condition of XX/XXY mosaicism and was banned from competing in Olympic and professional sports.
- In 1967 the IOC disqualified the Austrian 1966 Female World Champion in downhill skiing, Erik Schinegger (then named Erika), from the 1968 Winter Games in Grenoble after determining Schinegger had internal male sex organs. Schinegger later transitioned to male.
- In 1986, Spanish hurdler Maria José Martínez-Patiño was dismissed and publicly shamed after failing a chromosomal test. She fought the ruling against her, arguing that she could not have a competitive advantage because her intersex variation resulted in her having no functional testosterone. Two years later, the IAAF gave Martínez-Patiño the green light to compete again. Her plight brought attention to the issue of gender testing, which helped lead to the end of mandatory tests a decade later.
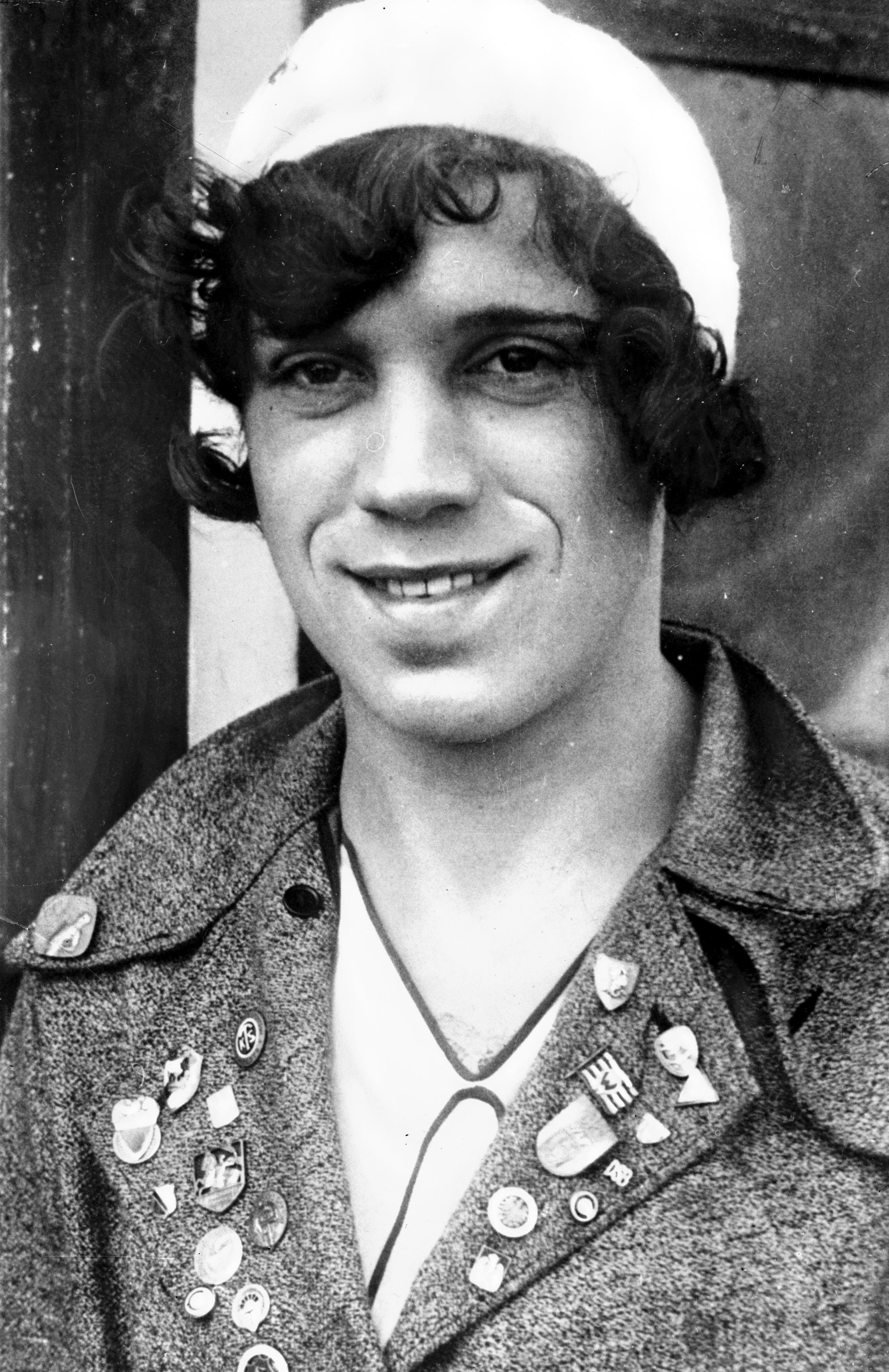
Stanisława Walasiewicz (aka Stella Walsh)

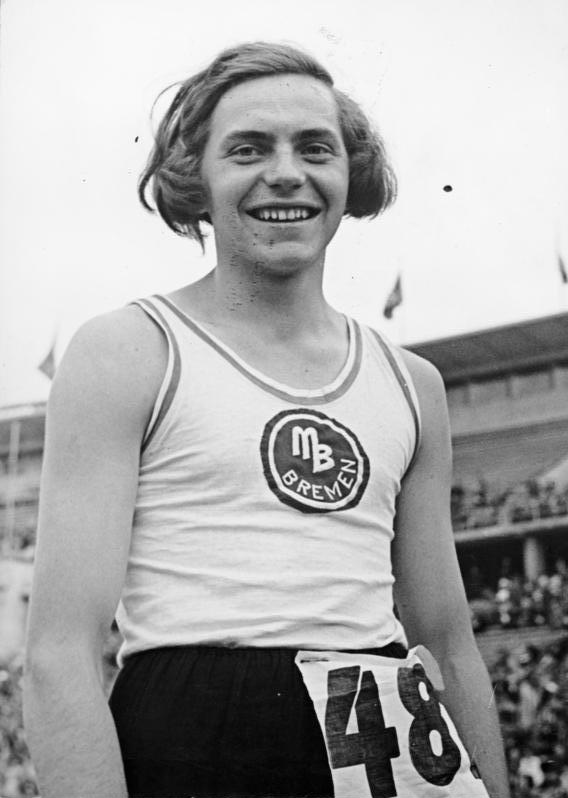
Dora Ratjen

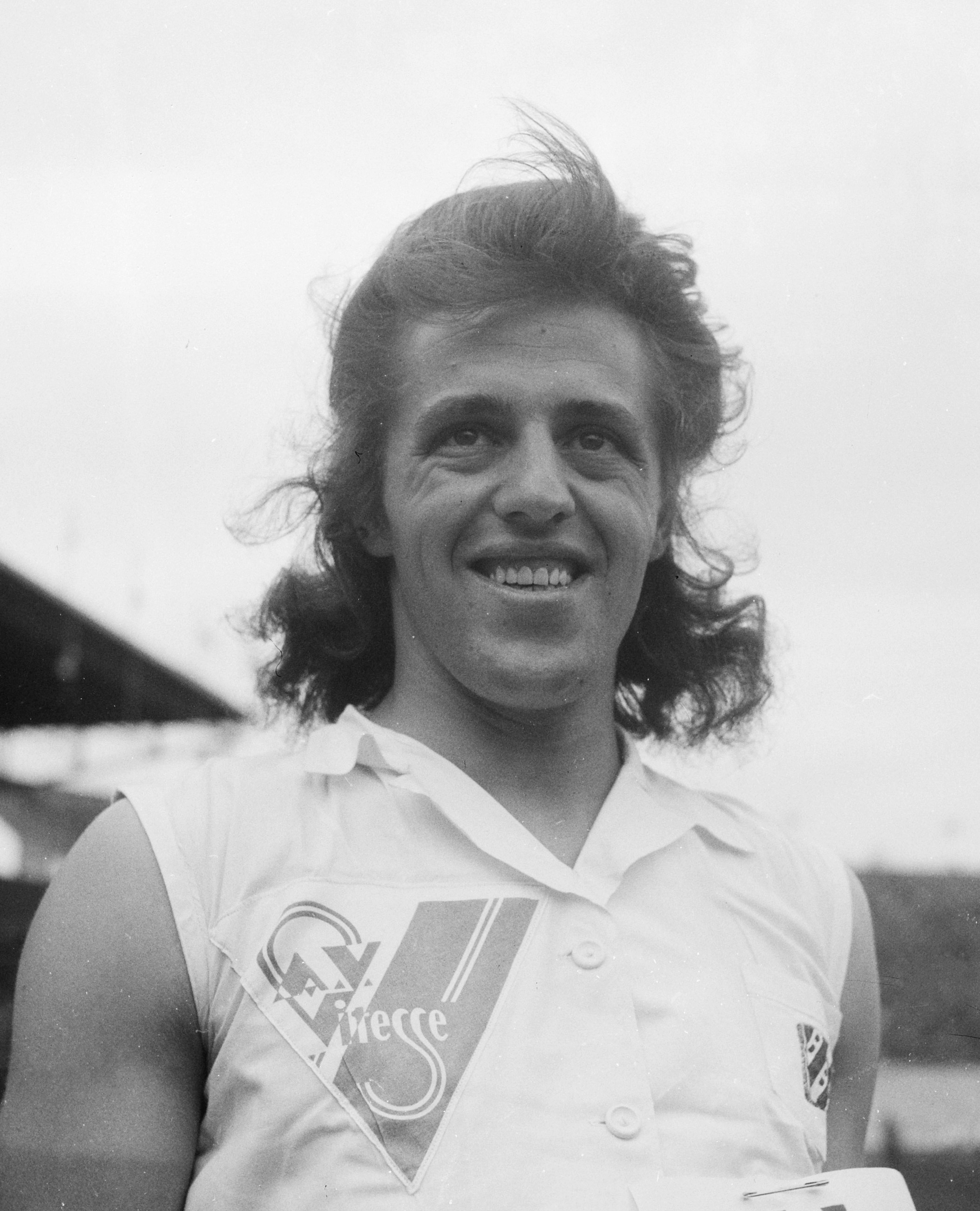
Foekje Dillema

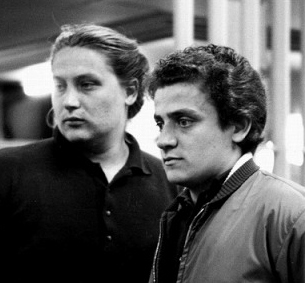
Sisters Tamara and Irina Press

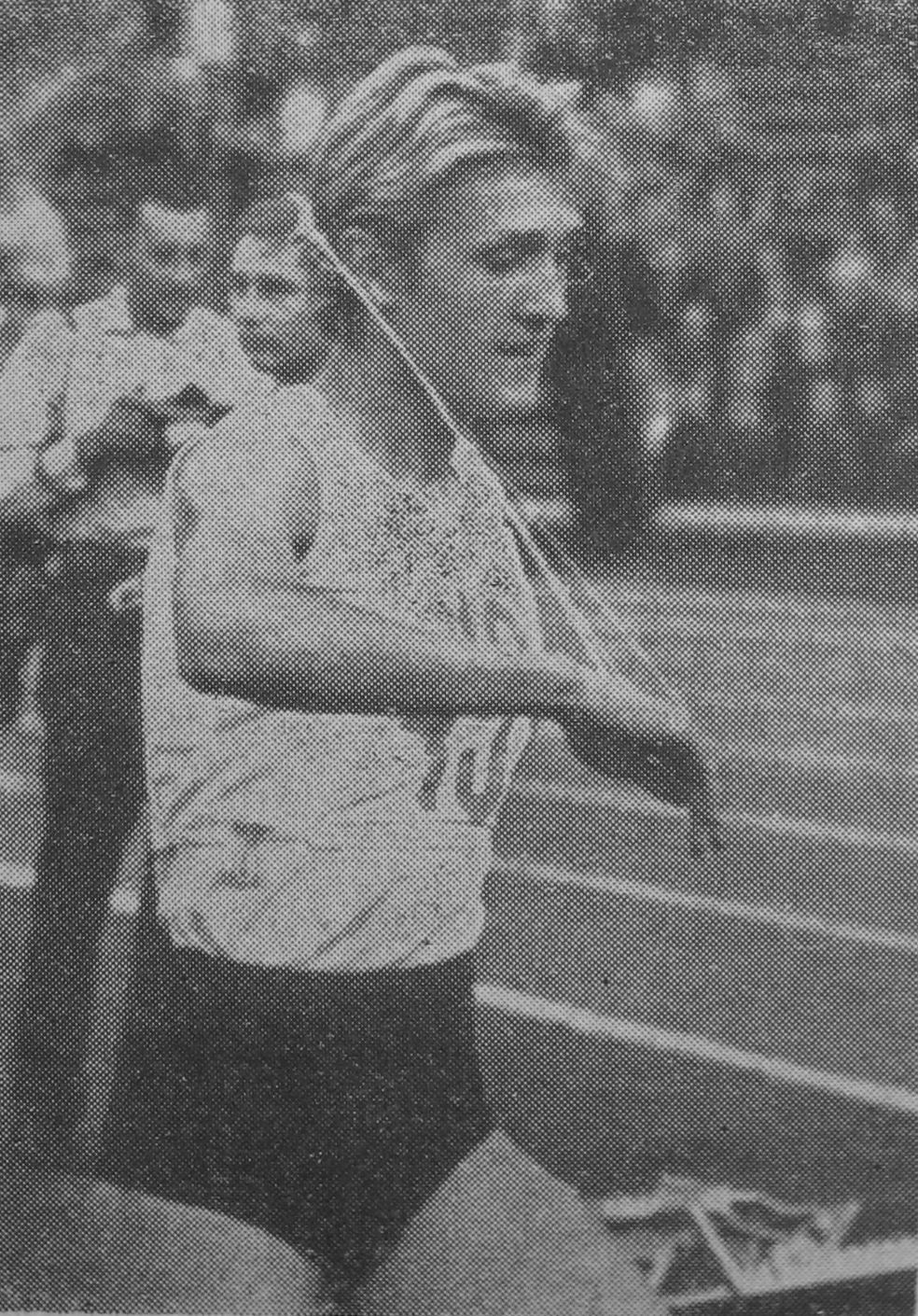
Ewa Kłobukowska

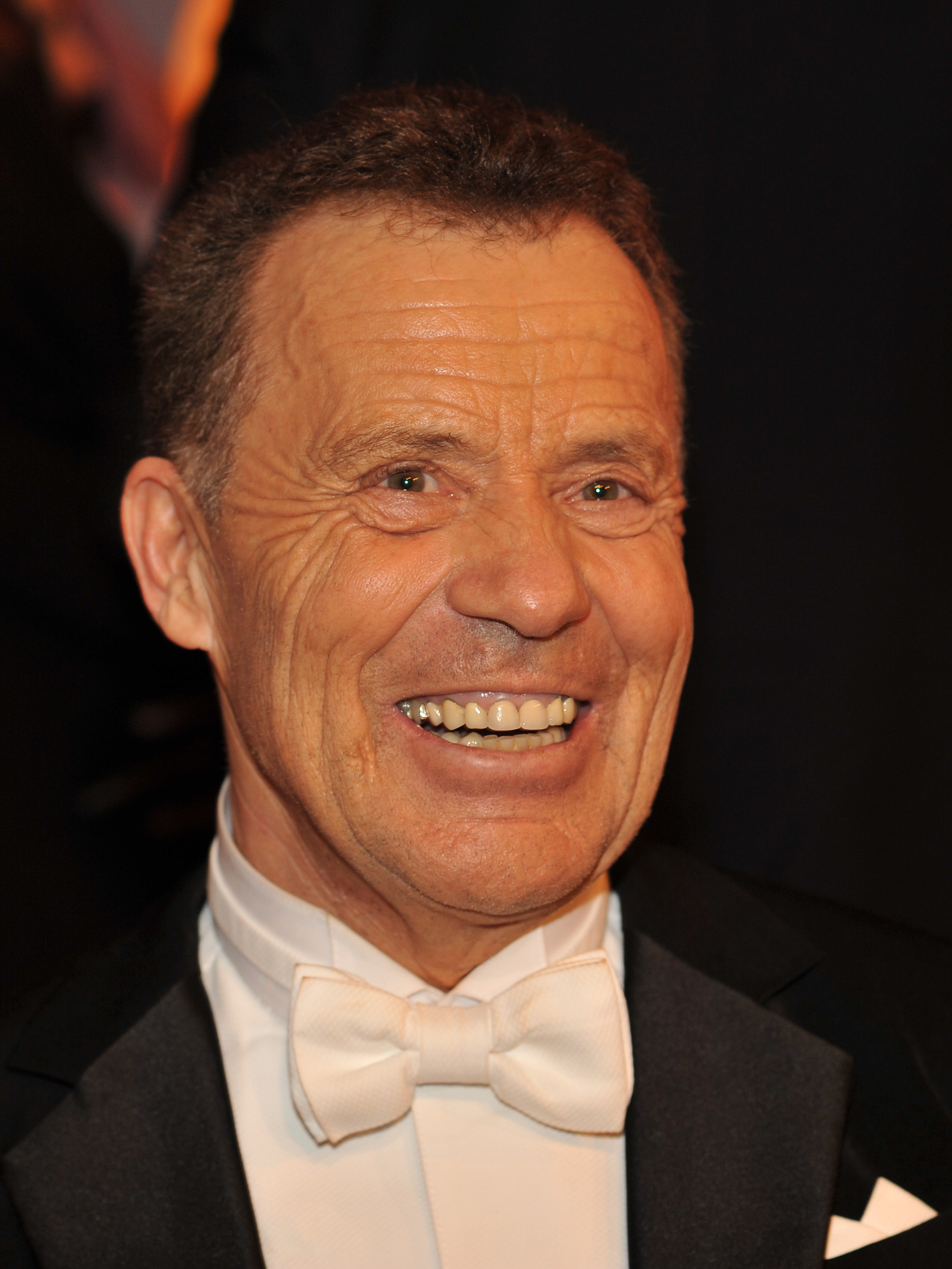
Erik Schinegger in 2014

=== 21st century ===
- In 2001, Indian athlete and swimmer Pratima Gaonkar committed suicide after disclosure and public commentary on her failed sex verification test.
- Indian middle-distance runner Santhi Soundarajan, who won the silver medal in 800 m at the 2006 Asian Games in Doha, Qatar, failed the sex verification test and subsequently stripped of her medal; leading her to attempt suicide.
- South African middle-distance runner Caster Semenya won the 800 meters at the 2009 World Championships in Athletics in Berlin. After her victory at the 2009 World Championships, it was announced that she had been subjected to gender testing. The IAAF confirmed that Semenya had agreed to a sex-testing process that began in South Africa and would continue in Germany. On 6 July 2010, the IAAF confirmed that Semenya was cleared to continue competing as a woman. The results of the gender testing were never officially released for privacy reasons. In 2018, the IAAF announced new rules that once again prevented Semenya from running. This included lowering the allowable level of testosterone from 10nmol/L to 5nmol/L.
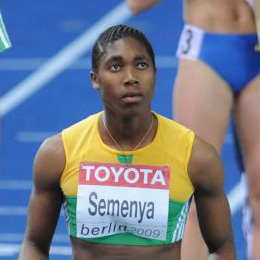
  South African woman athlete Caster Semenya was initially cleared to continue competing after sex testing by the IAAF, but in 2018 the IAAF introduced rules that banned her once again.
- In 2012, after female Indian track athlete Pinki Pramanik was accused by a female roommate of rape and later charged, she was gender tested and declared a male although she and other medical experts dispute the claims. Pramanik disagreed with these results and police ordered a separate government-led test as part of the trial. The SSKM Government Hospital declared the results to be inconclusive. The Court then directed a chromosome pattern test.
- Four unnamed women athletes from poor rural regions, were screened and identified with DSD in France. They were given treatment for DSD and gender related surgeries to normalize them more with their identity (including a gonadectomy and optional surgery that did not impact requirements to compete as female) The female athletes were discovered to have an undiagnosed intersex trait during testosterone testing; the case was first published in 2013.
- Dutee Chand was dropped from the 2014 Commonwealth Games at the last minute after the Athletic Federation of India stated that hyperandrogenism made her ineligible to compete as a female athlete. Chand took a case to the Court of Arbitration for Sport and won an interim judgment in mid-2015. In February 2016, it was made known that the IOC would not impose a maximum testosterone level for the 2016 Summer Olympics. In June 2016, Chand qualified to compete in the 100 metres race at the Summer Olympics. Notably, all three medalists in the women's 800 m showed intersex characteristics, the 4th, 5th, and 6th placers expressed disappointment and concern.
- In 2018, Caster Semenya brought criticisms from the WMA against the IAAF to the CAS. The Court upheld the IAAF's new regulations, as they deemed the differential treatment proportionate. The CAS stated the treatments the relevant athletes must undergo did not outweigh the objective of protecting fair competition in the female category.
- In 2019, World Athletics opted to set a maximum testosterone level for the 400, 800, and one-mile women's races in the 2020 Summer Olympics. Caster Semenya, an intersex woman who won gold in the women's 800 m in both the 2012 and 2016 Olympics, filed to appeal the decision, which would effectively ban her from competing in middle-distance races due to hyperandrogenism. She subsequently attempted to compete in the women's 5k, but failed to qualify by the June deadline.
- In 2020, Human Rights Watch reported that Ugandan runner, Annet Negesa, was misinformed about hormone testing by the IAAF. The IAAF referred her to a French medical clinic, which specialized in intersex conditions. There she underwent more testing and surgery to remove her internal testes. However, before the surgery, Negesa was told it would be "like an injection" and was not informed of the extent of the procedure.

== Sex verification of men ==
Sex verification is not conducted on athletes competing in the male category, and little data are available on their chromosomes or hormone profiles. However, a post-competition study of 693 elite athletes by Healy et al., published in 2014, found significant differences along many variables. The authors found that:

16.5% of men had low testosterone levels, whereas 13.7% of women had high levels with complete overlap between the sexes.

Using these data, Scientific American estimated that "almost 2 percent" of male competitors had testosterone levels in the typical female range. The study authors also stated that average lean body mass differences might account for performance differences between sexes.

== Transgender athletes ==
In November 2015, the IOC held a meeting to address both its transgender and hyperandrogenism policies. In regard to transgender athletes it stated that transgender athletes cannot be excluded from an opportunity to participate in sporting competition. Transgender athletes who identified themselves as female would be allowed to compete in that category as long as their testosterone levels were below 10 nmol/L for at least 12 months prior to the competition. There would be no restrictions on transgender athletes who identify and compete as male since their condition is disadvantageous. In 2018, the IAAF lowered the maximum level to 5 nmol/L.

Transgender athletes who wish to compete in the female category are allowed to do so if their testosterone levels are in accordance with the required levels. However, the IOC stated that requiring surgical anatomical changes as a requirement for participation may be considered a violation of human rights. Athletics may for some transgender people engage them within greater society in affirming ways. However, others opposed to the participation of transgender athletes on women's teams state that the argument is unsound. Athletes who have faced opposition include Mianne Bagger, Martine Delaney (who participated in "Soccer Tasmanian's women's league") and Lana Lawless.

- Professional tennis player Renée Richards, a transgender woman, was barred from playing as a woman at the 1976 US Open unless she submitted to chromosome testing. She sued the United States Tennis Association and in 1977 won the right to play as a woman without submitting to testing.
- American collegiate athlete Lia Thomas is a transgender woman. In 2022, Thomas achieved top honours in swimming the women's 500-yard freestyle, as she was crowned first place in her final NCAA competition.

In March 2026, the IOC announced that eligibility for the women’s category at the Olympic Games would be limited to athletes identified as female at birth beginning with the 2028 Summer Olympics in Los Angeles. The eligibility would be determined by a one-time sex test.

== See also ==
- Gender
- Intersex human rights
- Sexual differentiation
- Transgender people in sports
- Testosterone regulations in women's athletics
- Sex verification and intersex athletes at the Olympic Games
- LGBT issues at the Olympic and Paralympic Games
- 2024 Summer Olympics boxing controversy
