= United States partial military ban on intersex people =

United States military ban on some intersex people

(DoDI) 6130.03, 2018, section 5, 13f and 14m

United States Department of Defense
- Long title: Department of Defence Instruction 6130.03: Section 5; subheader 13 Female Genitalia System paragraph f and subheader 14 Male Genitalia System paragraph m
- Citation: DOD INSTRUCTION 6130.03 MEDICAL STANDARDS FOR APPOINTMENT, ENLISTMENT, OR INDUCTION INTO THE MILITARY SERVICES
- Enacted by: United States Department of Defense

Summary
- Barring of people with ovotesticular disorder of sex development, "pseudohermaphroditism" and pure gonadal dysgenesis from serving in the United States military

Keywords
- Intersex, military service, Armed Forces of the United States, Urological disorders
- Status: Current legislation

The (DoDI) 6130.03, 2018, section 5, 13f and 14m is the writing which bars persons with "true hermaphroditism" (ovotesticular disorder of sex development), "pseudohermaphroditism" and "pure gonadal dysgenesis" from serving in the United States Armed Forces. The three are all intersex conditions and are as of now considered to be medically incompatible with military service in the United States. "DoDI" stands for "Department of Defense Instruction," the 6130.03 instruction concerns "Medical Standards for Appointment, Enlistment, or Induction in the Military Services" in the Armed Forces of the United States. Section 5 focuses on disqualifying conditions of the male and female reproductive system, on the female page the subheader 13 and paragraph f name true hermaphroditism, pseudohermaphroditism and pure gonadal dysgenesis specifically, and on the male page the subheader 14 and paragraph m also name exactly true hermaphroditism, pseudohermaphroditism and pure gonadal dysgenesis, respectively. There is no differentiation made between males and females with these conditions. Many doctors, medical professionals and intersex advocates find the terms hermaphroditism to be outdated and stigmatized, therefore it and its derivative words are seldom used in the 2000s, with the word hermaphrodite itself being considered a slur when used against a human.

== Statement ==
- SECTION 5: DISQUALIFYING CONDITIONS

13.
—Female Genitalia System:

f.

History of major abnormalities or defects of the genitalia, such as hermaphroditism, pseudohermaphroditism, or pure gonadal dysgenesis.

Page 24

14.
—Male Genitalia System:

m.

History of major abnormalities or defects of the genitalia such as hermaphroditism, pseudohermaphroditism, or pure gonadal dysgenesis.

Page 26

== Context ==
"True hermaphroditism," which is clinically known as ovotesticular disorder of sex development, is a medical term for an intersex state in which a human is born with both testicular and ovarian tissue. Often one or both gonads is an ovotestis which contains both types of tissue. It is similar in some ways to mixed gonadal dysgenesis but the conditions can be distinguished histologically. The condition has several effects on the body, one of which is imbalanced hormonal output, which is why it is currently considered a disqualifying condition for military service in the United States.

"Pseudohermaphroditism" on the other hand is an old clinical term for a person that is born with primary sex characteristics of one sex but develops the secondary sex characteristics that are different from what would be expected on the basis of the gonadal tissue (ovary or testis). Use of the term "pseudohermaphroditism" can be problematic, and is now widely considered redundant. Because of this, the language still used by the armed forces has fallen out of favor in the 21st century due to misconceptions and pejorative connotations associated with the term hermaphrodite.

Several militaries, whether they accept intersex people (such as Israel) or not, use different wording. The website Military.com clumps all three conditions together as "hermaphroditism" on their list of conditions which disqualify one from service.

== History ==
=== Background ===
Barring of intersex persons with ovotesticular disorder of sex development and "pseudohermaphroditism" like states dates back to at least as far back as 1956. Despite this, John F. Patton of the Office of the Surgeon General and Center of Military History of the U.S. Army, wrote in 1988 that "Lesser degrees of these abnormalities, however, were obviously overlooked or regarded as compatible with military service." Mentions of gonadal agenesis as an obstacle in military servie has been recorded since the early 1970s if not before.

=== Developments ===
The guideline with the current wording was first conceived in 2010 and implemented in 2011. At first it was not addressed if persons who have had surgeries to address their genital abnormalities were acceptable or not but later updates added in notes about people also being barred if they had medical interventions done. In 2013 guidelines stated that "a history of, or current manifestations of, personality disorders, disorders of impulse control not elsewhere classified, transvestism, voyeurism, other paraphilias, or factitious disorders, psychosexual conditions, transsexual, gender identity disorder to include major abnormalities or defects of the genitalia such as change of sex or a current attempt to change sex, hermaphroditism, pseudohermaphroditism, or pure gonadal dysgenesis or dysfunctional residuals from surgical correction of these conditions render an individual administratively unfit," which while specifying that only unsuccessful corrective surgeries for the conditions rendered someone unfit for service also lumped together disorders of sex development (DOSD) with gender identity, fetishes, mental illness, neuroatypicality, personality disorders and paraphilias in the same level of disqualification, which is not consistent or optimal for rules of enlistment. The 2016 amendments to the 6130.03 guidelines to allow transgender people to serve did not touch on intersex people whatsoever and their situation remained unchanged. At the time the location of the writing was at "Enclosure 4, 14f. and 15r," here it was listed as "major abnormalit[y] or defect of genitalia." The amendments made for transgender people were motivated by changes in the medical and psychological community, and while the use of the word hermaphroditism was criticized as archaic and medically outdated there was no major push by the larger LGBT community to have it corrected nor was any effort made on the part of the military to consider having it reworded.

== Effectiveness ==
The Consensus Study Report from the Board on Children, Youth, and Families (part of the DOD's Military Family Readiness System) in 2019 notes that despite the restriction it is very possible for someone whose genitalia have been surgically modified to comply with social norms due to these conditions to enter the military completely undetected.

== See also ==
- Intersex rights in the United States
- Sexual orientation and gender identity in the United States military
- Transgender people and military service
  - Transgender personnel in the United States military
