= Taylor Muhl =

American singer/songwriter

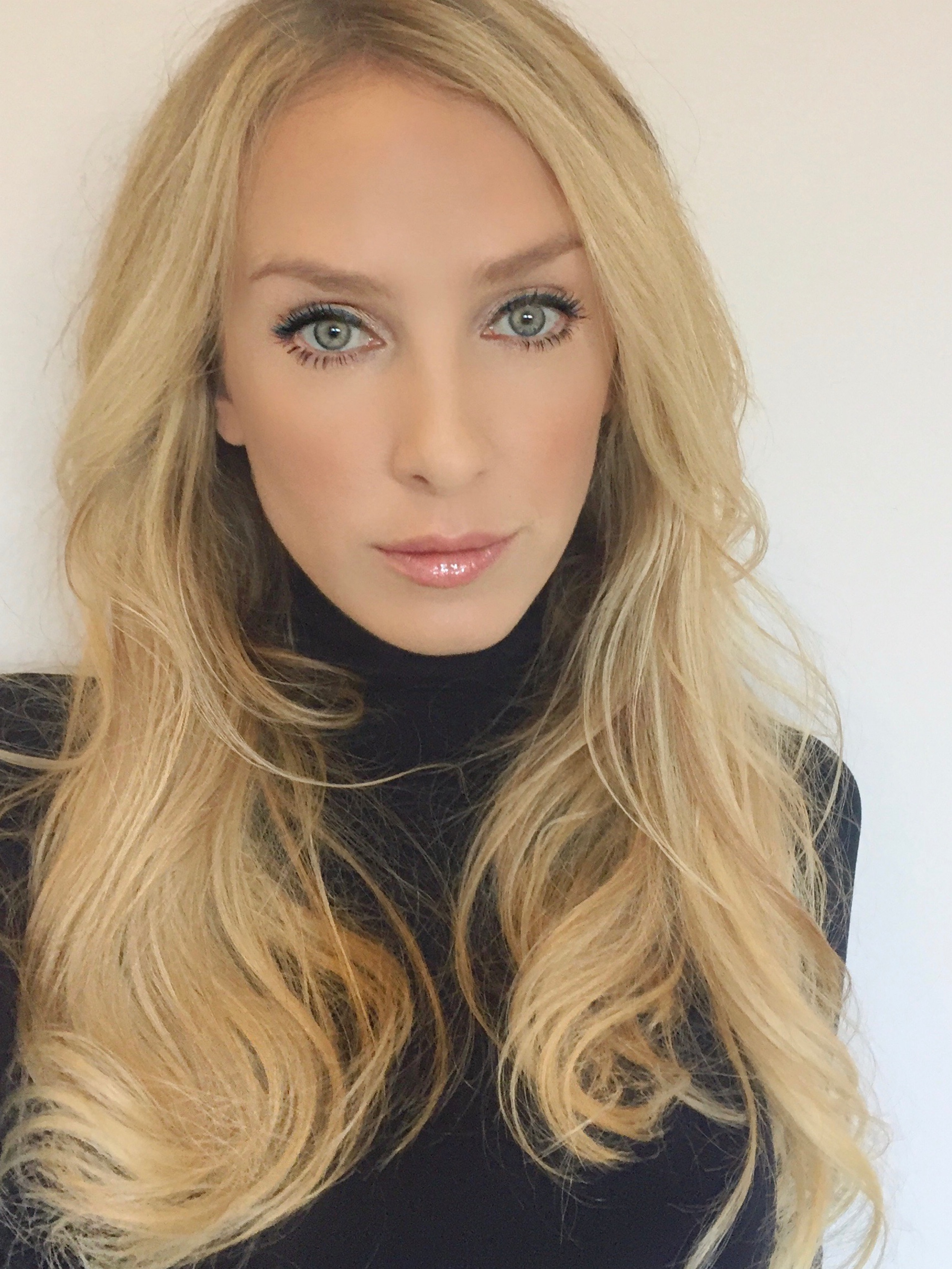
- Born: November 5, 1983 (age 42); Hollywood, California, U.S.
- Occupation: Singer/model/advocate
- Known for: Entertainer with chimerism
- Height: 5 ft 7 in (170 cm)
- Relatives: Edward Muhl (grandfather)
- Website: taylormuhl.com

Taylor Alexis Muhl (born November 5, 1983) is an American singer-songwriter, model, dancer, and chimerism awareness advocate.

Muhl is the only surviving child of Eric and Sandra (Alex) Muhl, though she was conceived with a fraternal twin sister. Since birth, Muhl's body has been distinguished by the fact that the left and right sides of her torso are two conspicuously different colors, with the interface running right down the midline of her torso, both front and back. For many years Muhl, her family, and doctors believed the darker coloration on the left side of her torso was simply a very large birthmark. When Muhl was a young adult, it was finally discovered that she was a rare example of human chimerism.

== Early life ==
Muhl's mother was unaware she was initially pregnant with fraternal twin sisters. At an early stage of the pregnancy, the two eggs fused, which left Muhl carrying her twin sister's genes in her own body. This caused Muhl to be born with a genetic condition called human chimerism. Not all cases of chimerism can be seen or detected from outside the body, but in Muhl's case it can be observed from an unusual physical trait. The coloration of Muhl's torso is split down the center by two clearly different colors of skin pigmentation, the darker color being Muhl's twin sister's DNA/cells. Muhl and publicists describe this as making Muhl "her own twin."

As a teen and young adult, Muhl faced autoimmune challenges and continued to go undiagnosed by every doctor she saw. She was told by doctors that the physical trait on her torso was just a birthmark. Chimerism in humans is rarely detected, with only 30–100 cases documented worldwide. Muhl was only diagnosed in 2009, after being seen by a doctor who had previous experiences in genetics and medical rarities.

== Career ==
Muhl was originally trained as a dancer, and has since become a singer, songwriter, and model as well. A music video of her work was released in 2015.

Muhl is the granddaughter of Hollywood mogul Edward Muhl who was VP in charge of production at Universal Studios from the 1950s–1970s. The elder Muhl oversaw movies such as Psycho, The Birds, To Kill A Mockingbird, Pillow Talk, Spartacus, and others.

Given the high visibility and need for publicity in these lines of work, Muhl was initially scared that her chimerism could have a negative impact on her career opportunities; thus, she kept it a secret outside of friends and family upon being diagnosed. Muhl had a change of heart in 2016 and decided to go public, making her the first person in the entertainment business to go public with this condition. Muhl has said that she hopes to inform, help, and inspire anyone experiencing differences or health challenges.

== Spreading awareness of human chimerism ==
Muhl's first public appearance in spreading awareness of chimerism was in 2017 on the talk show The Doctors. After appearing on the show, Muhl's segment went viral, resulting in millions of views on YouTube and hundreds of shares online. That happening is what made Muhl a public awareness advocate for chimerism, body positivity, and autoimmune deficiencies.

Muhl has now appeared in more interviews, TV appearances, and documentaries. She has been reported on by HuffPost and many others. In 2018, Muhl was a featured guest on Megyn Kelly Today, where she shared with the audience how her particular case of chimerism is linked to autoimmune deficiencies, as her two sets of genes are not fully compatible with one another.

== Other examples of chimerism ==
- Lydia Fairchild
- Karen Keegan
- Foekje Dillema
