= Edward Muhl =

American film executive (1907–2001)

- Born: Edward Ellsworth Muhl; February 17, 1907; Richmond, Indiana
- Died: April 22, 2001 (age 94); Los Angeles, California
- Years active: 1927–1973
- Employer: Universal Studios (1927–1973)
- Spouse: Barbara Bean (m. 1926; died 1995)
- Relatives: Erica Muhl (daughter); Taylor Muhl (granddaughter)

Edward Ellsworth Muhl (February 17, 1907 – April 22, 2001) was an American businessman and executive best known for serving as the head of production for Universal Pictures from 1953 until his retirement in 1973.

According to one writer, he played key roles in some of the studio's most important decisions. Muhl's contributions range from the technical (he was instrumental in persuading studio heads to shoot most of their films in Technicolor rather than the cheaper black-and-white) to the purely business (he made the deal that allowed MCA to purchase Universal in the early 1960s).

== Career ==
Muhl began his career at Universal in 1927 in the cost accounting department. He became studio business manager and remained in the role until 1934 when he became head of the legal department, despite not being a lawyer. He moved into production in 1936. When William Goetz and Leo Spitz's International Pictures merged with Universal to form Universal-International in 1947, Muhl was appointed general manager of studio operations.

In 1953, Muhl was appointed general production executive under Goetz. Later that year he became vice president in charge of production for the studio, replacing Goetz and Spitz, who had run Universal for seven years.

Muhl oversaw a period of expansion for Universal. The studio enjoyed a successful run of films, primarily comedies (such as those starring Doris Day) and melodramas. When MCA Inc. took over Universal in 1962, other executives shared responsibility for production although the phrase "Edward Muhl In Charge Of Production" appeared on the new Universal logo starting in 1963, a throwback to an industry practice that had largely faded since the 1940s. He was also credited with influential support of the films of Douglas Sirk and Ross Hunter, as well as supporting the blacklisted writer Dalton Trumbo's right to screenplay credit on Spartacus albeit censoring the film diminishing the historical importance of the slave turned rebel leader.

In 1970, he shifted to make independent productions for the studio. At the time, he was the longest serving production head in recent Hollywood history.

== Personal life ==
Muhl's granddaughter is Taylor Muhl. She is a singer/songwriter known as a public advocate for human Chimerism.

== Death ==
Muhl died on April 22, 2001, at the age of 94 in his Los Angeles residence, surrounded by his family. His death was not reported in the mainstream press at the time.

== Selected films produced in the Muhl period ==
- Touch of Evil (1958)
- Operation Petticoat (1959)
- Imitation of Life (1959)
- Lover Come Back
- That Touch of Mink (1962)
- Man's Favorite Sport (1964)
- American Graffiti (1973)
