= Ovotestis =

Gonad with features of both testicles and ovaries

An ovotestis is a gonad with both testicular and ovarian aspects. In humans, ovotestes are an infrequent anatomical variation associated with ovotesticular syndrome. The only mammals where ovotestes are not characteristic of an infrequent variation are moles, wherein females possess ovotestes along with a masculinized clitoris. These ovotestes in nonpregnant female moles secrete eight times as much testosterone as the ovotestes of pregnant moles. In invertebrates that are normally hermaphroditic, such as most gastropods (snails and slugs) in the clade Eupulmonata, an ovotestis is a common feature of the reproductive anatomy.

In mice, ovotestes are structured such that the central region is testicular tissue while the poles both contain ovarian tissue. Experiments involving the SOX9 gene, which is initiated by the SRY region of the Y chromosome, have shown the gene's requirement for testicular differentiation from the presence of ovotestis formation within XX Sox9 trangenic mice. (6) Ovotestis within B6-XYPOS mice allow for gonadal development research within the same tissue to take place in ways previously unavailable.

== In gastropods ==
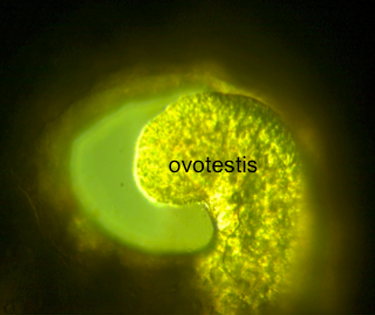
The ovotestis of the freshwater snail Biomphalaria glabrata. The area around the ovotestis is the hepatopancreas. (10× magnification)

An ovotestis or hermaphroditic gland (Latin: glandula hermaphroditica), is found as normal anatomical feature in the reproductive system of some gastropods including such species as the land snail Cornu aspersum.

== People with ovotestis ==
- Cheryl Chase (activist)
- Foekje Dillema
- Anton Krzyzanowski
- Aleksa Vulović

== See also ==
- Cornu aspersum
- Ovotesticular syndrome
- Intersex
- Hermaphrodite
- Gynandromorph
