= Lydia Fairchild =

American woman who exhibits chimerism

Lydia Fairchild (born 1976) is an American woman who exhibits chimerism, having two distinct sets of DNA among the cells of her body. She was pregnant with her third child when she and the father of her children, Jamie Townsend, separated. When Fairchild applied for enforcement of child support in 2002, providing DNA evidence of Townsend's paternity was a routine requirement. While the results showed Townsend to certainly be their father, they seemed to rule out her being their mother.

Fairchild stood accused of fraud by either claiming benefits for other people's children, or taking part in a surrogacy scam, and records of her prior births were put similarly in doubt. Prosecutors called for her two children to be taken away from her, believing them not to be hers. As time came for her to give birth to her third child, the judge ordered that an observer be present at the birth, ensure that blood samples were immediately taken from both the child and Fairchild, and be available to testify. Two weeks later, DNA tests seemed to indicate that she was also not the mother of that child.

A breakthrough came when her defense attorney, Alan Tindell, learned of Karen Keegan, a chimeric woman in Boston, and suggested a similar possibility for Fairchild and then introduced an article in the New England Journal of Medicine about Keegan. He realized that Fairchild's case might also be caused by chimerism. As in Keegan's case, DNA samples were taken from members of the extended family. The DNA of Fairchild's children matched that of Fairchild's mother to the extent expected of a grandmother. They also found that, although the DNA in Fairchild's skin and hair did not match her children's, the DNA from a cervical smear test did match. Fairchild was carrying two different sets of DNA, the defining characteristic of chimerism.

== Other examples of chimerism ==
- Taylor Muhl
- Karen Keegan

== See also ==
- Mater semper certa est
