= Nancy Navalta =

Filipino track and field athlete and coach

Personal information
- Nationality: Filipino
- Home town: Pangasinan

Sport
- Sport: Track and field
- Event(s): 100m, 200m
- Retired: 1996

Nancy Navalta is a Filipino retired track and field athlete and coach. She is known for being a prospect of the national team for her feats in the Palarong Pambansa in the 1990s. Her career ended in 1996, after she was found out to be intersex.

== Early life and education ==
Hailing from the province of Luna, La Union, Navalta was born intersex, was assigned female at birth and was raised as a girl. Navalta is the eldest among six children. She was originally into volleyball, playing the sport in fourth grade but shifted to athletics after beating one of the best runners in her town.

She helped her family in their livelihood by carrying rocks which she later attributes as the cause for her physique in the absence of prior formal training as a competitive athlete.

Navalta studied at the Coseca Colleges in San Fernando, La Union and pursued a degree in criminology

== Career ==
Navalta started her sporting career at age 18. She started competing at the Palarong Pambansa, the national games for student-athletes in the Philippines, in 1991. In that edition held in Iloilo, Navalta failed to win an event.

Navalta featured in the next editions of the student games as well as the inaugural Philippine National Games (PNG) in 1994.She won the 100-m dash event in the first PNG. She also won the women's 100m and 200m events in the 1993 Palarong Pambansa in Isabela.

She began to set records but question on her gender began to arise due to her having a "flat chest, muscled physique, and a wispy mustache". Her feats made her a prospect for the national team and the "next Lydia de Vega". She had undergone a "sex verification" test in late 1994, and a second one in March 1995. The results of the more recent test was never disclosed to the public to officials.

The Philippine Athletics Track and Field Association (PATAFA) bared Navalta from competing in the women's division from any local and international tournaments in the lead up to the 1996 Palarong Pambansa in Soccsksargen. Majority of the 15 regions at the time threaten a boycott if Navalta would be allowed to do so. Ilocos coach failed to convince her to compete in the men's division. She also attempted to join in the PNG of that year.

She was named part of the Philippines' delegation for the 1996 Summer Olympics in Atlanta after attaining a qualifying time. However her career ended after she learned about her intersex condition in 1996. She was quoted to have said that she had "strong male hormones".

Navalta recalled clocking 10.08 seconds during a trainings session for the women's 100m in Baguio which was faster than eventual 1996 Olympic gold medalist Gail Devers' 10.94 seconds.

== Post-retirement ==
With the help of the Samson family, who owns the University of Luzon Navalta finished her criminology studies in the institution. By the early 2000s, she was already a coach based in La Union and Pangasinan.

== In popular culture ==
Navalta's biography has been a subject of an episode of ABS-CBN's Maalaala Mo Kaya released in 2004. In 2011, her life was featured in the documentary program Tunay na Buhay in GMA Network.
