= Ovotesticular syndrome =

Gonad containing both ovarian and testicular tissue

Ovotesticular Syndrome
- Other names: Ovotesticular disorder, OT-DSD
- Specialty: Obstetrics and gynaecology, endocrinology

Ovotesticular syndrome (also known as ovotesticular disorder or OT-DSD) is a rare congenital condition of atypical sexual differentiation where an individual is born with both ovarian and testicular tissue. It is one of the rarest disorders of sex development, with an incidence rate of approximately one in 100,000 live births. Commonly, one or both gonads is an ovotestis containing both types of tissue. Although it is similar in some ways to mixed gonadal dysgenesis, the conditions can be distinguished histologically. Ovotesticular syndrome was previously called true hermaphroditism.

People with ovotesticular syndrome are considered intersex.

== Ovotesticular cords and follicles ==
Ovotesticular cords and ovotesticular follicles are novel hybrid structures found in ovotesticular syndrome, first documented in 2023. Limited research exists on these structures.

== Terminology ==
=== Hermaphrodite ===
The term hermaphrodite means a single organism that can produce both male and female gametes (sperm and ova), which is extremely rare in humans.

In the past, prior to the 2006 Chicago consensus statement, ovotesticular syndrome was medically classed as true hermaphroditism, which is now considered outdated, and is also considered misleading or stigmatizing by some medical and advocacy groups. Some intersex people have chosen to reclaim the word hermaphrodite and use it as a self-descriptor (such as in Hermaphrodites Speak! and Hermaphrodites with Attitude).

=== Disorder ===
Pathologizing language, including the term disorders of sex development, can also sometimes be seen as controversial or stigmatizing, due to the claim that it frames the simultaneous presence of ovarian and testicular tissue and corresponding hormonally induced sex characteristic development in a healthy individual as disordered rather than a natural variation of human sexual development, which may lead to nonconsensual cosmetic surgery or medical alterations on otherwise healthy children who are too young to consent to such cosmetic interventions.

== Presentation ==
=== Physical ===
Some people with ovotesticular syndrome may appear phenotypically normal or present with no obvious symptoms. Other times the following may be found:

==== General appearance ====
- Presence or development of mixed sex characteristics, androgynous phenotype
- Feminization of a boy/man or masculinization of a girl/woman, especially at puberty
- Heterochromia, heterotrichosis, or atypical areas of skin pigmentation (especially following blaschko's lines) in cases originating from mosaicism or chimerism

==== Hormones ====
- High androgens in a woman or low androgens in a man
- High estrogen in a man or low estrogen in a woman
- Low progesterone in a woman or high progesterone in a man
- Elevated leutinizing hormone (LH), follicle stimulating hormone (FSH), or gonadotropin-releasing hormone (GnRH) (triggered by a feedback loop of low sex hormones, as seen in some forms of gonadal failure, calling for more GnRH which then calls for more LH and FSH)
- Elevated anti-müllerian hormone (AMH) in a girl/woman (may be from testicular tissue producing AMH, or—if puberty age or older—from arrested follicular development under the influence of androgens, resulting in high follicle counts and increased follicular AMH production)

==== Secondary sex characteristics ====
- Failure to develop secondary sex characteristics at puberty, weak development of secondary sex characteristics in general, or development of simultaneous male and female secondary sex characteristics
- Enlargement of one or both breasts in men (gynecomastia) (present in 75% of cases) or underdeveloped breasts in women (micromastia)
- Hirsutism or male pattern hair loss in women, or lack of terminal hair growth in men
- Voice deepening in women or lack of voice deepening in men (puberphonia)

==== Primary sex characteristics ====
- Clitoromegaly, microphallus, or ambiguous genitalia
- Incompletely closed urogenital opening or persistent urogenital sinus
- Hypospadias, chordee, or incomplete labialscrotal fusion
- Cryptorchidism or other gonad anomalies such as testicles or ovaries that appear unusually large or small, atypically placed, or asymmetrical (which may in some cases be an ovotestis)
- Arrested follicular development (especially if androgen production is high), may appear with presence of multiple follicular cysts in an ovary (or ovotesti), gonad may appear similar to polycystic ovarian morphology (PCOM) or have patchy distribution of arrested follicle clusters in some areas but not others (due to mixed tissue type in an ovotestis)
- Ovotesticular cords or ovotesticular follicles
- Simultaneous presence of both wolffian and müllerian development, may be partial or full development
- Prostate or wolffian anomalies such as prostate hypoplasia or degradation/absence of either of the vas deferens, seminal vesicles, or epididymis (largely due to the necessity of testicular production of testosterone and dihydrotestosterone in maintaining and developing the prostate and wolffian structures in utero)
- Uterine or müllerian anomalies such as unicornuate uterus, uterine hypoplasia, broad ligament abnormalities or absence, or fallopian tubes that are degraded or missing (largely due anti-müllerian hormone being produced by testicular tissue in utero causing degradation of müllerian structures)
- Anomalies of the vagina or vulva such as vaginal hypoplasia, vaginal atresia, or labia minora that are absent or underdeveloped (largely due to testicular production of testosterone and dihydrotestosterone controlling the fusion and masculinization of the labialscrotal folds, genital tubercle, urethra, and lower 1/3 of the vaginal canal/urogenital sinus including the vaginal introitus, in addition to estrogen greatly influencing the pubertal development of the labia minora)
- Atypical anogenital distance (representative of prenatal androgen exposure)

==== Menstrual ====
- Hematuria, hematospermia, or hematometra
- Amenorrhea, delayed menarche, oligomenorrhea, or other menstrual irregularities

==== Reproductive ====
- Infertility such as azoospermia, anovulation, or primary ovarian insufficiency
- Sexual dysfunction such as anorgasmia, erectile dysfunction, anejaculation, or retrograde ejaculation

=== Cognitive ===
Studies on the limited amount of cases show the condition does not cause cognitive impairment.

=== Psychological ===
Individuals with ovotesticular syndrome may struggle with minority stress, social avoidance, loneliness, social isolation, agoraphobia, anxiety, depression, shame, body image issues, gender identity issues, sexual dysfunction, self esteem issues, dissociation, or feelings of being disconnected from their body. They may struggle with medical mistrust and healthcare avoidance. Early experiences with nonconsensual childhood medical interventions, repeatedly having their body or genitalia inspected, being photographed for case studies, repeated surgeries, vaginal dilation, or being deceived by medical personnel and caregivers can be traumatizing and these experiences are sometimes claimed to be a form of psychological abuse, childhood sexual abuse, conversion therapy, unethical human experimentation, or medical torture, all of which can cause both PTSD and C-PTSD.

=== Gender ===
People with ovotesticular syndrome are more likely to experience gender dysphoria or gender identity related issues than the average person. People with ovotesticular syndrome may identify as intersex or intergender, and are more likely than the average population to identify as nonbinary/gender nonconforming, transgender, or queer. They are more likely to identify as nonbinary/gender nonconforming or queer than they are to identify as transgender.

== Variations ==
=== Gonads ===
Ovotesticular anatomy can be seen in the following variations:

- Bilateral - both ovarian and testicular tissue appear on both sides.
- Unilateral - on one side there is an ovotestis (a gonad with both ovary and testicle tissue), and the other side has either ovary tissue or testicular tissue, not both.
- Lateral - both testicular and ovary tissue are present, but on opposite sides.
- Indeterminate - it is known that the condition is present, but it is not evident where the ovary and testicular tissue is located.

==== Comorbid polygonadism ====
Polygonadism (the presence of more than two gonads) has been observed in an extremely limited number of cases.

=== Karyotypes ===
An 46,XX karyotype is the most common (55-80% of cases); most individuals with this form are SRY negative. A 46,XX/,46XY karyotype appears in 20-30% of cases and an 46,XY karyotype in 5-15% of cases. Presence of 46,XX/46,XY chimerism has been recorded in between 13% and 30% of cases. Some degree of mosaicism is present in about 25% of cases. Encountered karyotypes include 46,XX/46,XY, 47,XXY, or 46,XX/47,XXY or XX & XY with SRY or other gene mutations, mixed chromosomal anomalies or hormone deficiency/excess disorders.

== Causes ==
There are several ways in which this may occur.

- It can be caused by the division of one ovum, followed by fertilization of each haploid ovum and fusion of the two zygotes early in development
- Single gene mutations.
- Alternately, an ovum can be fertilized by two sperm followed by trisomic rescue in one or more daughter cells.
- Two ova fertilized by two sperm cells will occasionally fuse to form a tetragametic chimera, if one male zygote and one female zygote fuse.
- It can be associated with a mutation in the SRY gene.
- Etc.
  - Mitotic or meiotic errors: Can cause sex chromosome mosaicism
  - Double fertilization: Can result in 46XX/46XY chimerism, which occurs when an X sperm and a Y sperm fertilize an ovum
  - Fusion of two ova: Can result in 46XX/46XY chimerism, which occurs when one male zygote and one female zygote fuse
  - Mutation in the SRY gene: Can be associated with ovotesticular syndrome
  - Mutation of downstream autosomal genes: Can explain SRY-negative ovotesticular syndrome
  - Mutation/duplication or deletion of an X-linked locus: Can explain SRY-negative ovotesticular syndrome
  - Depression of autosomal testis-determining genes: Can explain 46,XX true hermaphroditism

• Only 3 reports exist attributing specific cases of the condition to some form of duplication of the SOX9 gene; making this an incredibly rare cause.

== Prevalence ==
Ovotesticular syndrome represents 5% of all disorders of sex development. It is one of the rarest disorders of sex development, with an incidence rate of approximately one in 100,000 live births. By 1991 approximately 500 case studies had been performed.

== Diagnosis ==
Diagnosis of ovotesticular syndrome is usually done with imaging (such as ultrasound, CT scan, or MRI) and gonadal biopsy.

== Fertility ==
The gonad most likely to function is the ovary. The ovotestes show evidence of ovulation in 50% of cases. Spermatogenesis has only been observed in solitary testes and not in the testicular portions of ovotestes. According to a 1994 study, spermatogenesis has only been proven in two cases. In one of the two cases, a phenotypically male individual with XX,46/XY,46 mixture had fathered a child. It has been estimated that 80% of cases could be fertile as females with surgery.

=== Documented cases of fertility ===
There are extremely rare cases of fertility in humans with ovotesticular syndrome.

In 1994, a study on 283 cases found 21 pregnancies from 10 individuals with ovotesticular syndrome, while one allegedly fathered a child.

As of 2010, there have been at least 11 reported cases of fertility in humans with ovotesticular syndrome in the scientific literature, with one case of a person with XY-predominant (96%) mosaic giving birth. All known offspring have been male. There has been at least one case of an individual being fertile as a male.

=== Self-fertilization ===
There is a hypothetical scenario, in which it could be possible for a human to self-fertilize. If a human chimera is formed from a male and female zygote fusing into a single embryo, giving an individual functional gonadal tissue of both types, such self-fertilization is feasible. It is known to occur in non-human species where hermaphroditic animals are common and has been observed in a rabbit. However, no such case of functional self-fertilization or "true bi-sexuality" has been documented in humans.

== Society and culture ==
=== Military ===
==== United States ====
Having ovotesticular syndrome can make one inadmissible for service in the United States Armed Forces if undiagnosed and untreated. Waivers are possible on a case by case basis.

=== Religion ===
==== Judaism ====
In Judaism a person with ovotesticular syndrome may be considered an androgynos and subject to different religious laws regarding things like marriage, inheritance, Halakhic status, and eligibility for priestly rites. In some cases this includes a requirement to adhere to both male and female laws and practices simultaneously.

==== Christianity ====
In Christianity a person with ovotesticular syndrome might have historically been called a eunuch or hermaphrodite. Unlike Judaism and Islam, Christianity always requires the person of indeterminate sex to be classed as male or female and lacks any classification resembling a third gender. The sex assignment and religious laws regarding things like marriage or priesthood are decided on an individual basis, but always result in a male or female categorization.

==== Islam ====
In Islam a person with ovotesticular syndrome may be considered a khunthā or khuntha al-mushkil and subject to different religious laws regarding things like marriage and inheritance.

== Legal cases ==
=== M.C. v. Aaronson ===
The U.S. legal case of M.C. v. Aaronson, advanced by intersex civil society organization interACT with the Southern Poverty Law Center, was brought before the courts in 2013. The child in the case was born in December 2004 with ovotestes, initially determined as male, but subsequently assigned female and placed in the care of South Carolina Department of Social Services in February 2005. Physicians responsible for M.C. initially concluded that surgery was not urgent or necessary and M.C. had potential to identify as male or female, but, in April 2006, M.C. was subjected to feminizing medical interventions. According to the Encyclopedia Britannica, "The reconstruction of female genitalia (via surgeries such as a vaginoplasty or clitoridectomy) was more readily performed than the reconstruction of male genitalia, so ambiguous individuals often were made to be female." He was adopted in December 2006. M.C. identified as male at the time the case was brought, at age eight. The defendant in the case, Dr. Ian Aaronson, had written in 2001 that "feminizing genitoplasty on an infant who might eventually identify herself as a boy would be catastrophic".

The defendants sought to dismiss the case and seek a defense of qualified immunity, but these were denied by the District Court for the District of South Carolina. In January 2015, the Court of Appeals for the Fourth Circuit reversed this decision and dismissed the complaint, stating that, it did not "mean to diminish the severe harm that M.C. claims to have suffered" but that in 2006 it was not clear that there was precedent that the surgery on a sixteen-month-old violated an established constitutional right. The Court did not rule on whether or not the surgery violated M.C.'s constitutional rights.

State suits were subsequently filed. In July 2017, it was reported that the case had been settled out of court by the Medical University of South Carolina for $440,000. The university denied negligence, but agreed to a "compromise" settlement to avoid "costs of litigation."

== Factitious disorder ==
Of all disorders of sex development or intersex variations, ovotesticular syndrome due to chimerism appears to be one of the most frequently fabricated stories among people fraudulently claiming a disorder of sex development or intersex variation. Impersonation can have lasting negative effects on diagnosis, care, understanding, cultural representation, and access to peer support for persons with ovotesticular syndrome.

== People with ovotesticular syndrome ==
- Cheryl Chase
- Foekje Dillema
- Anton Krzyzanowski
- Aleksa Vulović
- Xie Jianshun

== See also ==
- Ovotestis
- Development of the gonads
- Sexual differentiation in humans
- List of homologues of the human reproductive system
- Disorders of sex development
- Intersex (biology)
- Intersex
- Intergender
- Sex characteristics
- Sex characteristics (legal term)
- Androgynos (Judaism)
- Androgynos (Mythology)
- Androgyny
- Hermaphrodite
- Hermaphrodite (slur)
