= Kunming University =

Public college in Kunming, Yunnan, China

Coordinates: 24°58′38″N 102°47′40″E

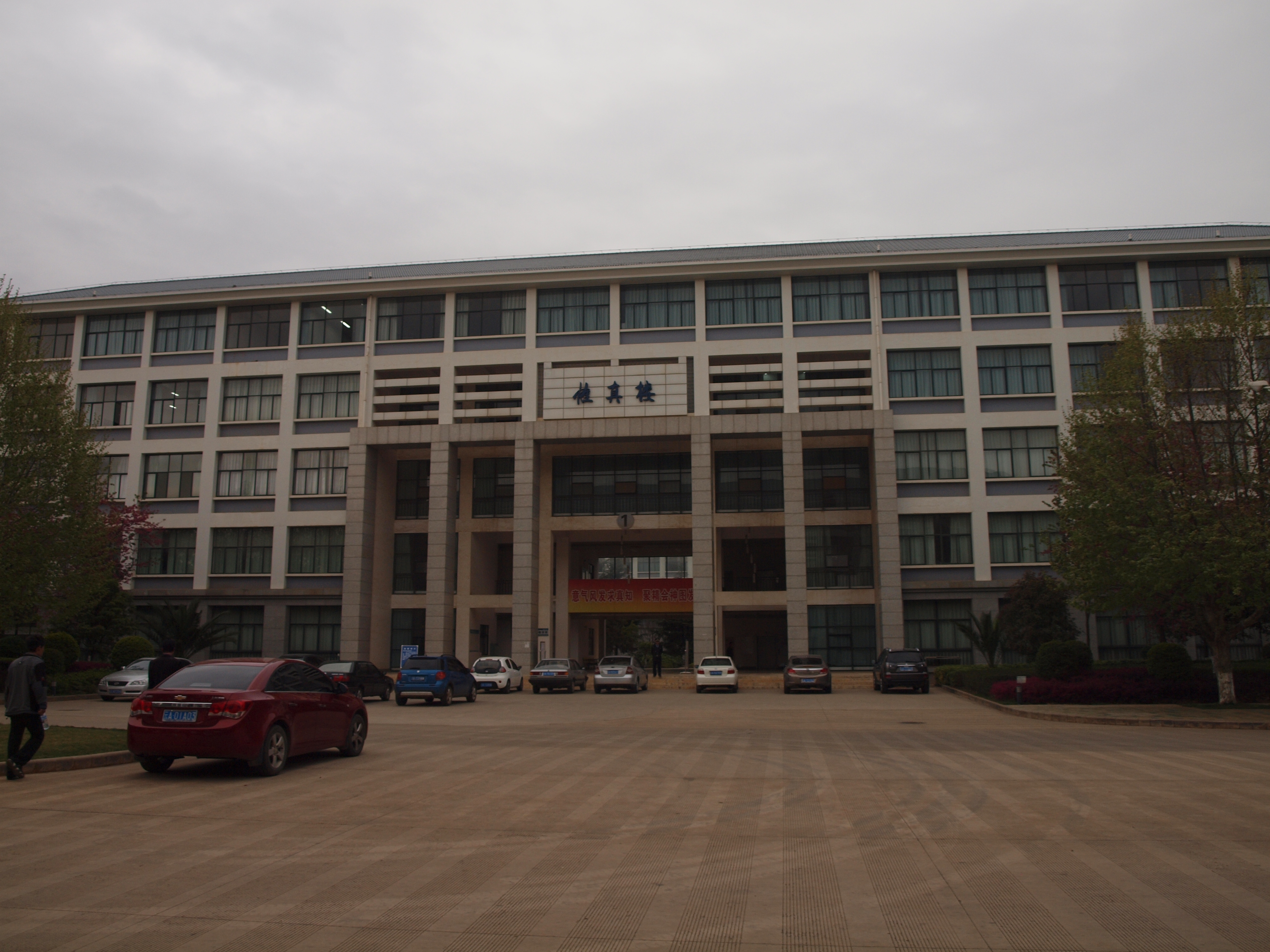
Kunming University entrance

Kunming University (Chinese: 昆明学院) is a provincial public undergraduate college in Kunming, Yunnan, China. It is affiliated with the Yunnan Provincial People's Government. The college's establishment was approved by the Ministry of Education in 2006 (19 years ago).
