= Foekje Dillema =

Dutch track and field athlete (1926–2007)

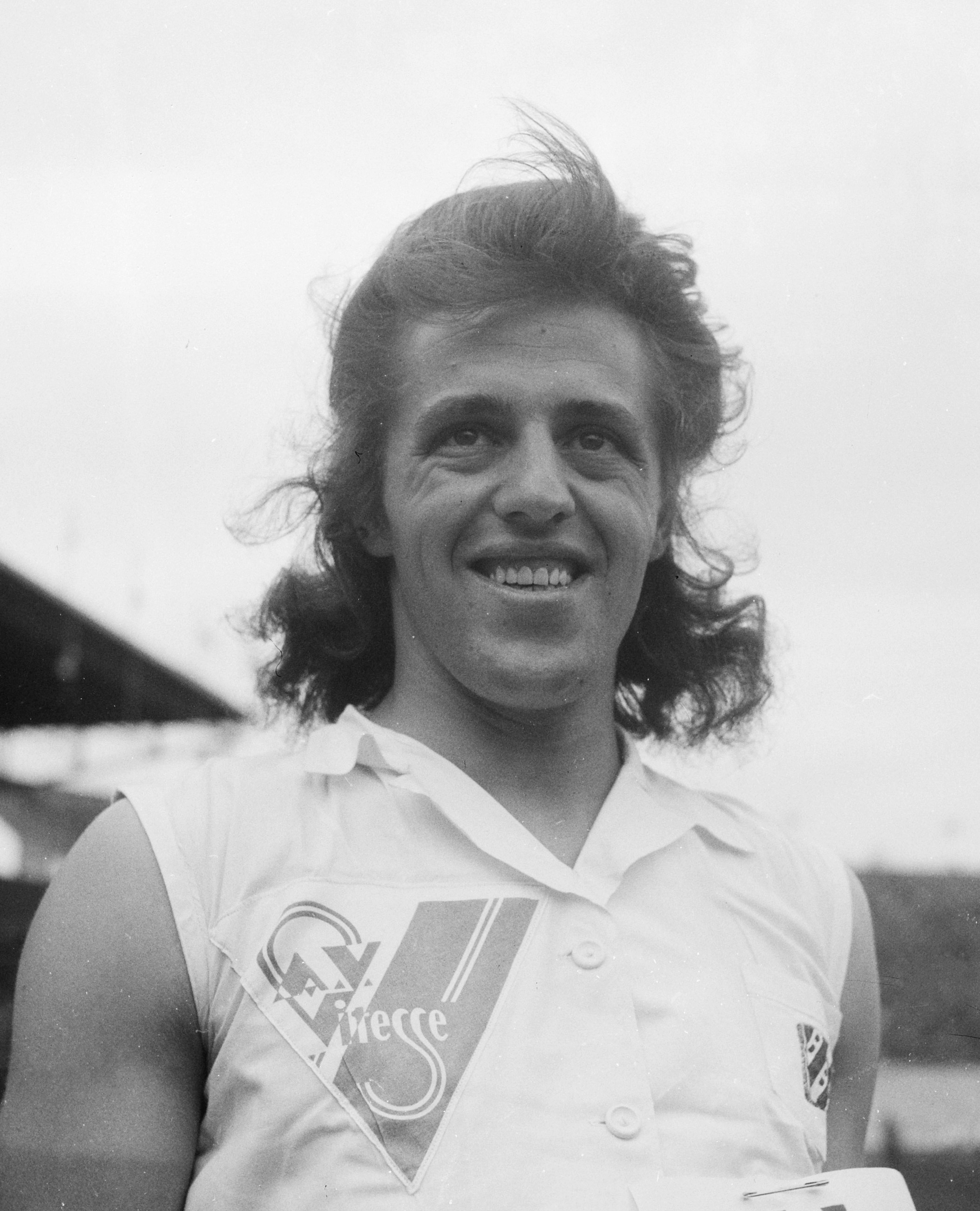
- Foekje Dillema in 1949

Personal information
- Born: 18 September 1926 Burum, Netherlands
- Died: 5 December 2007 (aged 81) Kollum, Netherlands

Sport
- Sport: Track and field
- Events: 100 m, 200 m
- Debuted: 13 June 1948
- Retired: 13 July 1950

Foekje Dillema (pronounced [ˈfukjə ˈdɪləmaː]; 18 September 1926 – 5 December 2007) was a Dutch track and field athlete. She competed in sprinting where she was a rival of Fanny Blankers-Koen. When she refused a sex verification test at age 24, she was banned from competition by the International Association of Athletics Federations in 1950. After her death, it was determined that she was an intersex person.

== Early life ==
Foekje Dillema was born on 18 September 1926 in Burum, Friesland in the Netherlands.

She started running at the age of twelve.

== Career ==
=== 1948 ===
On 13 June 1948, Dillema debuted in Marsum, where the 21-year-old ran the 100 metres in 13 s.

About a month later, she competed in the Dutch Championships in Eindhoven, where she ran 12.5 s in the 100 metres, resulting in 4th place in the heats, and 26.2 s in the 200 metres, resulting in 4th place in the final.

=== 1949 ===
In 1949, Dillema did not compete in the Dutch Championships due to an injury of her thigh.

Dillema was named "athlete of the match" in 1949 after winning the 100 metres and 200 metres race during a tournament in London. She was an important rival for another Dutch athlete Fanny Blankers-Koen, who won four gold medals during the 1948 Summer Olympics.

=== 1950 ===
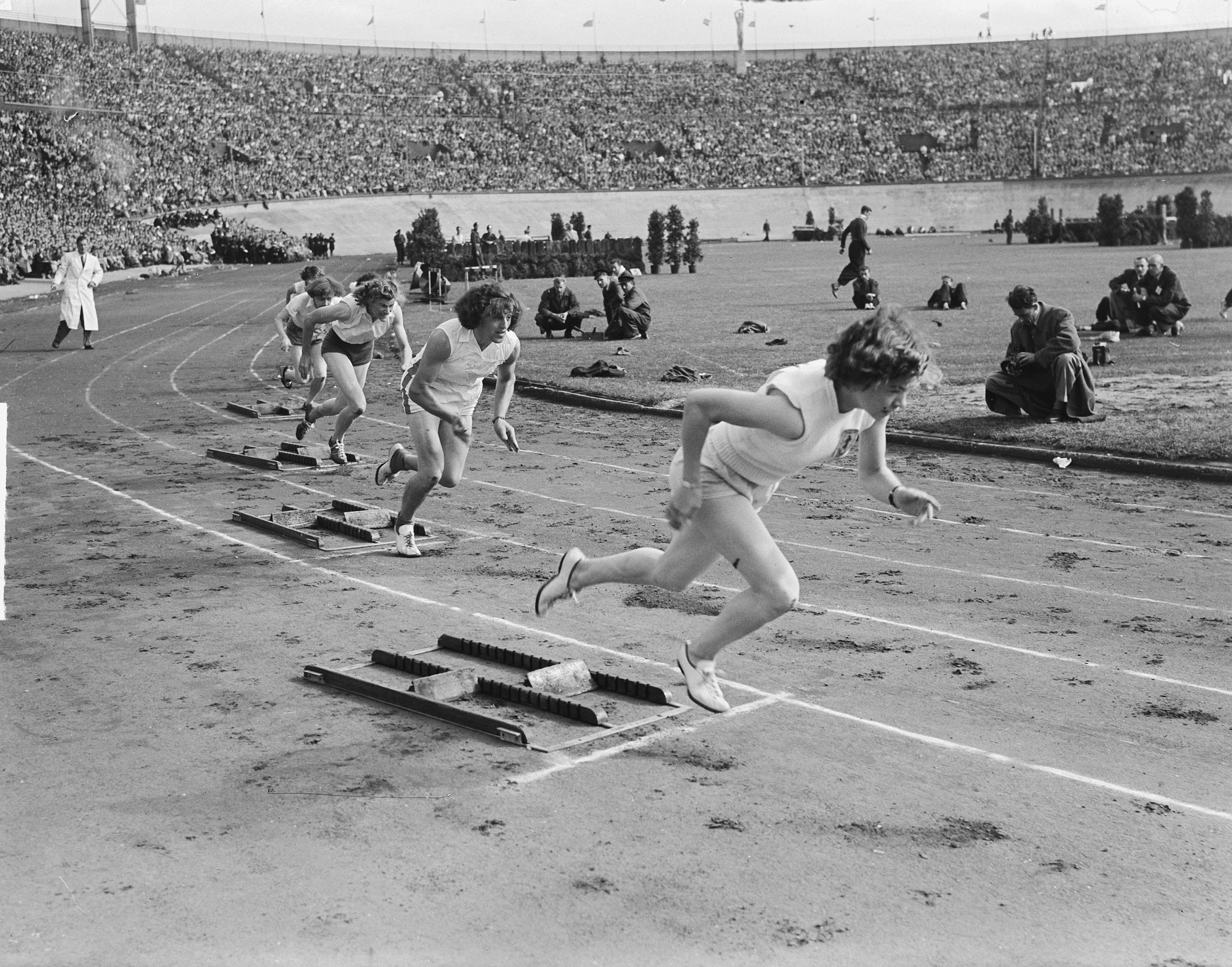
Dillema (second from the right) at the start of the 200 metres in Amsterdam on 18 June 1950.

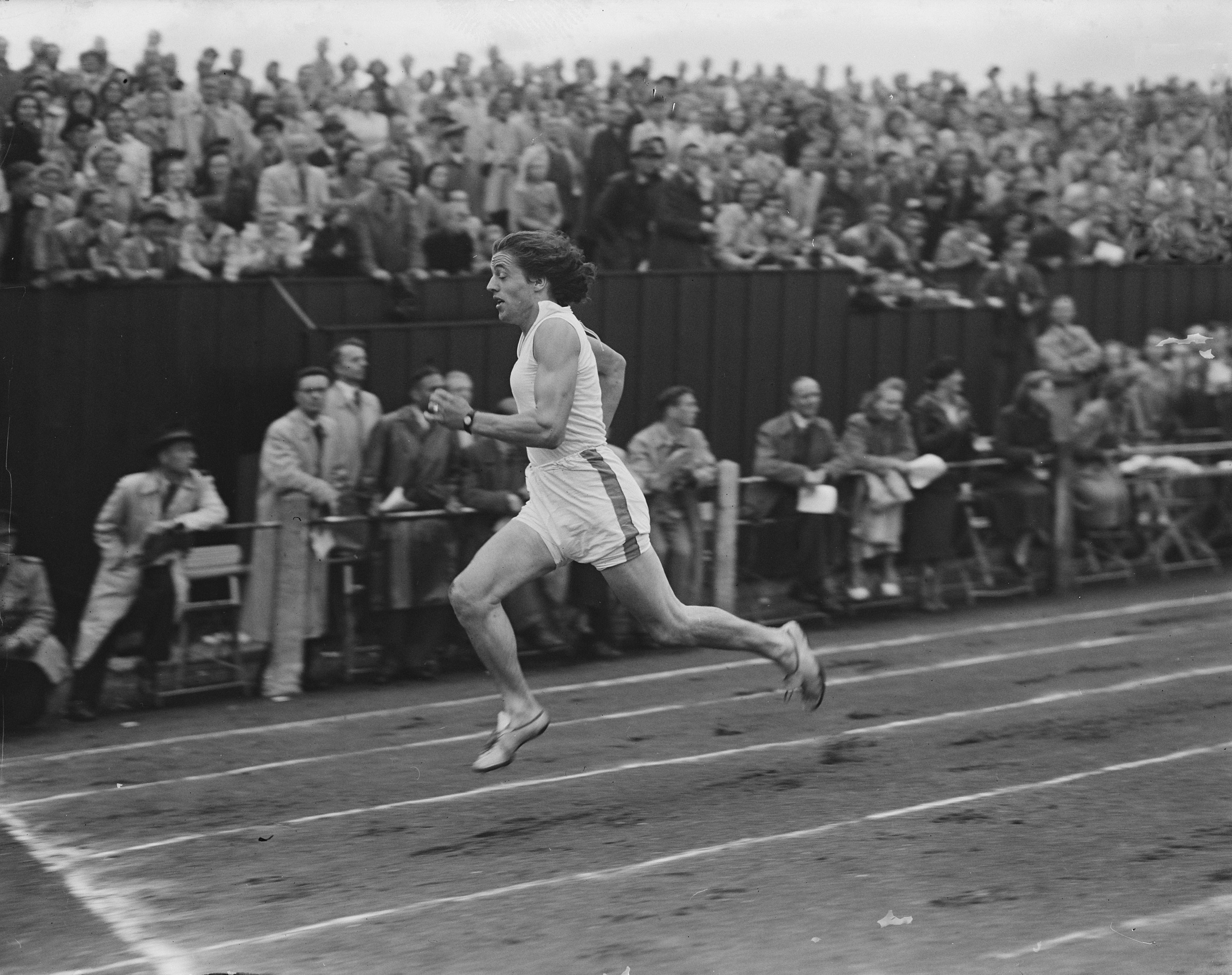
Dillema during a sprint in Groningen on 12 July 1950.

In 1950, Dillema was banned from competition for life by the IAAF. Dillema had refused to go to a mandatory sex test for the European championships in Brussels in August 1950. Dillema was the first subject of a mandatory gender verification. The IAAF introduced mandatory sex verification in 1950 and continued this practice until 1992. Dillema's national record of 24.1 seconds for the 200 metres was erased.

On 13 July 1950, Dillema was stopped on her way to an international meeting in France by the Dutch athletics authorities and expelled for life from competition.

== After the ban ==
After Dillema was banned from competition, she returned home to Friesland and did not leave her house for at least one year. She lived a quiet life in her home town afterwards and always refused to speak on the subject.

She died on 5 December 2007 in Kollum, Netherlands.

== Posthumous testing ==
Dillema, having the typical female phenotype, was designated female at birth, raised as a girl and lived her life as a woman. After her death, a forensic test on body cells obtained from her clothing showed signs of a Y-chromosome in her DNA. She may have been a genetic mosaic, having cells with either 46,XX (female) or 46,XY (male) chromosomes, in approximately a one-to-one ratio, in her skin. The forensic report speculated that Dillema developed from a zygote with an XXY genotype that promptly divided into a half XX, half XY embryo through nondisjunction. Dillema was probably a 46XX/46XY woman. This can result in an ovotesticular syndrome, one of the intersex variations known previously as "true hermaphroditism".

Her biographer Max Dohle concludes that Dillema, having a Y-chromosome, would never have been allowed to race in the last 45 years. The Barr body test (1966) as well as the test based on PCR (1992) scanned for a Y-chromosome or an SRY-gene on the Y-chromosome. All female athletes with a Y-chromosome were expelled from competition from 1966 until 2011.

Dohle concludes that Dillema was an intersex individual who had ovotesticular DSD. She had an operation on her glands in 1952. During the operation, testes or ovotestes were removed. The SRY-gene on the Y is the testis determining factor, so Dillema may have had infertile testes or ovotestes palpable in her groin. These ovotestes produce more testosterone than ovaries.

== Rehabilitation ==
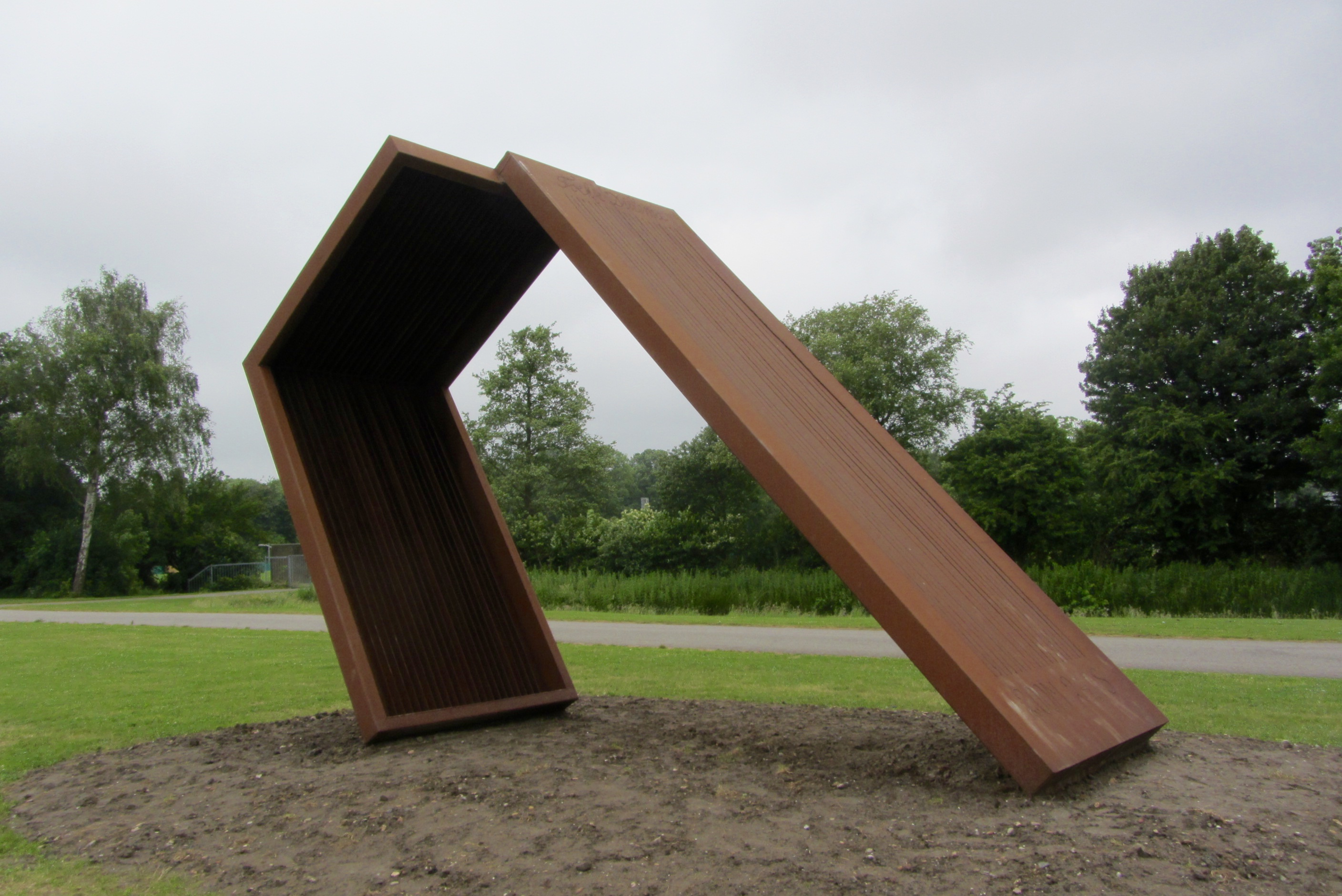
Sculpture in honor of Dillema by Ids Willemsma from 2014.

Shortly after Dillema's death, the director of the Royal Dutch Athletics Federation apologized to her family for the manner of her suspension and her personal best in the 200 metres was reinstated.

In 2011, a street in Amsterdam was named after her.

In 2014, Ids Willemsma made a sculpture commemorating Dillema, currently installed in Leeuwarden.
