= 46,XX/46,XY =

Human genetic condition

46,XX/46,XY is either a chimeric or mosaic genetic condition characterized by the presence of some cells that express a 46,XX karyotype and some cells that express a 46,XY karyotype in a single human being. Individuals with these conditions are intersex.

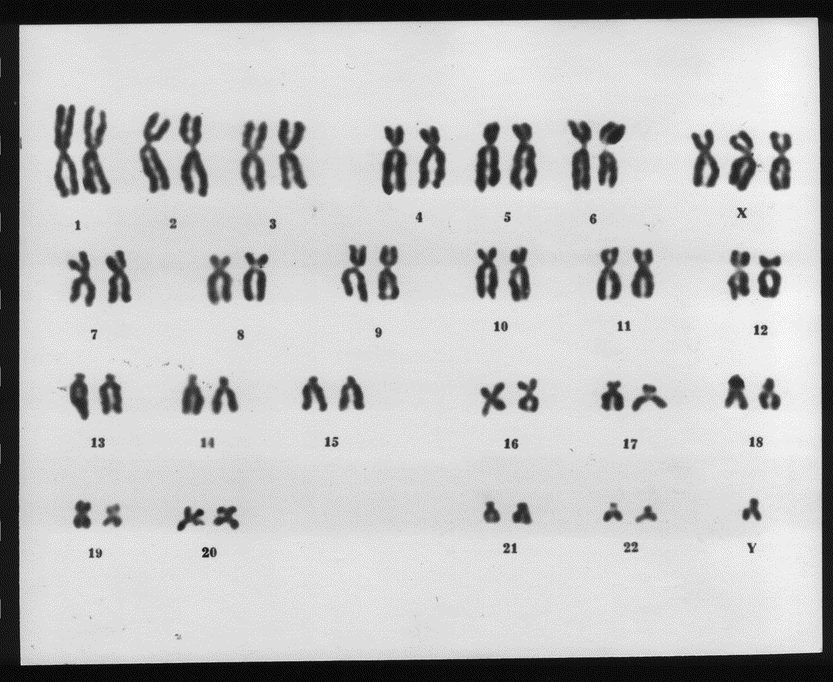
Early karyotype from bone marrow in 48,XXXY syndrome (Adapted from: Ferguson-Smith et al. Lancet 1960;ii:184–187). Aceto-orcein.

== Types ==
=== Tetragametic chimerism ===
The cause of the condition lies in conception or utero with the aggregation of two distinct zygotes or blastocysts (one of which expresses 46,XX and the other of which expresses 46,XY) into a single embryo, which subsequently leads to the development of a single individual with two distinct cell lines, instead of a pair of fraternal twins.

In humans, sexual dimorphism is a consequence of the XY sex-determination system. In typical prenatal sex differentiation, the male and female embryo is anatomically identical until week 7 of the pregnancy, when the presence or the absence of the SRY gene on the Y chromosome causes the undetermined gonadal tissue to undergo differentiation and eventually will become either a pair of testes or ovaries respectively. The cells of the developing testes produce Anti-Müllerian hormone, causing the regression of the Müllerian ducts. As individuals with 46,XX/46,XY partially express the SRY gene, the normal process by which an embryo normally develops a phenotypic male or phenotypic female may be significantly affected causing variation in the gonads, the reproductive tract, and the genitals. Despite this, there have been cases of completely normal sex differentiation occurring in 46,XX/46,XY individuals reported in the medical literature. 46,XX/46,XY chimerism can be identified during pregnancy by prenatal screening or in early childhood through genetic testing and direct observation.

=== Mosaicism ===
The cause of this condition occurs in early development, when the chromosomes of a single fertilized zygote fail to separate properly during mitosis, resulting in its cell line being divided into two lineages. These lines contain the same genetic information, but differ in which sex chromosomes they carry.

== Signs and symptoms ==
=== Physical ===
46,XX/46,XY chimeric or mosaic is associated with a wide spectrum of different physical presentations, with cases ranging from having a completely normal male or female phenotype to some cases having ovotesticular syndrome. Due to this variation, genetic testing is the only way to reliably make a diagnosis.

46,XX/46,XY is possible if there is direct observation of one or more of the following:

1. Small phallus midway in size between a clitoris and a penis
2. Incompletely closed urogenital opening (shallow vagina)
3. Abnormal urethra opening on the perineum

There have been no reported cases of both gonads being functional in the same person; the functional tissue is usually the ovarian tissue. A mix of male and female characteristics may emerge at puberty. Some individuals will experience secondary characteristics, such as breast development during puberty in a male phenotype, while others may experience deepening of the voice, secondary hair development, and gynecomastia.

Segmentation of skin (distinct patches of skin) has also been observed. However, this trait is not unique to 46,XX/46,XY chimerism nor mosaicism. It has also been observed in other types of chimerism.

=== Cognitive ===
Individuals with the condition do not experience cognitive impairment.

== Genetic mechanism ==
46,XX/46,XY is an example of tetragametic chimerism because it requires four gametes – two sperm and two ova.

- 46,XX/46,XY is most commonly explained during in conception combination of two fertilized eggs zygotes. Two ova from the mother are fertilized by two sperm from the father. One sperm contains an X chromosome; the other contains a Y chromosome. The result is that a zygote with an XY genotype and a zygote with an XX genotype are produced. Under normal circumstances, the two resulting zygotes would have gone on to become fraternal twins. However, in 46,XX/46,XY, the two zygotes merge shortly before or after fertilization to become a two-cell zygote made up of two different nuclei. The zygotes merge early enough that there is no risk of them developing into conjoined twins. Variations of this mechanism include fertilization of an ovum and its first or second polar body by two sperm.
- 46,XX/46,XY can also be explained by a mosaic-based mechanism. A single zygote is formed from the fertilization of a normal X ovum. The resulting XX/XY zygote divides to give two cell lines: 46,XX/46,XY. The 46,XX/46,XY cell lines remain and go on to become a chimeric individual.
- 46,XX/46,XY can also arise when a haploid ovum undergoes a round of mitosis, and the subsequent daughter cells are fertilized by an X and a Y sperm, respectively.

== Diagnosis ==
Diagnosing chimerism or mosaicism is particularly difficult due to the uneven distribution of 46,XX and 46,XY cells within the body. One organ might be made up of a mix of 46,XX and 46,XY, while another may contain only one genotype. As a result, different types of tissue must be analyzed to confirm the diagnosis. Blood tests might contain both or red blood cells of different blood types.

Before birth, ambiguous genitalia might be observed through ultrasound. The karyotype might also be observed through amniocentesis or cord blood sampling.

== See also ==
- Sex chromosome anomalies
- Disorders of sex development
- Mosaicism
- Chimerism
- Ovotesticular syndrome
- Intersex
- Hermaphrodite
