= Txus García =

Spanish poet and activist (born 1974)

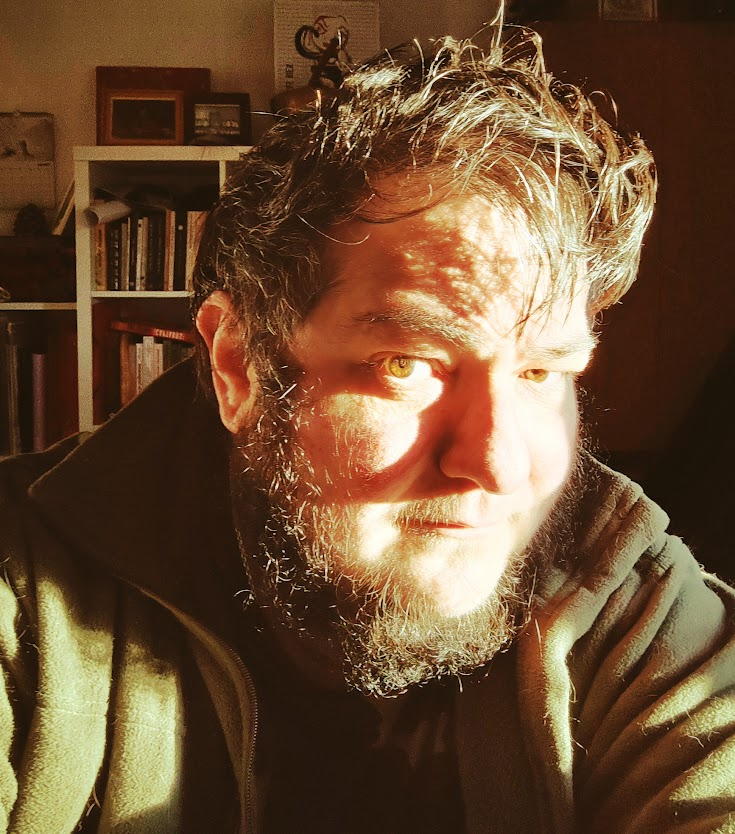
- García in 2024
- Born: Txus García Pascual; 23 November 1974 (age 51); Tarragona, Catalonia, Spain
- Occupations: Poet; interfaith deacon; performer; educator
- Website: txusgarcia.com

Txus García (born 23 November 1974) is a Spanish poet, sociocultural educator, interfaith deacon, and rhapsodist who engages in LGBTQ activism through his staged performances based on his own, and other texts. Before his gender transition, he has referred to himself as a "weird lady" who fights independently for human and animal rights.

== Biography ==
The fifth child of a mixed family of fishermen from the seraglio district and the peasant rural areas, he reclaims his working-class roots through his prose and poetry, with numerous references to his origins. Similarly, he champions bastard poetry, dissident bodies and identities, and poetic and theatrical truth. He lived in his hometown until the age of 37, where he worked as a sociocultural educator and trainer for various organizations and institutions. He eventually moved to Barcelona to work in the social sector and strengthen the reach of his activities in queer performance poetry and activism.

In 2021, after the death of his parents, he settled in Alt Penedès, defined himself as a non-binary trans man, and dedicated himself to creativity, animal rights activism and the rights of transgender people.

In October 2024, after extensive training in liberation, feminist, and queer theology, he was ordained a deacon by the Association of Roman Catholic Women Priests (ARCWP), an international association that fights for the recognition, ordination, and equality of women, LGBTQIA+ people, and other dissidents in the Catholic Church.

== Career ==
Trained in theatrical techniques, cabaret, and the performance style of Jango Edwards, his stage presence is based on audience interaction, tenderness, and a sense of humor. He has been reciting his own and others' texts in numerous venues since 1995 and has participated in various projects with other artists (theater, audiovisual projects, and media).

García has participated in numerous magazines, media outlets and anthologies (Norma Comics, Classiques Garnier, Pol·len Edicions, Ediciones de la Universidad de Sevilla, Icària, Vitruvio, Luces de Gálibo, Sial Ediciones or Huerga & Fierro), and some of his verses have been translated into French, English, Greek, Catalan, and Galician.

His first book, Poesía para niñas bien (Tits in my bowl) (Cangrejo Pistolero Ediciones, Seville, 2011), was reissued in 2018 by Edicions Bellaterra with a prologue by June Fernández and collages by Ana Elena Pena. His second collection of poems, *Este torcido amor (la ternura de los ahogados)*, also published by Edicions Bellaterra, has a prologue by Meri Torras and includes words by Princesa Inca. The illustrations are original works by Antonio García Villarán.

García regularly publishes on his website and social media and collaborates with other media outlets or activist platforms, such as Píkara Magazine. His poems are included in educational activities related to sexual diversity and gender fluidity, and some have been reviewed in communications and national and international publications specializing in literature, gender, and sexual diversity.
