= El Salto (newspaper) =

Spanish newspaper

- Type: Alternative daily newspaper
- Format: Tabloid
- Owner(s): Independent (Grassroots)
- Publisher: Co-op enterprise "Cooperativa Editorial S. Coop."
- Founded: March, 2017
- Political alignment: Left-wing
- Language: Spanish, Catalan, Galician, Basque
- Headquarters: Plaza de Luca de Tena 13, Madrid, Spain
- ISSN: 2530-5913
- Website: elsaltodiario.com

El Salto is a Spanish alternative newspaper, with formats both online and offline (in paper). Online, it is a daily newspaper, while in paper it is a quarterly magazine, with 7 different versions depending on the Spanish region. This newspaper was established after the merge of 20 alternative media including Diagonal, the feminist magazine Pikara Magazine or the economist magazine El Salmón Contracorriente.
