= Diagonal (disambiguation) =

A diagonal is a line segment joining two non-adjacent vertices of a polygon or polyhedron.

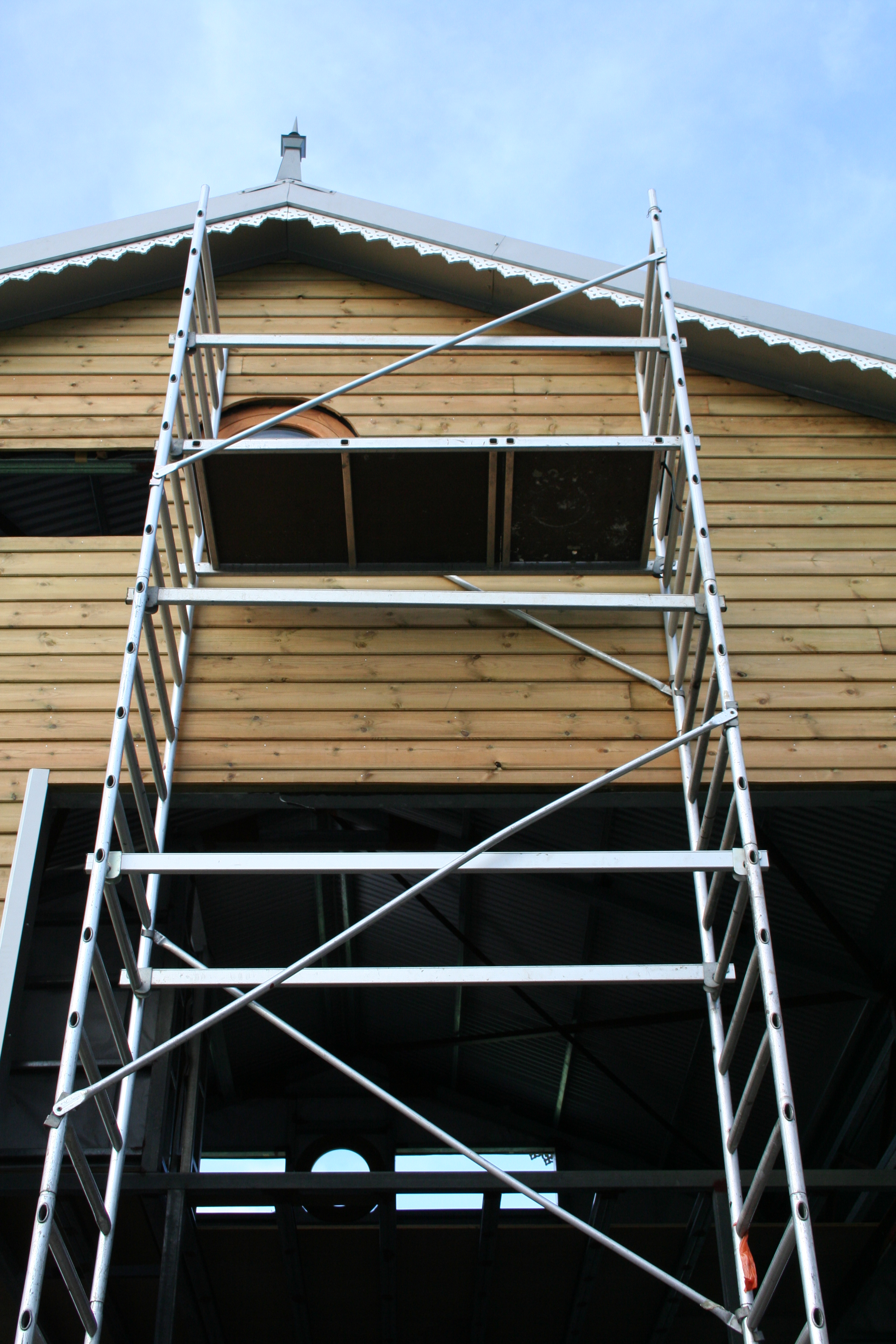
A stand of basic scaffolding on a house construction site, with diagonal braces to maintain its structure

Diagonal may also refer to:

- Diagonal brace, a beam used to brace a rectangular structure (such as scaffolding) to withstand strong forces pushing into it
- Diagonal pliers, wire-cutting pliers whose cutting edges intersect the joint rivet "on a diagonal"
- Diagonal lashing, a type of lashing used to bind spars or poles together so that the lashings cross over the poles at an angle
- Diagonal system of control, the method referees and assistant referees use to position themselves in one of the four quadrants of an association football pitch
- Main diagonal, the entries of a matrix whose row and column indices are the same
- Diagonal matrix, a matrix whose entries off the main diagonal are all zero
- The natural injection $x\mapsto(x,x)$ of a set into its Cartesian square, or the image thereof
- Avinguda Diagonal, a street in Barcelona
- Diagonal (newspaper), a Spanish newspaper

== See also ==
- Diagon (disambiguation)
