= Hypospadias =

Malformation in which the urethral opening is misplaced

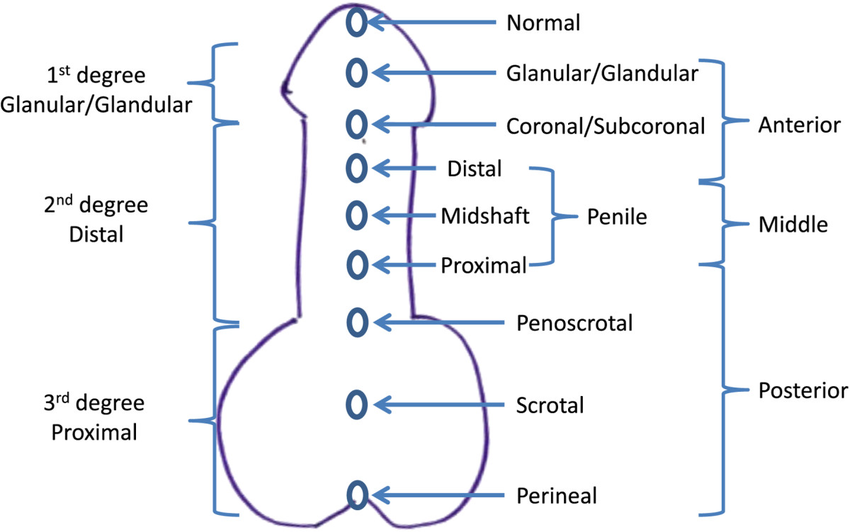
- Some possible placements of the urethra.
- Pronunciation: /haɪpoʊˈspeɪdiəs/
- Specialty: Urology, medical genetics

Hypospadias is a common malformation in fetal development of the penis in which the urethra does not open from its usual location on the head of the penis.

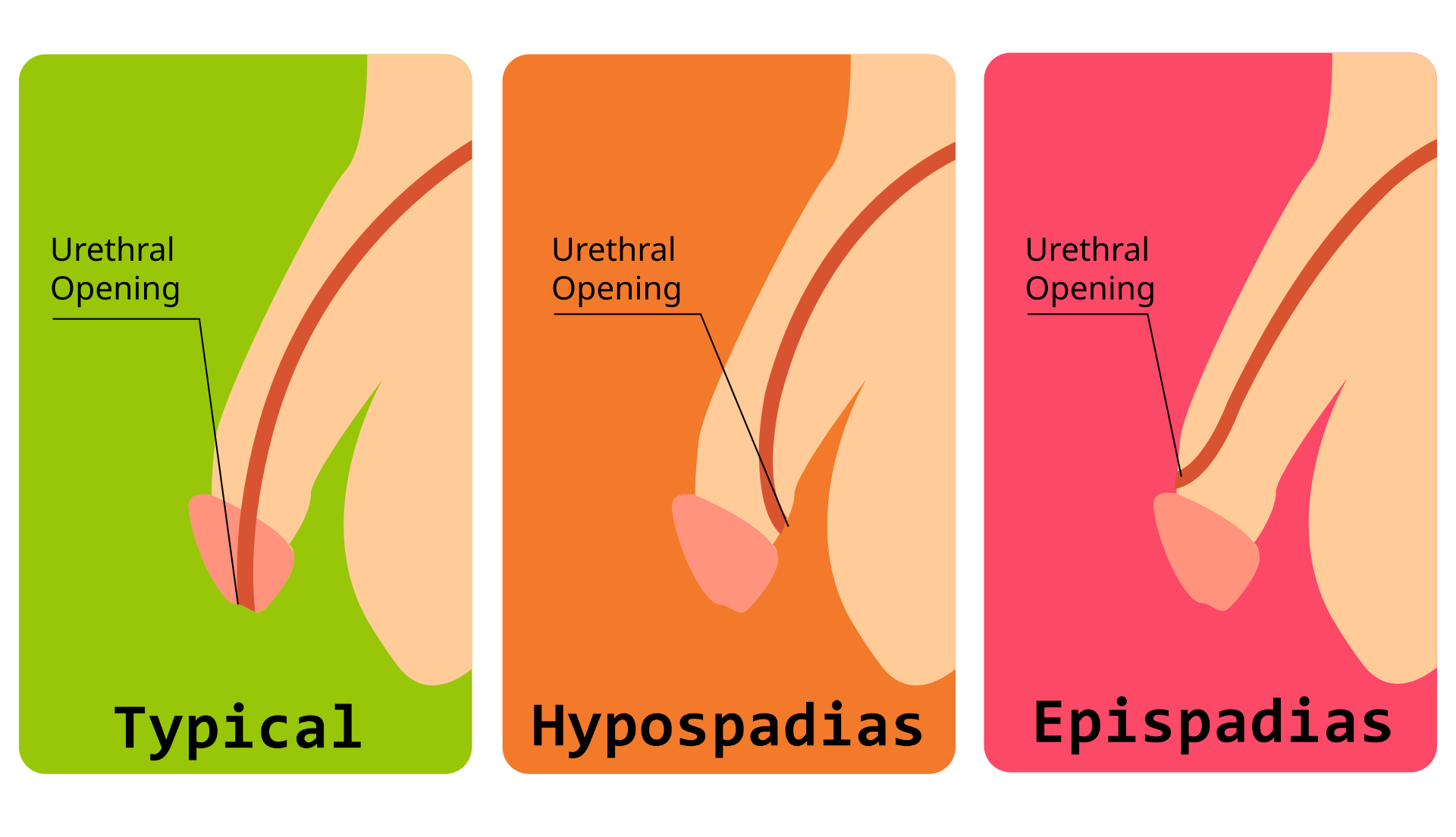
Urethral variations in a penis

It is the second-most common birth defect of the male reproductive system, affecting about one of every 250 males at birth, although when including milder cases, is found in up to 4% of newborn males.

Roughly 90% of cases are the less serious distal hypospadias, in which the urethral opening (the meatus) is on or near the head of the penis (glans). The remainder have proximal hypospadias, in which the meatus is located on the shaft of the penis, near or within the scrotum. Shiny tissue or anything that typically forms the urethra instead extends from the meatus to the tip of the glans; this tissue is called the urethral plate. In most cases, the foreskin is less developed and does not wrap completely around the penis, leaving the underside of the glans uncovered. Also, a downward bending of the penis, commonly referred to as chordee, may occur. Chordee is found in 10% of distal hypospadias and 50% of proximal hypospadias cases at the time of surgery. Also, the scrotum may be higher than usual on either side of the penis (called penoscrotal transposition).

Urethral variations in a vulva

The cause of hypospadias is unknown; scientists have investigated both genetic and environmental mechanisms, such as prenatal hormones. Another model suggests hypospadias arises as a result of unerased epigenetic markers which canalize sexual development. It most often occurs by itself, without other variations, although in about 10% of cases it may be part of a disorder of sex development condition or a medical syndrome with multiple abnormalities.

The most common associated difference is an undescended testicle, which has been reported in around 3% of infants with distal hypospadias and 10% with proximal hypospadias. The combination of hypospadias and an undescended testicle sometimes indicates a child has a disorder of sex development, so additional testing may be recommended to make sure the child does not have congenital adrenal hyperplasia with salt-wasting (missed diagnoses of salt-wasting CAH are related to an increased risk of neonatal morbidity) or a similar condition where immediate medical intervention is needed. Otherwise no blood tests or X-rays are routinely needed in newborns with hypospadias.

Hypospadias can be a symptom of a disorder of sex development, but in most cases, hypospadias is not associated with any other condition. Hypospadias is sometimes counted under the intersex umbrella by intersex rights activist groups, who consider the repositioning of a working urethra on a child too young to consent to be a human rights violation.

== Presentation ==
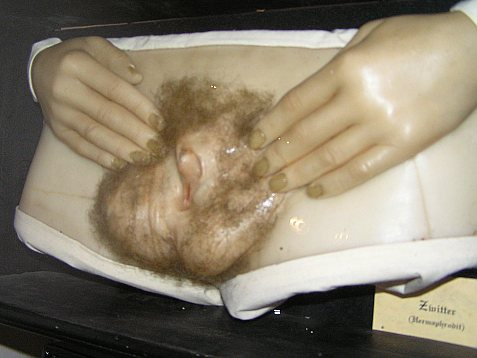
Genitalia showing major genital undermasculinization and hypospadias

A penis with hypospadias usually has a characteristic appearance. Not only is the meatus (urinary opening) lower than usual, but the foreskin is also often only partially developed, lacking the usual amount that would cover the glans on the underside, causing the glans to have a hooded appearance. However, newborns with partial foreskin development do not necessarily have hypospadias, as some have a meatus in the usual place with a hooded foreskin, called "chordee without hypospadias".

In other cases, the foreskin (prepuce) is typical and the hypospadias is concealed. This is called "megameatus with intact prepuce". The condition is discovered during newborn circumcision or later in childhood when the foreskin begins to retract. A newborn with typical-appearing foreskin and a straight penis who is discovered to have hypospadias after the start of circumcision can have circumcision completed without concern for jeopardizing hypospadias repair.

== Complications ==
There is noted to be an increase in erectile problems in people with hypospadias, particularly when associated with a chordee (down curving of the shaft). There is usually minimal interaction with ability to ejaculate in hypospadias providing the meatus remains distal. This can also be affected by the coexistence of posterior urethral valves. There is an increase in difficulties associated with ejaculation, however, including increased rate of pain on ejaculation and weak/dribbling ejaculation. The rates of these problems are the same regardless of whether or not the hypospadias is surgically corrected.

== Cause ==
=== Genes and prenatal hormones ===
Hypospadias is present at birth, although the cause of hypospadias remains unknown. The influence of genes and the intrauterine environment have been proposed. Sexual differentiation of males and female fetuses occurs under the influence of prenatal sex hormones. In humans, the development of external genitalia occurs in during an early hormone independent phase (5 to 8 weeks of gestation) and a later hormone dependent stage (weeks 8 to 12). One hypothesis proposes that atypical androgen exposure, or interference in the differentiation process, produces hypospadias.

=== Epigenetic inheritance hypothesis ===
When one identical twin is born with hypospadias, the other identical twin also has the trait only 25% of the time, despite sharing their genes and prenatal hormonal environment. Animal studies have found that androgen antagonists during early fetal development cause elevated rates of hypospadias and cryptorchidism, however, in humans these traits rarely occur together. In addition, levels of circulating testosterone overlap for both male and female fetuses throughout fetal development. Rice et al. have proposed that sexually dimorphic development occurs through epigenetic markers which are laid down during stem cell development, which blunt androgen signalling in XX fetuses, and boost sensitivity in XY fetuses. If these markers are sexually antagonistic, and if a subset of these epigenetic marks carry over generations, they are expected to produce mosaicism of sexual development in opposite-sex offspring, sometimes producing hypospadias or cryptorchidism when passed from a mother to son (feminizing the external genitalia). Two small sample studies in 2012 and 2013 found changes in the transcriptome and methylome of hypospadias patients. A 2022 study found additional evidence of atypical epigenetic methylation in foreskin tissue of hypospadias patients. Rice's model requires further testing with currently available technology to support or falsify it.

=== Associated conditions ===
The following conditions may sometimes cause hypospadias:

- Androgen insensitivity syndrome
- 5α-Reductase 2 deficiency
- 17β-Hydroxysteroid dehydrogenase III deficiency
- Isolated 17,20-lyase deficiency
- Cytochrome b_{5} deficiency
- Klinefelter syndrome
- Mixed gonadal dysgensis
- Ovotesticular syndrome
- Hypogonadism
- Aromatase excess syndrome
- Inborn errors of steroid metabolism
- Testicular dysgenesis syndrome

== Treatment ==
Where hypospadias is seen as a genital ambiguity in a child, the World Health Organization standard of care is to delay surgery until the child is old enough to participate in informed consent, unless emergency surgery is needed because the child lacks a urinary opening. Hypospadias is not a serious medical condition. A urinary opening that is not surrounded by glans tissue is more likely to "spray" the urine, which can cause a person to sit to urinate because they cannot reliably stand and hit the toilet. Chordee is a separate condition, but where it occurs, the downward curvature of the penis may be enough to make sexual penetration more difficult. For these reasons or others, people with hypospadias may choose to seek urethroplasty, a surgical extension of the urethra using a skin graft.

Surgery can extend the urinary channel to the end of the penis, straighten bending, and/or change the foreskin (by either circumcision or by altering its appearance to look more typical ("preputioplasty")), depending on the desire of the patient. Urethroplasty failure rates vary enormously, from around 5% for the simplest repairs to damage in a normal urethra by an experienced surgeon, to 15-20% when a buccal graft from the inside of the mouth can be used to extend a urethra, to close to 50% when graft urethral tubes are constructed from other skin.

When the hypospadias is extensive–third degree/penoscrotal–or has associated differences in sex development such as chordee or cryptorchidism, the best management can be a more complicated decision. The world standard (UN and WHO) forbids nonessential surgery to produce a "normal" appearance without the informed consent of the patient, and the American Academy of Pediatrics currently recommends but does not require the same standard. The AAP Textbook of Pediatric Care states "Gender assignment in patients with genital ambiguity should be made only after careful investigation by a multidisciplinary team; increasingly, surgical decisions are delayed until the child is able to participate in the decision-making process." A karyotype and endocrine evaluation should be performed to detect intersex conditions or hormone deficiencies that have major health risks (i.e. salt-wasting). If the penis is small, testosterone or human chorionic gonadotropin (hCG) injections may be given with consent to enlarge it before surgery if this will increase the chance of a successful urethral repair.

Surgical repair of severe hypospadias may require multiple procedures and mucosal grafting. Preputial skin is often used for grafting and circumcision should be avoided before repair. In patients with severe hypospadias, surgery often produces unsatisfactory results, such as scarring, curvature, or formation of urethral fistulas, diverticula, or strictures. A fistula is an unwanted opening through the skin along the course of the urethra, and can result in urinary leakage or an abnormal stream. A diverticulum is an "outpocketing" of the lining of the urethra which interferes with urinary flow and may result in posturination leakage. A stricture is a narrowing of the urethra severe enough to obstruct flow. Reduced complication rates even for third-degree repair (e.g., fistula rates below 5%) have been reported in recent years from centers with the most experience. However, typical complications in urethroplasty for severe hypospadias can lead to long surgical cycles of failure and repair, and side effects may include loss of sexual or urinary function. Research suggests failure rates are higher when urethroplasty corrects a born condition rather than disease or injury so patients and families considering surgery for hypospadias should have realistic expectations about the risks and benefits.

=== Age at surgery ===
The results of surgery are probably not influenced by the age at which repair is done. Teens and adults typically spend one night in the hospital after surgery.

=== Preoperative hormones ===
Hormones potentially increase the size of the penis, and have been used in children with proximal hypospadias who have a smaller penis. Numerous articles report testosterone injections or topical creams increase the length and circumference of the penis. However, few studies discuss the impact of this treatment on the success of corrective surgery, with conflicting results.

=== Surgery ===
Surgery is not always required for minor hypospadias like glandar hypospadias and coronal hypospadias if the meatus is of good caliber, urine flow is in good stream and forwardly directed.

Hypospadias repair is done under general anesthesia, most often supplemented by a nerve block to the penis or a caudal block to reduce the general anesthesia needed, and to minimize discomfort after surgery.

Many techniques have been used during the past 100 years to extend the urinary channel to the desired location. Today, the most common operation, known as the tubularized incised plate or "TIP" repair, rolls the urethral plate from the low meatus to the end of the glans. TIP repair, also called the Snodgrass Repair (after the creator of the method, Warren Snodgrass), is the most widely used procedure and surgical method for hypospadias repair worldwide. This procedure can be used for all distal hypospadias repairs, with complications afterwards expected in less than 10% of cases.

Less consensus exists regarding proximal hypospadias repair. TIP repair can be used when the penis is straight or has mild downward curvature, with success in 85%. Alternatively, the urinary channel can be reconstructed using the foreskin, with reported success in from 55% to 75%.

Most distal and many proximal hypospadias are corrected in a single operation. However, those with the most severe condition having a urinary opening in the scrotum and downward bending of the penis are often corrected in a two-stage operation. During the first operation the curvature is straightened. At the second, the urinary channel is completed. Any complications may require additional interventions for repair.

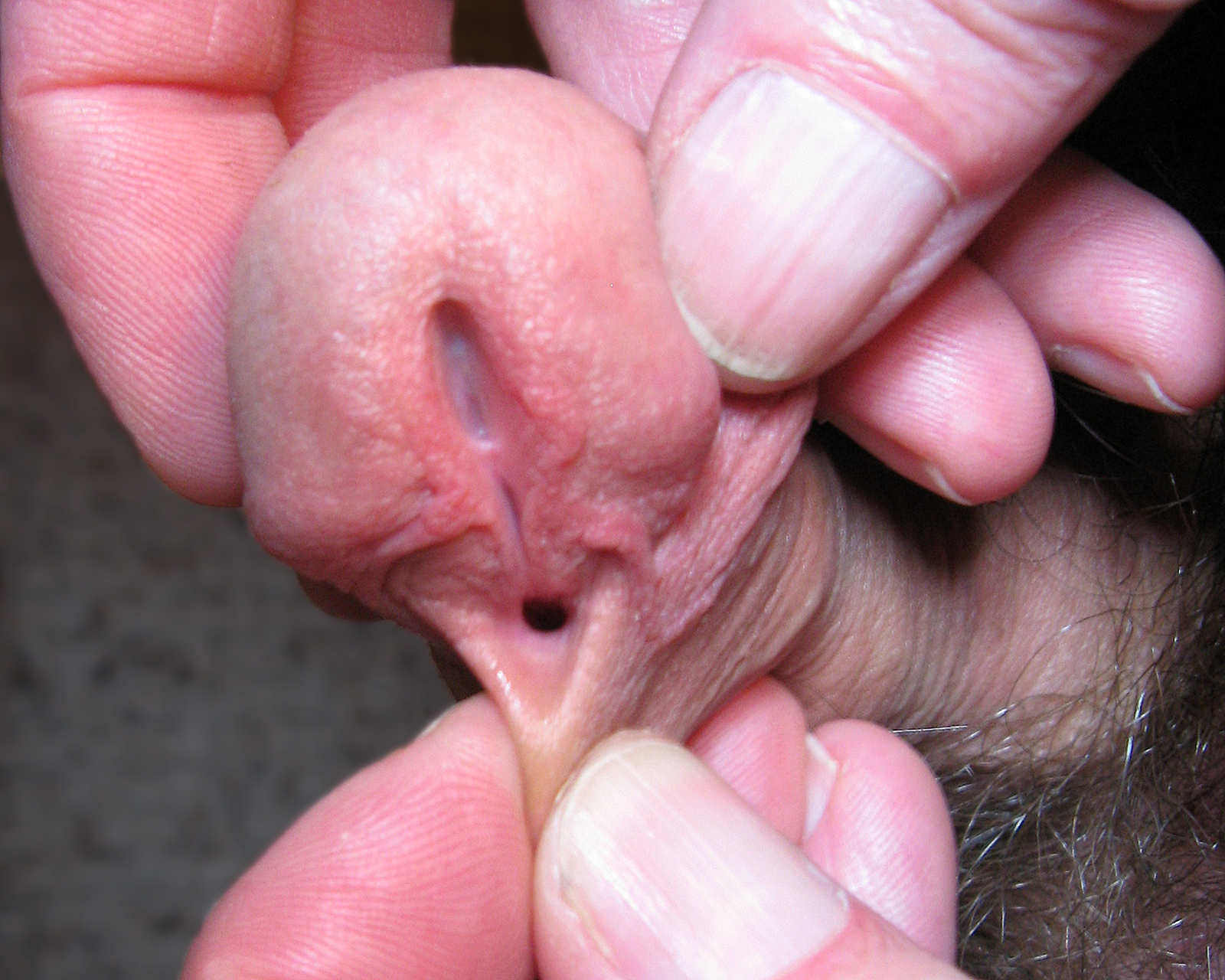
Example of penis with hypospadias

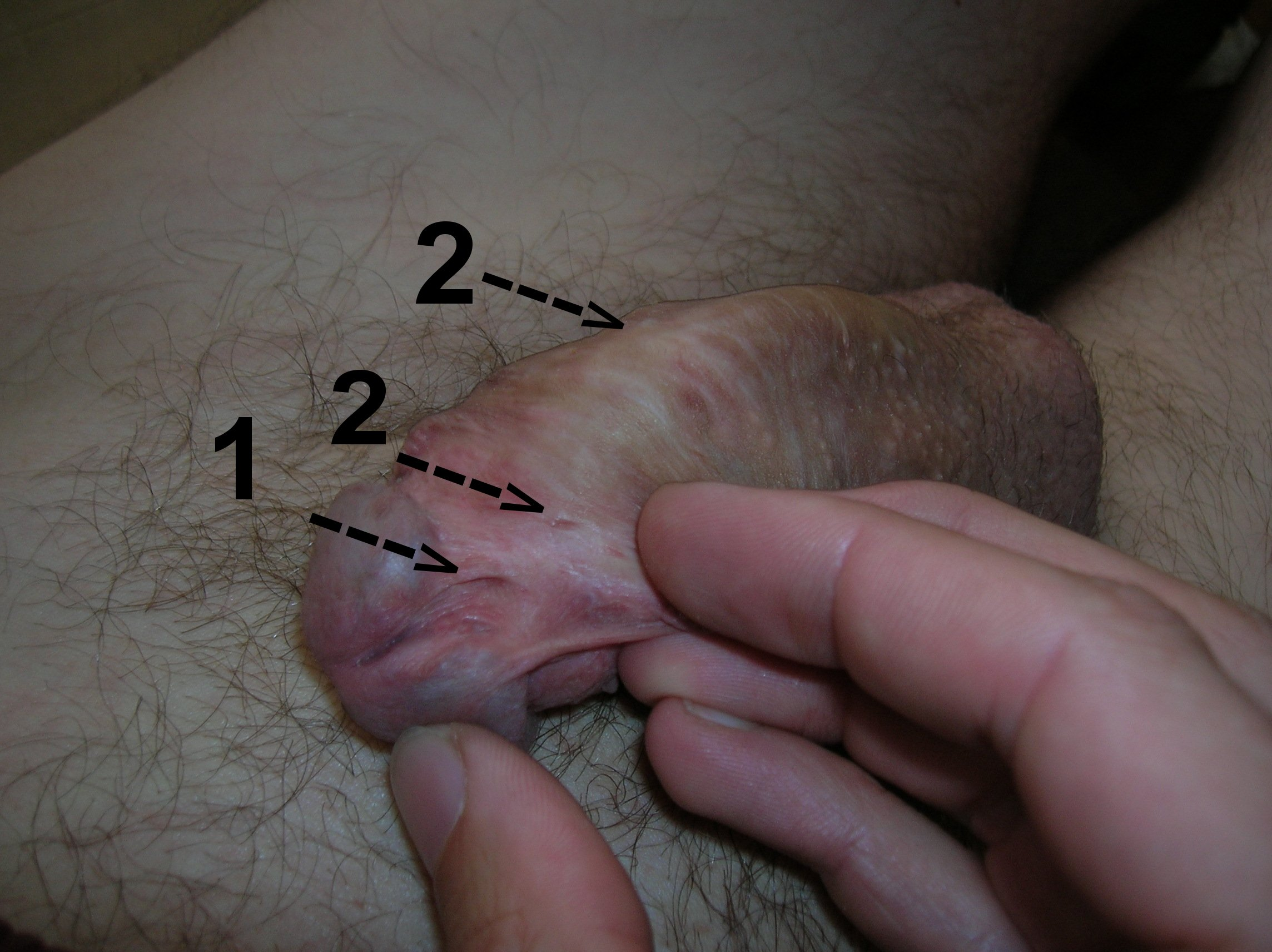
Penis with hypospadias (1) and two fistulae (2)

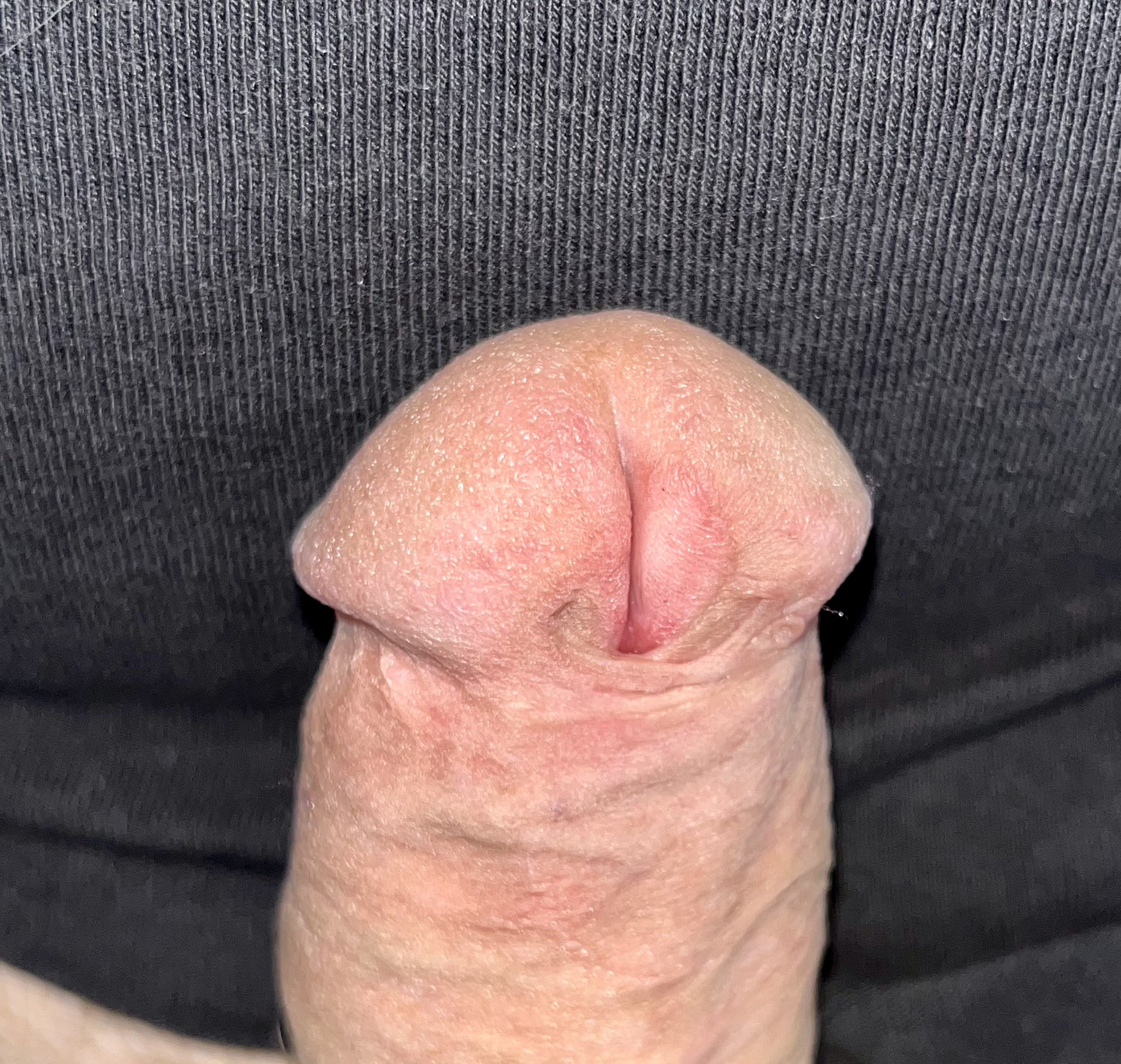
Adult penis with hypospadias

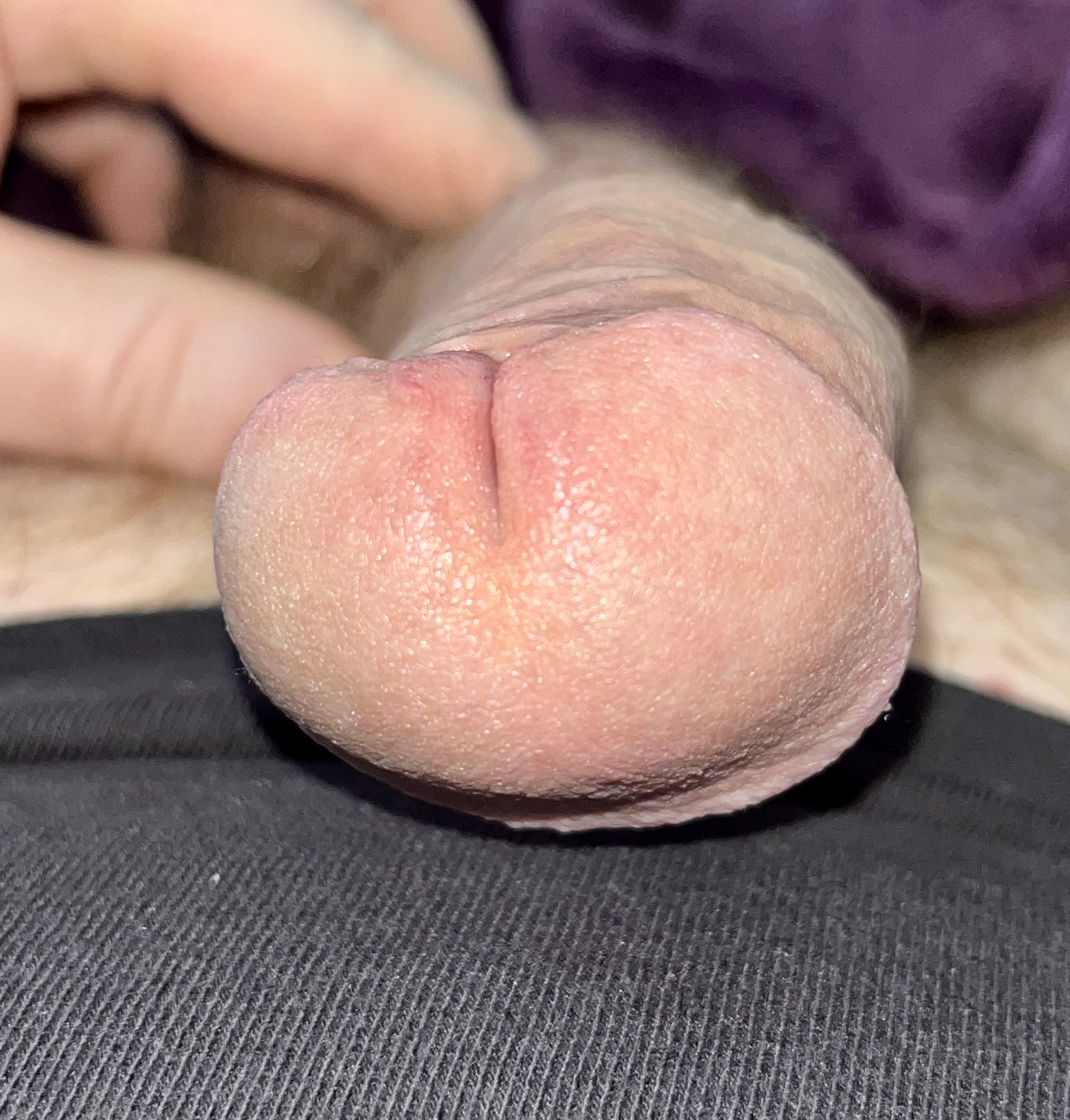
Adult penis with hypospadias

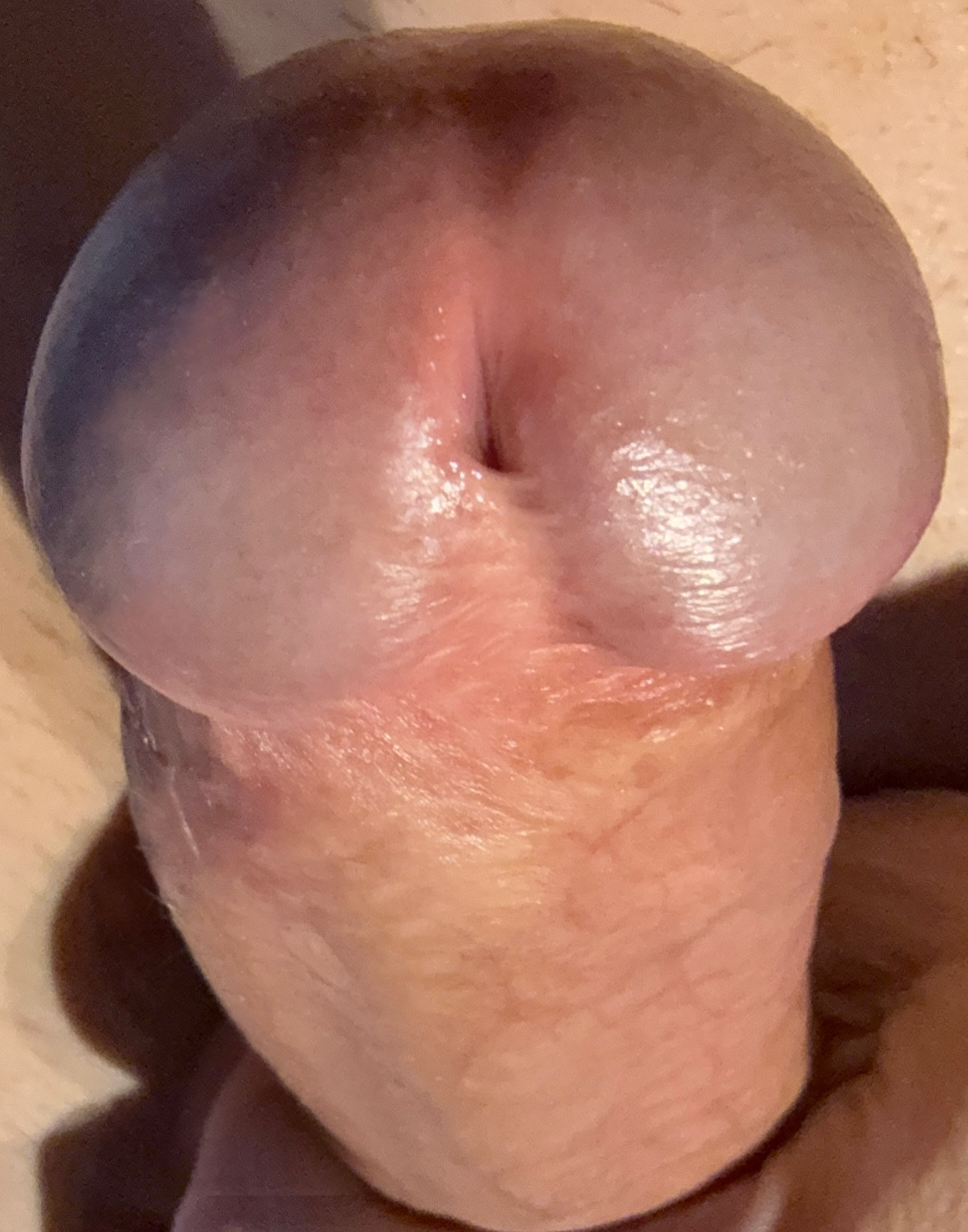
Glans penis with hypospadias repaired as an adult

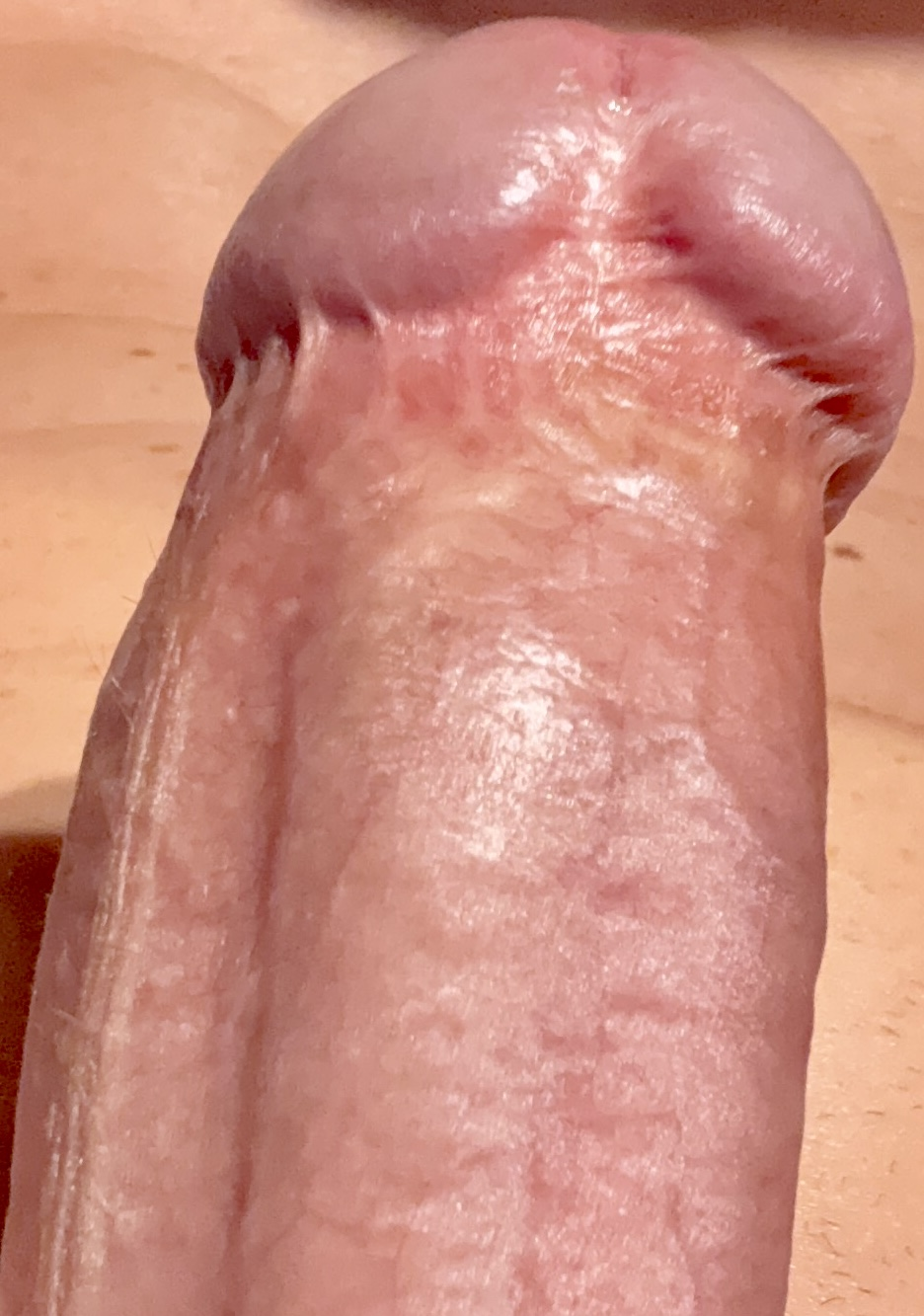
Penis with hypospadias repaired as an adult

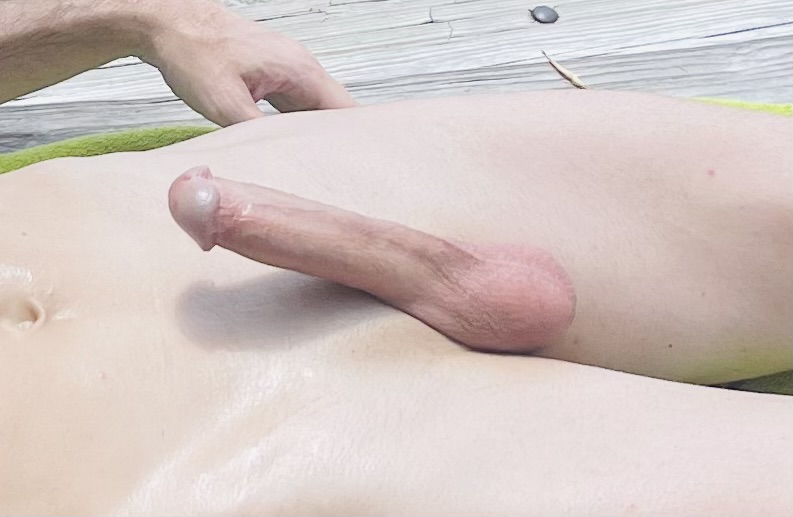
Penis with hypospadias repaired as an adult - side view

== Outcomes ==
Problems that can arise include a small hole in the urinary channel below the meatus, called a fistula. The head of the penis, which is open at birth in children with hypospadias and is closed around the urinary channel at surgery, sometimes reopens, known as glans dehiscence. The new urinary opening can scar, resulting in meatal stenosis, or internal scarring can create a stricture, either of which cause partial blockage to urinating. If the new urinary channel balloons when urinating a child is diagnosed with a diverticulum.

Most complications are discovered within six months after surgery, although they occasionally are not found for many years. In general, when no problems are apparent after repair in childhood, new complications arising after puberty are uncommon. However, some problems that were not adequately repaired in childhood may become more pronounced when the penis grows at puberty, such as residual penile curvature or urine spraying due to rupture of the repair at the head of the penis.

Complications are usually corrected with another operation, most often delayed for at least six months after the last surgery to allow the tissues to heal sufficiently before attempting another repair. Results when circumcision or foreskin reconstruction are done are the same. (Figure 4a, 4b)

Patients and surgeons had differing opinions as to outcomes of hypospadias repair, that is, patients might not be satisfied with a cosmetic result considered satisfactory by the surgeon, but patients with a cosmetic result considered not very satisfactory by the surgeon may themselves be satisfied. Overall, patients were less satisfied than surgeons.

Living with hypospadias can present challenging emotional obstacles. Many men, whether they have had surgical repair of their hypospadias as a child or not often are very guarded in school bathrooms or locker rooms. Secrecy about the condition can complicate emotional pain, because talking about the penis is often a taboo subject. Worry, anxiety and feelings of shame are common among adult men born with hypospadias.

== Epidemiology ==
Hypospadias is among the most common birth defects in the world and is said to be the second-most common birth defect in the male reproductive system, occurring once in every 250 males. At birth, it may affect as many as 1% of males, although prevalence may vary by country. When including milder cases, as many as 4% of males are affected.

Due to variations in the reporting requirements of different national databases, data from such registries cannot be used to accurately determine either incidence of hypospadias or geographical variations in its occurrences.

== Adults ==
While most hypospadias repairs are done in childhood, occasionally, an adult desires surgery because of urinary spraying or unhappiness with the appearance.

A direct comparison of surgical results in children versus adults found they had the same outcomes, and adults can undergo hypospadias repair or reoperations with good expectations for success.

== Female hypospadias ==
Variations of the urogenital sinus involving urethral anomalies in females have sometimes been referred to as female hypospadias, although more often variations in the female urethra are classified as forms of persistent urogenital sinus (PUGS) or other anomalies of the urogenital sinus.

Cases of what are sometimes labelled extreme hypospadias in males can also sometimes involve a persistent urogenital sinus when severe under-masculinization of a male results in partial masculinization with vestigial vaginal remnants or a blind ending vaginal pouch, such as in androgen insensitivity syndrome or 5α-Reductase 2 deficiency.

Inverse to how hypospadias may be caused by prenatal under-masculinization in males, the presence of a persistent urogenital sinus can sometimes be caused by prenatal masculinization in females.

Virilized females, such as females born with congenital adrenal hyperplasia or aromatase deficiency, are sometimes assigned male at birth after having been mistakenly believed to be a male with hypospadias due to a virilized clitoris and persistent urogenital sinus opening resembling a penis and urethra. Without testicles to secrete anti-müllerian hormone during sexual development, the genital opening erroneously assumed to be penile hypospadias is usually a persistent urogenital sinus attached to a full or partial vagina, full cervix, full uterus that is usually capable of menstruation and pregnancy, and ovaries that are usually capable of female fertility. In other cases androgens may masculinize the external genitalia of a female embryo and cause labialscrotal fusion during development to the point that the vaginal opening along with the lower portion of the vaginal canal are no longer present, in which case menstrual fluid may sometimes be expelled from a phallic urethra connected to a urogenital sinus or result in hematometra if the menstrual fluid cannot exit the body via some form of persistent urogenital sinus or urethra.

The involvement of a vaginal or müllerian structures create a distinction between simple hypospadias and a condition of the urogenital sinus.

== Society and culture ==
Notable individuals with hypospadias:

- Henry II of France
- Brendan Cole
- Tiger Devore
- Troy Kinne
- Gabriel J. Martín
- Scout Schultz
- Lil Dicky
- Sa Bangji

== See also ==
- Epispadias
- Chordee
- Clitorphallus
- Urogenital sinus
- Corpus spongiosum
- Corpus cavernosum
- Sexual differentiation
- Disorders of sex development
- Intersex
- Quigley scale
