= Pedro Noel =

Brazilian journalist and graduated philosopher

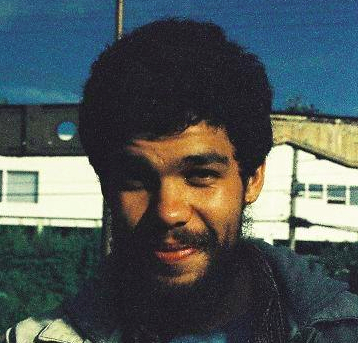
- Noel in Quito, June 2014
- Born: 1987 (age 38–39); Petropolis, Rio de Janeiro, Brazil
- Education: Philosophy; Communication Sciences
- Alma mater: Universidad de Salamanca, Vrije Universiteit Brussel
- Occupations: Journalist, Researcher
- Organization: AWP

Pedro Noel is a Brazilian journalist and graduated philosopher. According to Romanian media, he is also an Internet media activist, known as 'one of those who made 700 thousand Spaniards take the streets' in 2011.

== Whistleblowing and investigative journalism ==
In December 2010, under the handle of 'FuturePress', Noel and Carrion started to write to the news portal WLCentral.org where they exposed in different languages and using different approaches for more than one year analysis on whistleblowing material, articles and reports on human-rights violations, civic-movements and net-neutrality.

In the late 2011, Pedro Noel along with other journalists started the Associated Whistleblowing Press, a media agency focused on the defense of human rights by promoting transparency, freedom of information and speech, whistleblowing and investigative journalism, conceived as a global network made up of cooperative local platforms and actors.

As the editor of AWP, Pedro Noel took part in more than 50 revelations of wrongdoing, corruption and abuse in Spain, Mexico, Ecuador, Peru and Iceland, since 2011.

== Denouncing freedom of expression violations in Ecuador and Latin America ==
In a controversial session at 32nd Chaos Communication Congress in Hamburg in 2015, Noel held a talk with Canadian journalist Bethany Horne denouncing violations of free speech standards by the Ecuadorian government. During the talk, Pedro Noel released documents providing evidence that press and media coverage of critical issues were considered by Ecuadorian government as risk factors for democratic stability through the local platform Ecuador Transparente, operated by Associated Whistleblowing Press. The publication followed previous denounces, also performed by Ecuador Transparente, of physical and on-line surveillance and spying against activists, journalists and politicians in Ecuador, performed by the local government. In April 2016, Noel also took part in the publication of alleged proofs of illegal Internet censorship performed by Ecuadorian government. In November 2016, Pedro Noel also participated in the release of the Godwin Papers, which showed on-line harassment and discredit campaigns managed by the Ecuadorian government against local journalists, media outlets and the Inter-American Commission of Human Rights.

== Social networks ==
In 2011, along with other Internet activists and researchers, Pedro Noel started the project TheGlobalSquare in partnership with TU Delft and its project Tribler. The social network is focused on attack and censorship resilient P2P information broadcasting and social systems.

== Spanish Indignados ==
Along with Santiago Carrion, Noel founded the news portal EuropeanRevolution.net, a portal conceived as an informative platform for activists, having as first goal to translate into English what was happening with the 15 May movement and in the squares occupations around Europe in order to expand its impact worldwide.

This led Noel to collaborate with TakeTheSquare.net project, originally formed as an extension of the International Committee of the camp that started in Puerta del Sol, Madrid, Spain. The project was aimed to create a task-force seeking structured change of the worldwide political reality- designed to bring the May 15th ideals to a global context.

Noel and other were the responsible for the worldwide online campaign which culminated in the global day of action on October 15th 2011 in more than 950 cities in 82 countries and its main website 15October.net.

== See also ==
- Free Speech
- Investigative Journalism
- Philosophy
- Whistleblowing
- GlobaLeaks
- Tor (anonymity network)
