= Clitorophallus =

Term for the penis or clitoris

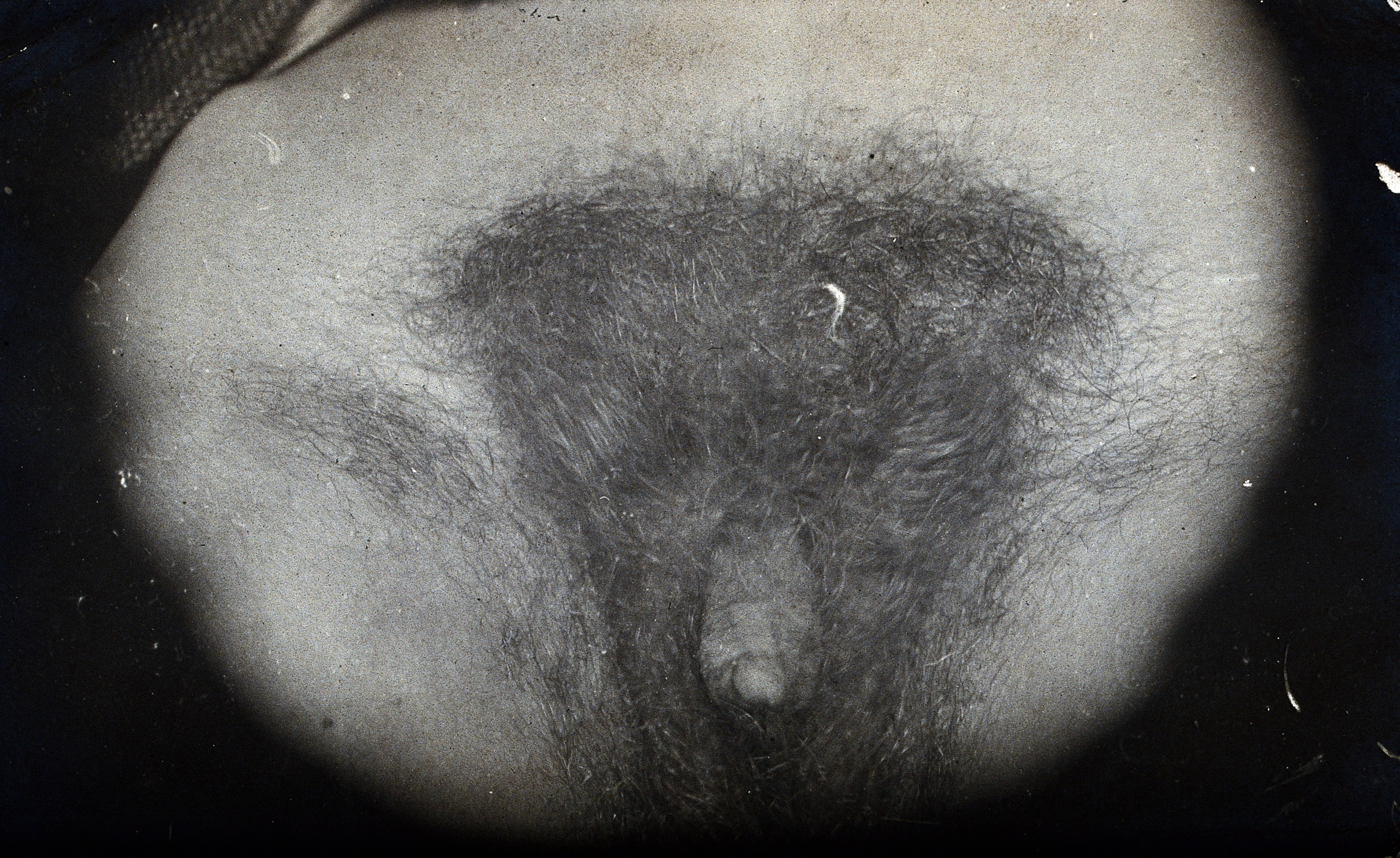
Clitorophallus of an intersex person.

Clitorophallus is a term used to refer to the penis or clitoris. It is typically used when the clitorophallus is of a size where it is not clear as to whether it is a penis or a clitoris (ambiguous genitalia). Often it is a matter of size that leads people to differentiate it as a penis or a clitoris, though placement of the urethral meatus may also play a part.

During sexual development of an embryo, the clitorophallus is typically referred to as the "genital tubercle". The stages of development between male and female embryos are identical until around the 9th week post-fertilization, thus the clitorophallus is not distinguishable as a penis or a clitoris. The position of the urethra is also likely to vary (see Hypospadias and Epispadias). These occasions may occur when someone is intersex, which is also referred to as "disorders of sex development" or "DSD". The term may also be used when referring to the phallus of a transsexual, and not limited to humans. In certain contexts, the term may appear as "clitorophallic".

The terms "clitoropenis" or "clitoropenile" have also been used for the same purposes.
