= Alison Macrina =

Librarian and Director of the Library Freedom Project

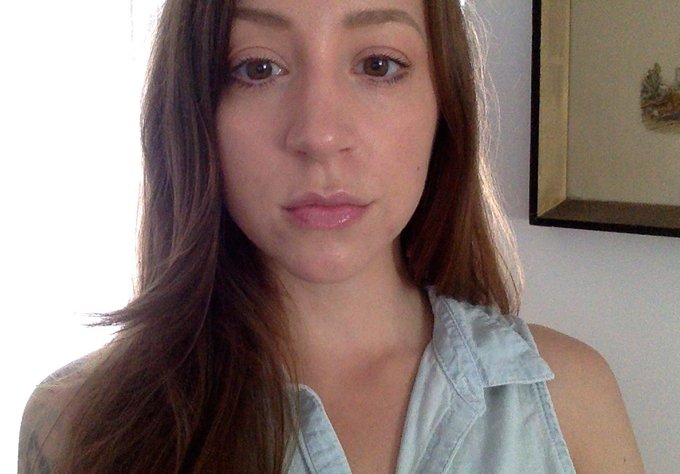
- Macrina in 2016
- Education: Temple University
- Occupations: Librarian, Activist
- Known for: Library Freedom Project

Alison Macrina is a librarian, internet activist, founder and executive director of the Library Freedom Project.

== Early life and education ==
Macrina grew up in Collingswood, New Jersey. She was an undergraduate at Temple University. She received a Master of Library and Information Science from Drexel University in 2009.

== Career ==
Macrina was a librarian at the Watertown Free Public Library in Watertown, Massachusetts and a member of Boston's Radical Reference Collective. While at the public library, Macrina made a zine for librarians titled We Are All Suspects offering a "quick and dirty introduction to basic privacy and security tools."

She founded the Library Freedom Project in 2015 in order to help non-techie people learn to protect their privacy online. As a victim of online harassment for her work on racial and gender justice, Macrina teaches other professionals, especially librarians, to use available tools to manage and deal with inappropriate behavior, saying "The thing about privilege isn't just that it shields you ... It also gives you a platform."

Macrina is vocal in her opposition to digital surveillance, and was a core contributor and Community Team Lead on the Tor Project. She is the co-author of Anonymity, the first book in the American Library Association's Library Futures Series. She was also one of the librarians protesting the CIA's recruitment attempts at the American Library Association's annual conference in 2019, co-publishing a letter with librarian Dustin Fife entitled "No Legitimization Through Association: the CIA should not be exhibiting at ALA."

In July 2020, Macrina founded the Abolitionist Library Association (AbLA), an organization for library workers and community members who support divesting from police presence in libraries.
