= Keith Ammon =

American politician

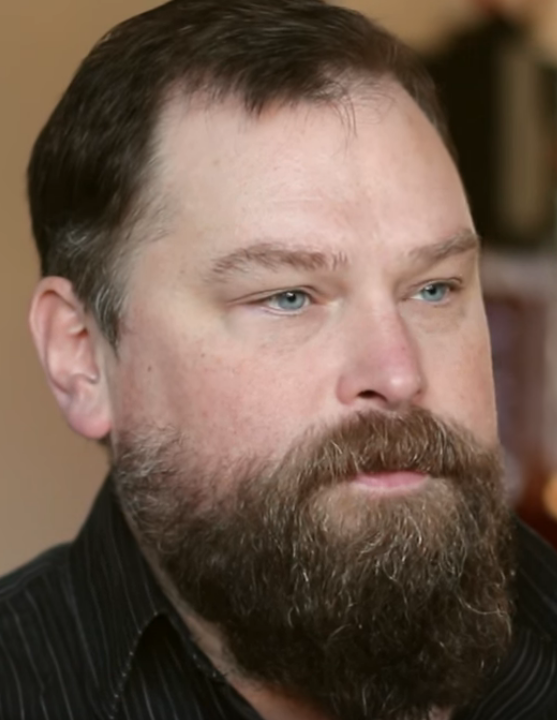
- Ammon in 2016

Member of the New Hampshire House of Representatives from the Hillsborough 40th district
- Incumbent
- Assumed office December 2, 2020
- Preceded by: Kat McGhee
- In office December 3, 2014 – December 5, 2018
- Preceded by: Gary Daniels
- Succeeded by: Kat McGhee

Personal details
- Born: Philadelphia suburbs, U.S.
- Party: Republican
- Spouse: Susan
- Profession: Politician

Keith Ammon is an American politician. He is a member of the New Hampshire House of Representatives, representing the Hillsborough 40th District. He first held the seat from 2014 to 2018 and re-elected in 2020.

== Political career ==
Ammon served on the New Boston School Board from 2012 to 2015.

In 2014, he won the District 40 seat in the State House over Democrat Henry Mullaney. Ammon was re-elected in 2016, defeating Democrat Kat McGhee. In 2018, he lost the seat to McGhee. In 2020, Ammon beat Democrat Ben Ming to again serve District 40.

In the New Hampshire House of Representatives, Ammon serves on the Commerce and Consumer Affairs Committee. He is currently the House Majority Floor Leader. 2021–2022 he was Assistant Majority Whip.

Ammon is a member of the NH House Freedom Caucus. Ammon is the organizer of the N.H. Emerging Technology Caucus, "a bipartisan, bicameral caucus guided by a philosophy of Techno-Optimism, [championing] progress and innovation while advocating for thoughtful governance that maximizes societal and economic benefits." He also serves as a director of the New Boston Republican Committee and the New Boston Taxpayers' Association.

== Political activity ==
=== Technology bills ===
==== Blockchain ====
In January 2016, he cosponsored a bill that would have allowed the state government to accept payment of taxes and fees in bitcoin. It was defeated in committee.

In 2023, Ammon sponsored bill HB645 establishing regulations and the legal framework and operational guidelines for decentralized autonomous organizations (DAOs).

==== Privacy ====
In March 2016, he introduced a bill allowing public libraries to run privacy software. The bill was written with input from the Library Freedom Project.

==== Flying cars ====
In 2020, while out of office, Ammon provided Representative Steven D. Smith with the technical requirements for a bill to create a legal framework for "flying cars" to drive on New Hampshire's roadways. When Governor Chris Sununu signed HB1182 into law on July 24, 2020, New Hampshire became the first state in the nation to enact a "Jetsons Law".

==== Nuclear power ====
In 2022, Ammon sponsored bill HB543, signed into law, establishing a commission to study nuclear power and nuclear reactor technology in New Hampshire. The NH Nuclear Study Commission, which Ammon chaired, published interim reports and a final report in 2023. Among the report's conclusions were that "The demand for computation, particularly for large and growing computing projects like AI modeling and Bitcoin mining, is rising," and "Advanced nuclear technology is essential if the goal of zero net carbon emissions is to be pursued."

In 2024, Ammon sponsored bill HB1465, to promote investigation of nuclear power. As signed into law, the final bill required coordination with studies on wind energy, renaming the Office of Offshore Wind Industry Development to the Office of Offshore Wind Industry Development and Energy Innovation.

=== Other bills ===
==== Education ====
In 2021, the Washington Post reported that Ammon was spearheading an effort to ban critical race theory in New Hampshire. Ammon's bill, as explained by The Atlantic, forbids schools from teaching “race or sex scapegoating,” questioning the value of meritocracy and suggesting that New Hampshire or the United States is “fundamentally racist.” House Bill 544 was signed into law by Sununu in July 2021.

== Other information ==
Ammon runs Ammon Technology Services, a software company specializing in pharmaceutical sales.

Ammon moved to New Hampshire from Pennsylvania in 2009 as part of the Free State Project.

In 2016, Ammon was named to GOPAC's Class of Emerging Leaders.

Ammon contributed to the Bretton Woods Summit of Consumer's Research in 2017 and 2018 as a local subject matter expert on regulation in cryptocurrency. In 2018, Ammon participated in a panel "Blockchain, Bitcoin, and Public Policy" at the Harvard Club of Boston, in connection with his sponsorship of bill HB436, exempting persons using cryptocurrencies like Bitcoin from registering as money transmitters. Ammon is the founder and chairman of the New Hampshire Blockchain Council.

In 2019 to 2020, while out of office, Ammon represented the Dutch-owned flying-car maker PAL-V in New Hampshire.
