= Warren Snodgrass =

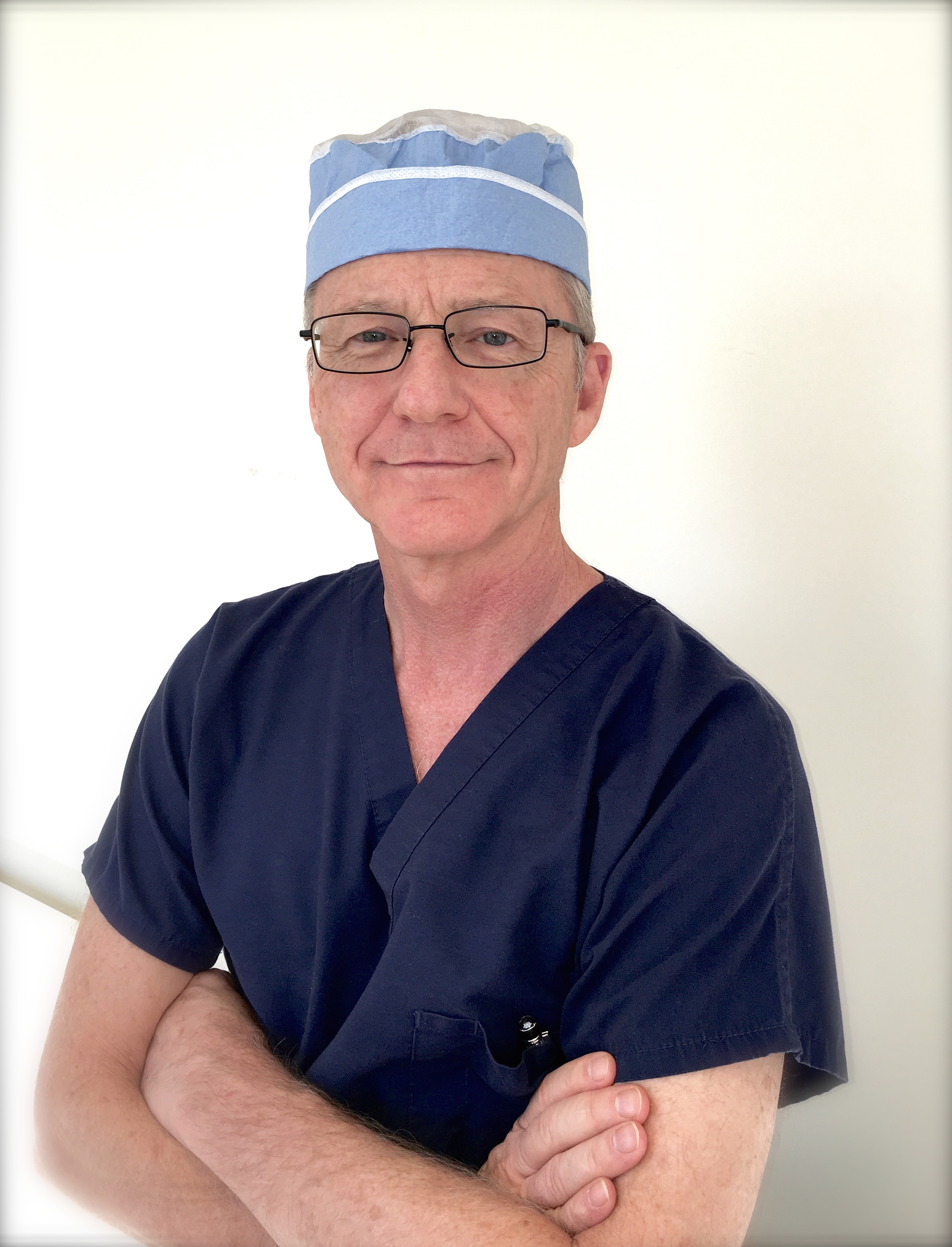
Warren Snodgrass, MD

Warren Snodgrass is a pediatric urologist specializing in the repair of hypospadias, the second most common birth defect. In 1994 he described the tubularized incised plate (TIP) repair of hypospadias, which has become known as the Snodgrass repair and has become the most common approach to repairing most forms of hypospadias. Together with Dr. Nicol Bush, he also developed the STAG repair for severe hypospadias, which later evolved into STAC. Snodgrass is internationally known for his advocacy of evidence-based surgery, and wrote the textbook Hypospadiology to establish the standard for hypospadias repair. He is in private practice near Dallas, Texas, where he is the co-director of the Hypospadias Specialty Center.

== Biography ==
Snodgrass received his medical degree from the University of Texas Medical Branch in 1980, and then completed urology residency training at Baylor College of Medicine in 1986. He spent 12 years in private practice with his father, a urologist, in Lubbock, Texas. Then he obtained fellowship training in pediatric urology at Seattle Children's Hospital before moving to Dallas. Snodgrass worked at Children's Medical Center until 2014, serving as the Chief of Pediatric Urology for 12 years. He was involved in a controversy at UT Southwestern Medical Center in 2013 after he invited two world-renowned surgeons to participate in a teaching conference, unaware that one of them had his medical license revoked.

In 2014, Snodgrass and Nicol Bush left UT Southwestern to establish PARC Urology for complex hypospadias in children and adults, the only practice in North America devoted to hypospadias and related penis birth defects. In 2020 they purchased a surgery center which became the Hypospadias Specialty Center.

In 1994, Snodgrass published a description of the TIP repair of hypospadias. The technique has become popularly known as the Snodgrass urethroplasty or Snodgrass technique and became widely employed across the world. In 2011, the Snodgrass technique was described as the dominant procedure for repairing hypospadias. In 2017, Snodgrass and Bush published the STAG repair, an improvement on older 2-stage graft operations for proximal hypospadias when TIP cannot be done. Several years later, improvements on STAG led to the STAC repair. In 2015, an analysis of all published articles regarding hypospadias since 1945 reported Snodgrass to be the most cited author.

Snodgrass has lectured and demonstrated surgical techniques internationally to pediatric urologists and surgeons. He established an annual live surgery course broadcast on the World Wide Web to teach surgeons performing hypospadias repair. Snodgrass served as editor of a pediatric urology textbook, Pediatric Urology: Evidence for Optimal Patient Management. In 2015, Snodgrass and his colleague Nicol Bush self-published a surgical textbook entitled Hypospadiology through a charity, Operation Happenis. In 2023 Snodgrass published a memoir describing his career spent trying to improve hypospadias surgery, entitled No Margin for Error: A Surgeon's Struggle Repairing Hypospadias.

== Honors and awards ==
Snodgrass was awarded honorary fellowship in the Royal College of Surgeons of Edinburgh. He has been designated a U.S. News & World Report Top Doctor. A review of the top 150 influential scientific publications on hypospadias from 1945 to 2013 reported Snodgrass was the most frequently cited author
