= Library Freedom Project =

- Formation: 2015; 11 years ago
- Type: Nonprofit
- Legal status: professional organization
- Purpose: privacy advocacy, community building, librarianship
- Director: Alison Macrina
- Deputy Director: Tess Wilson
- Website: libraryfreedom.org

Library Freedom Project is an American nonprofit organization whose stated mission "is radically rethinking the library professional organization by creating a network of values-driven librarian-activists working together to build information democracy."

Library Freedom Project (LFP) trains librarians in different community contexts (e.g. public, academic, rural libraries, and urban libraries) to inform their communities about issues related to privacy and security online. Library Freedom Institute (LFI) is LFP's training arm, offering educational opportunities for librarians, ongoing community-building, workshops, webinars, and committee work around specialized topics and sectors of librarianship.

== Funding ==
In January 2015 Library Freedom Project received a $244,700 grant from Knight Foundation. Then, in January 2016 was awarded $50,000 from the Rose Foundation's Consumer Privacy Rights Fund.

In August 2017 the Library Freedom Project was awarded a $249,504 grant from the Institute of Museum and Library Services' (IMLS) Laura Bush 21st Century Librarian Program to facilitate the use of practical privacy tools in libraries. Forty geographically-dispersed librarians participated in a six-month training course to become Privacy Advocates. New York University (NYU) and Library Freedom Project developed a formal collaborative program funded by the Institute of Museum and Library Services (IMLS) in June 2018 called "Library Freedom Institute."

By 2022, the Library Freedom Project built on its funding base by securing $1 million from the Mellon Foundation under its Public Knowledge Program.

== Library Freedom Institute ==
Library Freedom Institute (LFI) is "a free, privacy-focused... program for librarians to teach them the skills necessary to thrive as Privacy Advocates." Privacy Advocates conduct workshops to educate community members in basic online security skills to advocate for their communities through public policy.

LFI's format updates for each cohort's training, which lasts from four to six months. Topics include technology, online privacy, community building, media, activism, and education. At the end of the course, participants create capstone projects for use by the wider LFP community of librarians for teaching and research dissemination. As of July 2020, there have been four cohorts of Library Freedom Institute with over 100 graduates from the program.

Since its inception, the Library Freedom Institute has been supported by grants from the Institute of Museum and Library Services.

== Workshops ==
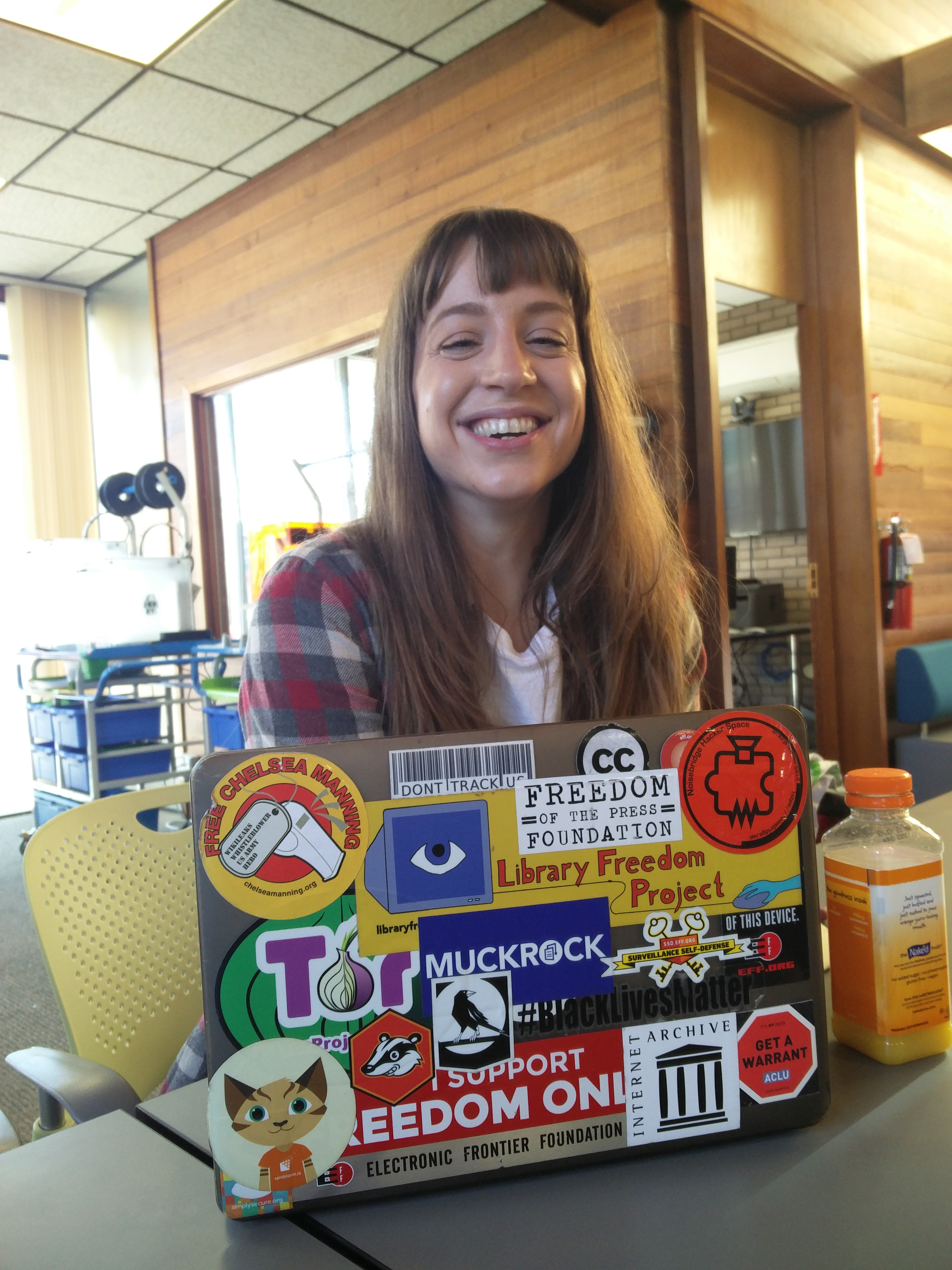
The director of the Library Freedom Project, Alison Macrina, at unBound, the technology lab and maker space of the Meridian Library District in Idaho, shortly after giving a privacy workshop in January 2016. The logos are those of assorted privacy enhancing technologies, institutions and advocacy groups such as the Tor project, the Electronic Freedom Foundation, Privacy Badger and Noisebridge

Working with American Civil Liberties Union (ACLU) affiliates across the United States, Library Freedom Project provides workshops to educate librarians about "some of the major surveillance programs and authorizations, including the USA PATRIOT Act, section 702 of the FISA Amendments Act, PRISM, XKEYSCORE, and more, connecting the NSA’s dragnet with FBI and local police surveillance". They also discuss current and developing privacy law on both the federal and state levels, in addition to advising librarians how to handle issues like gag orders and National Security Letters. Other topics covered include Privacy Enhancing Technology (PET) that might help library patrons browse anonymously or evade online tracking.

Furthermore, LFP conducts classes for library patrons that focus on on-line security and privacy. Privacy Advocate librarians adapt materials and topics to accommodate every user, from beginner to advanced, to determine their privacy needs. Library patrons, including but not limited to domestic violence survivors, political activists, whistle blowers, journalists, and LGBTQ teens or adults, require different approaches to privacy. LFP Director Alison Macrina observes that, "Digital security isn’t about which tools you use; rather, it’s about understanding the threats you face and how you can counter those threats. To become more secure, you must determine what you need to protect, and whom you need to protect it from. Threats can change depending on where you’re located, what you’re doing, and whom you’re working with."

== Tor Exit Relay Project ==
Library Freedom Project is a member of the torservers.net network, an organization of nonprofits which specializes in the general establishment of exit nodes via workshops and donations. Tor's pilot project enabled the Kilton Public Library in Lebanon, New Hampshire to become in July 2015 the first library in the United States to host Tor, running a middle relay on its excess bandwidth. This service was put on hold in early September, however, when the library was visited by the local police department after they had received a "heads up" e-mail from Department of Homeland Security highlighting the criminal uses of the Tor network (and which falsely claimed that this was the network's primary usage), whereupon the library began reconsidering the deployment from a public relations perspective.

After an outpouring of support from the Electronic Frontier Foundation, the Massachusetts and New Hampshire affiliates of the ACLU, the Tor Project itself, an editorial in the local paper Valley News strongly in favor of the pilot project, and virtually unanimous public testimony, the library board of trustees decided on 15 September 2015 to renew the anonymity service, letting stand its previous unanimous vote to establish the middle relay. A dozen libraries and their supporters nationwide expressed interest hosting their own nodes after the DHS involvement became public (an example of the Streisand effect), and U.S. Rep. Zoe Lofgren (D-Calif) released a letter on 10 December 2015, in which she asked the DHS to clarify its procedures, stating that “While the Kilton Public Library’s board ultimately voted to restore their Tor relay, I am no less disturbed by the possibility that DHS employers are pressuring or persuading public and private entities to discontinue or degrade services that protect the privacy and anonymity of U.S. citizens.”

In March 2016, New Hampshire state representative Keith Ammon introduced a bill allowing public libraries to run privacy software such as Tor which specifically referenced Tor itself. The bill was crafted with extensive input from Library Freedom director Alison Macrina, and was the direct result of the Kilton Public Library imbroglio. The bill was passed by the House 268-62.

Also in March 2016, the first Tor middle relay at a library in Canada was established, at the University of Western Ontario. Given that the running of a Tor exit node is an unsettled area of Canadian law, and that institutions are more capable than individuals to cope with legal pressures, Alison Macrina has opined that in some ways she would like to see intelligence agencies and law enforcement attempt to intervene in the event that an exit node were established.

Also in March 2016, the Library Freedom Project was awarded the Free Software Foundation's 2015 Free Software Award for Projects of Social Benefit at MIT.

As of 26 June 2016, the Kilton Library is the only library in the U.S. running a Tor exit node. However, in August of that same year, Kilton Library's IT Manager, Chuck McAndrew, said they still hoped other libraries would run their own, adding, "We always planned on our library simply being the pilot for a larger nationwide program. Like everything, this will take time. We continue to talk to other libraries, and the Library Freedom Project is actively working with a number of libraries that have an interest in participating."
