= Diagon =

Diagon may refer to:

- Diagon (river), a river in Elis, Peloponnese, Greece
- Diagon Alley, a place in Harry Potter
- Root-2 rectangle, a dynamic rectangle produced by projecting the diagonal of a square

== See also ==
- Diagonal (disambiguation)
