= Torservers.net =

Network of organizations that operate Tor nodes

torservers.net is an independent network of non-profit organisations that provide nodes to the Tor anonymity network. The network was started in June 2010 by German privacy activist and advocate Moritz Bartl and currently transfers up to 7.4 GB/s (~59.2 Gb/s) of exit node traffic as of May 2022.

Torservers.net is known for operating servers with high network bandwidth and running them as exit nodes in the Tor network, which helps increase its speed and capacity. The group additionally helps provide lawyers for relay operators along with arranging operator meetups.

== Funding ==
While Tor is free software that anyone can run, successful operation of Tor nodes may require technical expertise, access to high-bandwidth, and can involve legal complications in some jurisdictions. The Torservers.net network accepts financial donations as a way to sponsor additional nodes.

== Bavarian Raid ==
On June 20, 2018, Bavarian police raided the home of the board members of the German non-profit Zwiebelfreunde, "Friends of the Onion," (part of torservers.net). Zwiebelfreunde helps collect donations from Europe for various non-commercial providers such as Riseup.net.

The police claim the raid was prompted by a blog post from an unrelated activist that promised violence against an upcoming Alternative for Germany convention in Augsburg. The blog post was published on a website that used a Riseup.net e-mail address. Riseup Collective is based in Seattle in the United States, and reported publicly that Zwiebelfreunde does not run its service.

On August 23 the German court at Landgericht München ruled that the raid and seizures was illegal. The hardware and documentation seized had been kept under seal, and purportedly were neither analyzed nor evaluated by the Bavarian police.

== Members ==
- Artikel 5 e.V. (Germany)
- Artikel 10 e.V. (Germany)
- Associated Whistleblowing Press (Belgium, organisation stopped in 2022)
- Access Now (USA)
- Calyx Institute (USA)
- Chaos Computer Club Stuttgart (Germany)
- Coldhak (Canada)
- Derechos Digitales (Chile)
- DFRI (Sweden)
- Digitale Gesellschaft Schweiz (Switzerland)
- Electronic Frontier Finland (Finland)
- Foundation for Applied Privacy (Austria)
- Hart Voor Internetvrijheid (Netherlands)
- IceTor (Iceland)
- Koumbit (Canada)
- Library Freedom Project (USA)
- Noisebridge (USA)
- Nos Oignons (France)
- Osservatorio Nessuno (Italy)
- Zwiebelfreunde e.V. (Germany)
