= Gary L. Daniels =

American politician

Gary Daniels
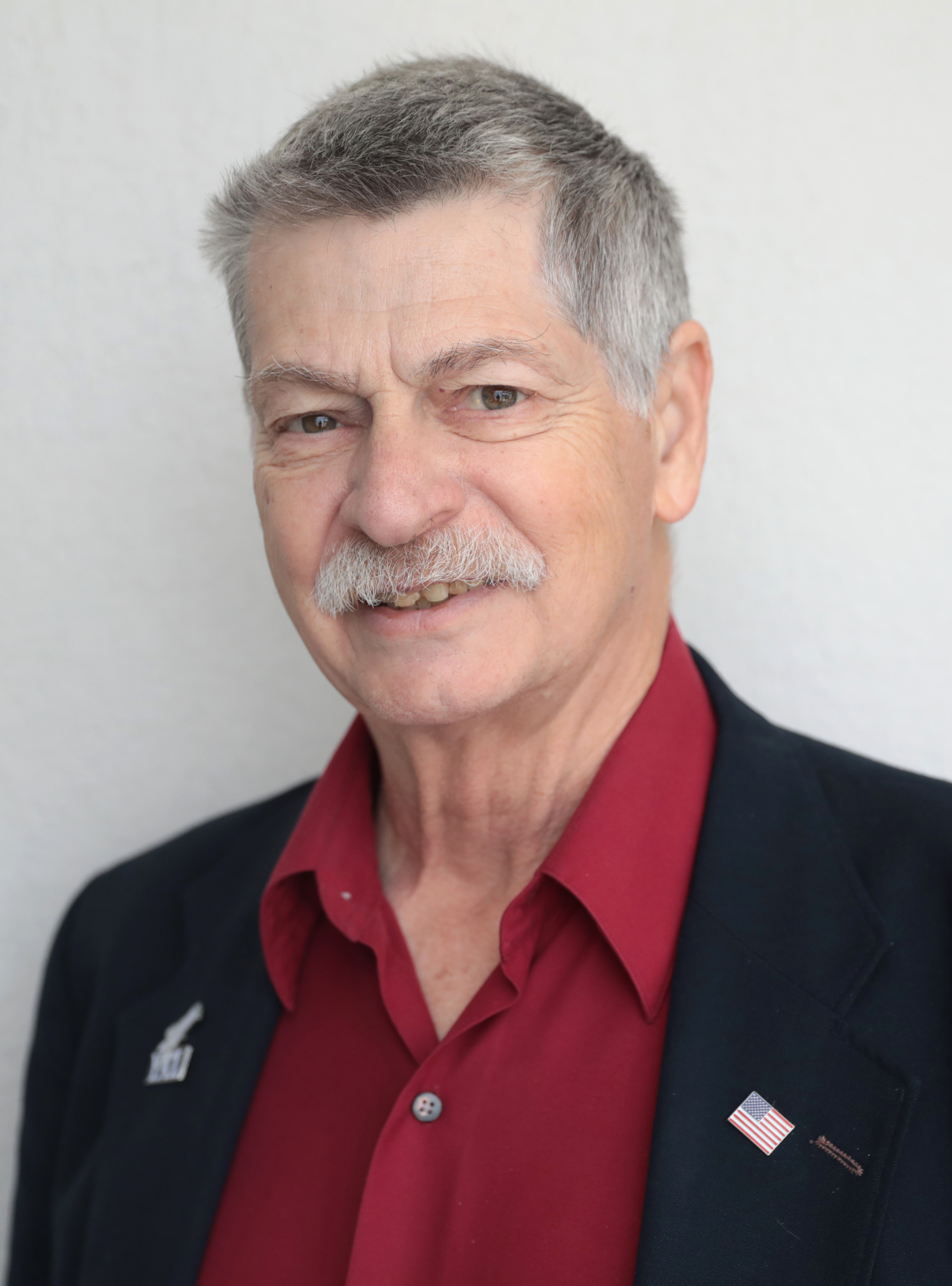
- Daniels in 2022

Member of the New Hampshire Senate from the 11th district
- In office December 2, 2020 – December 7, 2022
- Preceded by: Shannon Chandley
- Succeeded by: Shannon Chandley
- In office December 3, 2014 – December 5, 2018
- Preceded by: Peter Bragdon
- Succeeded by: Shannon Chandley

Member of the New Hampshire House of Representatives
- In office December 2012 – December 3, 2014
- Succeeded by: Keith Ammon
- Constituency: Hillsborough 40th
- In office December 2006 – December 2012
- Constituency: Hillsborough 6th
- In office December 1990 – December 2000

Personal details
- Born: May 16, 1954 (age 72) Needham, Massachusetts, U.S.
- Party: Republican
- Spouse: Loreen
- Children: 6
- Education: New Hampshire College (BS)

Military service
- Branch/service: United States Army
- Unit: New Hampshire Army National Guard (1979–1983); United States Army Reserve (1983–1988)

Gary L. Daniels (born May 16, 1954) is an American politician serving as a Republican member of the New Hampshire House of Representatives from Hillsborough 43rd district. He previously served as a member of the New Hampshire House of Representatives sporadically from 1990 through 2014, and served as a member of the New Hampshire Senate from 2014 to 2018, and most recently 2020 to 2022.

== Early life and education ==
Daniels was born in Needham, Massachusetts and raised in Milford, New Hampshire. He graduated from the Milford Area High School in 1972 and New Hampshire Technical Institute in 1974. He later earned a Bachelor of Science degree in management and information systems from New Hampshire College in 1982.

== Career ==
Daniels served in the United States Army from 1976 to 1979, the New Hampshire Army National Guard from 1979 to 1983, and the United States Army Reserve from 1983 to 1988. He has since worked as an insurance agent and served as a member of the Milford Board of Selectmen. Daniels was a member of the New Hampshire House of Representatives from 1990 to 2000, 2007 to 2012, and 2013 to 2014. He served as a member of the New Hampshire Senate from 2014 to 2018 and again starting in 2020.
