= GlobaLeaks =

Open-source, free software

- Stable release: 5.0.101 / 28 October 2026; 5 days ago
- Written in: Python, JavaScript
- Operating system: Linux
- License: Affero General Public License
- Website: https://www.globaleaks.org/
- Repository: https://github.com/globaleaks/GlobaLeaks

GlobaLeaks is a free and open source software intended to enable secure and anonymous whistleblowing initiatives.

Based on its design principle and threat model, the software is recognized as a Digital Public Good (DPG) by the Digital Public Goods Alliance.

== History ==
The project started on 15 December 2010, and the first software prototype was announced on 6 September 2011.

Relevant figures in the first development are Arturo Filastò, Claudio Agosti, Fabio Pietrosanti, Giovanni Pellerano, and Michele Orrù.

== Operation ==
GlobaLeaks utilizes Tor Onion Services to guarantee the anonymity of the source.

Once the submission is performed the data is encrypted and made available only to configured recipients. The platform does not store anything permanently. Information and files that are submitted are deleted as soon as possible due to a strict data retention policy.

The process is generally improved by suggesting sources and recipients to use Qubes OS or Tails operating systems while connecting to the platform.

== Implementations ==
By 2023, GlobaLeaks has been internationalized in over 90 languages and implemented by several thousand of projects and initiatives. The vast range of adopters include independent media, activists, media agencies, and corporations.

In 2013, Free Press Unlimited (FPU), a Netherlands-based non-profit organization, created Publeaks NL, a foundation that counts around 20 of the country's biggest media organizations among its members that uses the platform to perform investigative journalism under a same umbrella project.

FPU has replicated this model in other countries, creating MéxicoLeaks, IndonesiaLeaks, Leaks.ng and Kenekanko in Mexico, Indonesia, Nigeria and Mali respectively. MexicoLeaks aimed at revealing information for the public interest in Mexico, and was awarded the FRIDA award in 2016. Another project, Africaleaks, was discontinued.

AWP, a Belgium-based organization, created Ljost (Iceland), Filtrala (Spain), EcuadorTransparente (Ecuador) and PeruLeaks (Peru).

Considered one of the most successful GlobaLeaks projects, WildLeaks is the world's first whistleblower initiative dedicated to wildlife and forest crime funded and managed by the Elephant Action League (EAL) which reported and investigated various crimes. One of the investigations was highlighted in the award-winning Netflix documentary The Ivory Game.

GlobaLeaks also partnered with major anticorruption and human rights NGOs like Transparency International (Allerta Anticorruzione), OCCRP, and Amnesty International (Amlea).

In 2017, Xnet, an activist project which has been working on and for networked democracy and digital rights since 2008, launched the first public Anti-Corruption Complaint Box using anonymity protection technology like Tor and GlobaLeaks ("Bústia Ètica" in Catalan) in the Barcelona City Hall, making it the first municipal government to enable citizens to send information privately.

In 2018, the Italian Anti-Corruption Authority (ANAC), an administrative watchdog, launched their national online whistleblowing platform using GlobaLeaks and onion services.

Since 2020, the software is now recommended by Transparency International among the available solutions that could be used to implement whistleblowing systems for anti-corruption purposes.

== Funding ==
The GlobaLeaks project maintains public and transparent documentation of the funds and partners that have supported its research and development.

== See also ==
- Whistleblowing
- Digital public goods
- WikiLeaks
- SecureDrop
