= List of killings by law enforcement officers in the United States, September 2017 =

This is a list of people reported killed by non-military law enforcement officers in the United States in September 2017, whether in the line of duty or not, and regardless of reason or method. The listing documents the occurrence of a death, making no implications regarding wrongdoing or justification on the part of the person killed or officer involved. Killings are arranged by date of the incident that caused death. Different death dates, if known, are noted in the description. The table below lists 8 people.

== September 2017 ==
Date	Name (age) of deceased	Race	State (city)	Description
2017-09-22	Scott Farnsworth (28)	White	Arizona (Mesa)	Three Mesa Police officers shot and killed Farnsworth, an Army veteran who had PTSD and was holding a firearm. After the shooting, one of the officers that shot Farnsworth and another officer shot bean bag rounds at him, and a K9 officer released his dog to bite him.
2017-09-22	Dillan Tabares (27)	White	California (Huntington Beach)	Man shot dead after physical altercation with an officer. Possible "suicide by cop" case.
2017-09-19	Madgiel Sanchez (35)	Hispanic	Oklahoma (Oklahoma City)	An Oklahoma City police officer fatally shot a deaf, developmentally disabled man. The Oklahoma County District Attorney determined that the officer acted in self-defense and brought no charges, saying that Sanchez was "shot after failing to comply with officers' commands to drop a 2-foot metal pipe he was aggressively swinging while approaching the officers." Sanchez's family described the pipe as Sanchez's "trusted walking stick"; neighbors said that Sanchez used the pipe to communicate. During the confrontation, at least nine neighbors shouted that Sanchez was deaf and was unable to understand the officer, trying to get the officer's attention, "but less than a minute after the episode began, a second officer arrived and immediately pulled out his handgun." In front of the crowd, one officer fired his Taser at Sanchez and the second officer fired multiple shots with his handgun at Sanchez, who died at the scene. A neighbor who witnessed the shooting said, "'They seemed like they just came to shoot him. It happened so quickly."
2017-09-16	Scout Schultz (21)	White	Georgia (Atlanta)	Shooting of Scout Schultz: Schultz, an engineering student from Lilburn, Georgia, was fatally shot by a police officer outside a dormitory on the campus of Georgia Tech. "At least two students shared cellphone video showing the tense interaction between Schultz and Georgia Tech police officers" in which Schultz, who is holding a multipurpose tool with a knife (but without the blade extended), "yells at police to shoot and officers respond, 'Drop the knife! Drop the knife!' more than a dozen times" before the fatal shooting. Schultz left three suicide notes. The Fulton County District Attorney's Office "determined that there was no criminal conduct related to the actions of the officer."
2017-09-15	Jacob Dominguez (33)	Hispanic	California (San Jose)	Suspect in drive-by-shooting and seven day subsequent armed robbery, as well as a known gang member, was finally stopped by police who had been tracking him for over a week, after his second same day attempt to flee by running stop signs and driving into oncoming traffic. Once stopped, he at first showed his hands, then reached down into his car's floorboards at which point he was shot and killed.
2017-09-10	James Charles Cook (76)	White	North Carolina (Huntersville)	A medical patient at a hospital in Huntersville was shot dead after pointing a gun at officers who were called because he had fired a shot into a wall at the hospital. He was at the hospital for unknown reasons but he had recently been evacuated from Hurricane Irma. The shooting was ruled as justified after body-camera footage was released. The shooting occurred at Novant Health Huntersville Medical Center.
2017-09-10	Spencer James Hight (32)	White	Texas (Plano)	An officer responding to a report of shots fired encountered several dead victims in the backyard, and saw an active shooter inside the house. Upon entering the house and confronting the armed man, the officer shot and killed Hight, who had killed a total of eight individuals at that location.
2017-09-07	Eric Arnold (41)	Black	California (Sacramento)	Police pulled over Arnold, who was wanted for the murder of Erica Wallace and her teenage daughter Kiara LaSalle a week earlier. Police ordered Arnold to exit his truck, but after a brief hesitation Arnold opened fire. Officers shot back and hit him multiple times, killing him. Two officers were injured and treated for non-life-threatening-injuries afterwards.

== See also ==
- Death in custody § United States
- Henry A. Wallace Police Crime Public Database
- List of cases of police brutality
- List of countries with annual rates and counts for killings by law enforcement officers
- List of law enforcement officers killed in the line of duty in the United States
- List of law enforcement officers convicted for an on-duty killing in the United States
- List of shootings by US immigration agents
- List of police reforms related to the George Floyd protests
- List of unarmed African Americans killed by law enforcement officers in the United States
- Lists of killings by law enforcement officers
- Police brutality in the United States
- Police misconduct § United States
- Police riot § United States
- Police use of deadly force in the United States
