= Gabriel J. Martín =

Spanish psychologist, writer and LGBTI activist (born 1971)

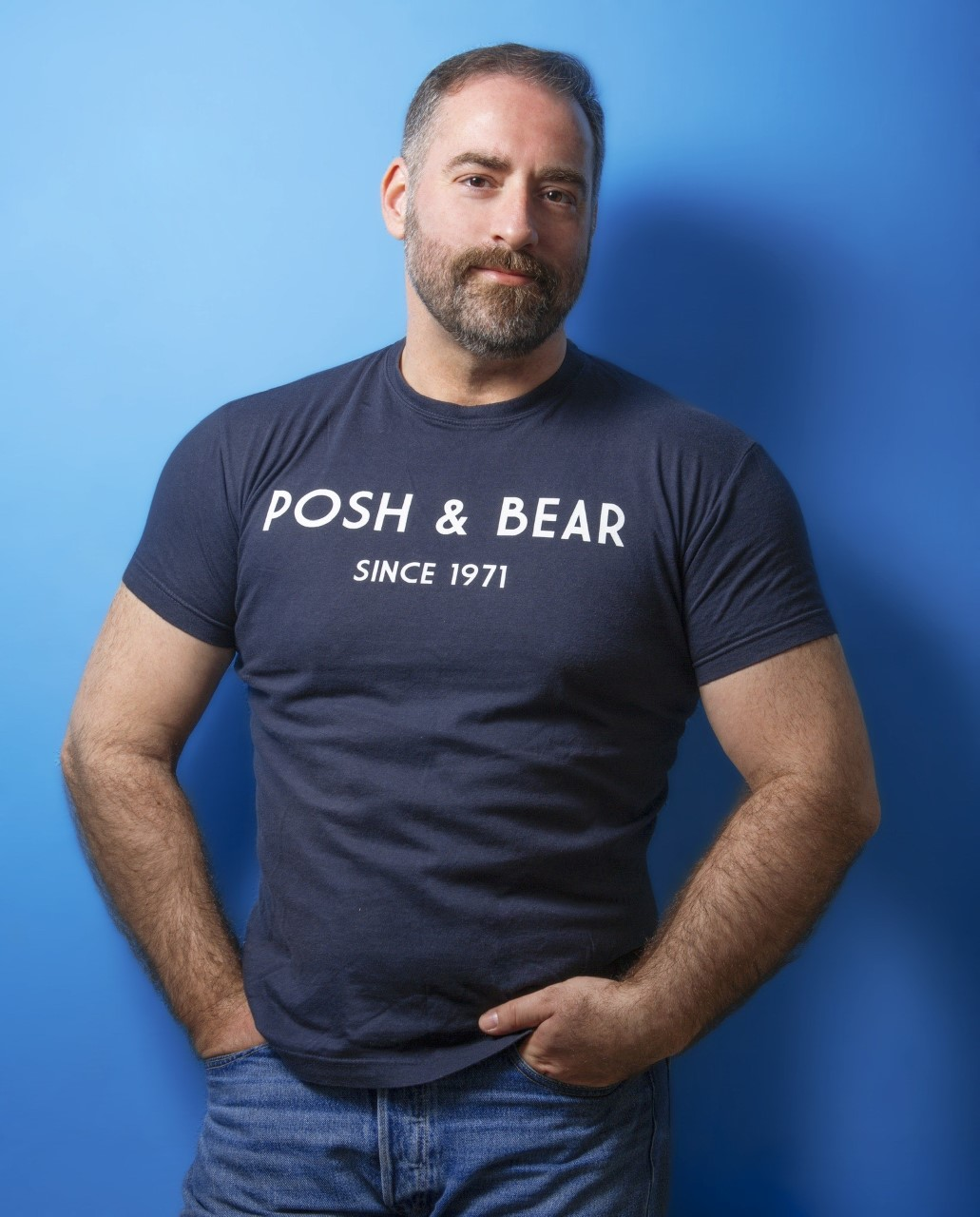
- Born: 12 July 1971 (age 55); San Fernando, Cádiz, Spain

Gabriel José Martín Martín (San Fernando, July 12, 1971) is a Spanish gay and intersex psychologist, writer and activist.

== Personal life ==
Gabriel J. Martín was assigned female at birth due to the appearance of his genitals. He was named Patricia and raised as a girl, although he never felt like one. However, when he reached adolescence, he began to develop male pattern of body hair and a beard, caused by internal testicles. At the age of 18, doctors determined that he was born with intersex genitalia and that he actually had hypospadias instead of a vagina.

After beginning a life as a man, he began a relationship with a woman. Although over time he realized that he was not heterosexual, breaking the relationship and moving to Barcelona, where he still resides at present. Martin has said that he would have had a better life if he had been operated on at birth.

== Education ==
In 1996, he graduated in psychology by the UNED, later he completed a postgraduate degree at the University of Girona. He devoted himself to the problems of homosexual men which — as he discerned from work experience — often differed from those of heterosexual men. Moreover, he trained as a volunteer and activist in the Gay-Lesbian Management of Catalonia.

== Career ==
He is an expert in gay affirmative psychology, with which he helps other gay men to overcome their internalized homophobia or to be able to come out of the closet in their environment.

In addition to advising homosexual men, he is a representative of the Spanish Council of Psychology in the LGTB office of the American Psychological Association (APA). He is also president of the LGTB Affirma't association, coordinator of the LGTB Affirmative Psychology working group of the Col·legi Oficial de Psicologia de Catalunya and collaborates with several radio and television channels.

== Publications ==
- Martín, Gabriel J. (2016). Quiérete mucho, maricón. Manual de éxito psicoemocional para hombres homosexuales. Roca. ISBN 978-84-16498-65-9.
- — (2017). El ciclo del amor marica. Relaciones de pareja (y soltería feliz) para hombres homosexuales. Roca. ISBN 978-84-16867-44-8.
- —; Martín, Sebas (2018). Sobrevivir al ambiente. Porque salir del armario no era más que el principio. Roca. ISBN 978-84-17167-43-1.
- — (2020). Gay Sex. Manual sobre sexualidad y autoestima erótica para hombres homosexuales. Roca. ISBN 978-84-18014-43-7.
