= Killing of Scout Schultz =

Fatal shooting of 21-year-old student

- Date: September 16, 2017
- Location: 532 8th Street NW, Atlanta, Georgia, U.S.
- Participants: 4 Georgia Tech Police Department officers, including Tyler Beck
- Deaths: Scout Schultz

On September 16, 2017, Scout Schultz, a 21-year-old student of the Georgia Institute of Technology, was shot once and killed by Tyler Beck, an officer of the Georgia Tech Police Department. Schultz had summoned police to the scene by making a false claim that someone was standing outside their dorm with a knife and a gun. They then stood outside the dorm carrying a multitool. When the police arrived, Schultz walked towards the police, asking them to shoot. The multitool contained a screwdriver and a short blade that was not out.

The incident was followed by protests and civil unrest, which led to multiple arrests. Schultz's parents filed a wrongful death suit. The shooting was investigated by the Georgia Bureau of Investigation. In March 2020, it was announced that Tyler Beck would not face charges.

In 2018, Scout's shooting led to the creation of a $1,000,000 fund to improve mental health, from which came the Intercollegiate Mental Health Conference, the first student-run national conference on college mental health policy at Georgia Tech. This led to the creation of a new LGBTQ+ center and other resources.

== Background ==
Scout Schultz was born in Rockville, Maryland in 1995. and was born with a possible intersex condition. The Schultz family later moved to Lilburn, Georgia.

Scout was a fourth year computer engineering major at Georgia Institute of Technology, and expected to graduate a semester early according to their father. Scout identified as bisexual, nonbinary, and intersex and used singular they pronouns. Schultz was the president of Pride Alliance on campus.

Schultz, who suffered from clinical depression, had spent time in counseling after attempting suicide by hanging in 2015.

== Shooting ==
Schultz, a 21-year-old student at the Georgia Institute of Technology, called 9-1-1 on September 16, 2017, around 11:17 p.m. claiming there was a suspicious person on campus with a knife and possibly a gun. Schultz gave a description matching their own appearance, saying that the person had long blond hair, a white t-shirt, and blue jeans, and said that the person might be intoxicated.

Four police officers approached Schultz outside a dormitory on campus. Schulz had a multitool, which included a small knife, but no gun. According to the Atlanta Journal-Constitution, the multitool's blade was not extended. However, given the earlier call and the lack of light, the police suspected that it was a gun. Schultz refused to drop the multitool and walked towards the police, with arms hanging down, while shouting "shoot me!" Schultz was then shot and pronounced dead shortly after at the Grady Memorial Hospital. The incident was captured on a cell-phone video.

Three suicide notes were found in Schultz's dorm room.

The police officer who shot them was identified as Tyler Beck. According to the Atlanta Journal-Constitution, "Beck was certified by the Georgia Peace Officer and Standards Training Council (POST) but had not undergone Crisis Intervention Training, which trains police on how to handle mentally ill suspects." Shortly after the shooting, Beck was put on paid leave.

== Aftermath ==
Schultz's family attorney, Chris Stewart, said that the police overreacted. Stewart said the idea that the death was a "suicide by cop" did not justify the shooting. He also said, "The area was secured. There was no one around at risk." Schultz's mother, Lynne Schultz, suggested that the police should have used pepper spray or Tasers instead of gunning them down. (According to a spokesman, Georgia Tech police are equipped with pepper spray, but not tasers.) Scout's father, William Schultz, said at a news conference, "Why did you have to shoot? That's the only question that matters right now. Why did you kill my son?"

G. P. "Bud" Peterson, the president of Georgia Tech, said the shooting was a "heart-wrenchingly painful time" for the university. Despite Schultz not finishing senior year, Georgia Tech awarded Schultz a diploma.

The shooting was investigated by the Georgia Bureau of Investigation. In September 2018, with the investigation still on-going, the parents announced that they had grown frustrated with the lack of criminal charges. Schultz's parents filed a wrongful death suit naming the university, Tyler Beck, and the Georgia Board of Regents in September 2019.

In March 2020, the county's district attorney announced that Beck would not face charges, saying that, according to use-of-force experts, the shooting was justified.

In December 2021, Georgia Tech announced a settlement with the family of Schultz for $1 million.

== Vigil and protest ==
A peaceful vigil for Schultz was held on campus on September 18, 2017.

Twenty minutes later, about 50 protesters marched through campus while carrying a banner which read "Protect LGBTQ" and chanting "Justice Now". The protest turned violent and a police car was set on fire. Three people were arrested, one of them a Georgia Tech student. They were charged with "inciting a riot and battery of an officer." In the following weeks three more people were arrested for "misdemeanor obstruction of law enforcement." Schultz's parents appealed for calm.

On September 22, a teach-in and protest occurred at Georgia Tech, which led to the Student Center building being closed early at 3 p.m.

== Legacy and impact ==
In 2018, in response to Schultz's death, queer student leaders established the Mental Health Joint Allocations Committee, a $1,000,000 fund, stating it exists to improve campus mental health. These funds have been allocated towards a new LGBTQ+ center, telemental health services, therapeutic biotechnologies, and health systems research.

In February 2019, the committee contributed funds to the Intercollegiate Mental Health Conference, the first national student-run research initiative to identify best practices and policies for college mental health. From this data, $300,000 in grant funding was established to improve the mental health of vulnerable populations.

== See also ==
- List of killings by law enforcement officers in the United States, September 2017
- Suicide by cop
