= Elephant Action League =

The Elephant Action League (EAL) is an environmental non-governmental organization founded in 2013 in the United States by Andrea Crosta, Gilda Moratti, and Francesco Rocca. EAL is based in Los Angeles, California.

== WildLeaks project ==
The EAL, along with other organizations including the Environmental Investigation Agency (UK), the Oxpeckers Center (South Africa), EcoJust (the Netherlands), Global Eye (Africa and Southeast Asia), 100Reporters, and others, maintain WildLeaks, an online environmental whistleblower platform. The site facilitates the collection of confidential information through a Tor-based online platform, where users can securely share anonymous tips about wildlife crime, which are then reviewed by experts. кЭЕщ

== China investigation ==
EAL performed a 10-month undercover investigation documenting the areas where illegal ivory opportunistically enters the legal ivory market in Hong Kong and mainland China. EAL published a report of the investigation in December 2015, called China’s Old Loopholes, New Hopes.
