= Diagonal (newspaper) =

Biweekly newspaper

- Type: Alternative biweekly newspaper
- Format: Tabloid
- Owner(s): Independent (Grassroots)
- Publisher: Nonprofit "Asociación Punto y Coma Comunicación y Prensa"
- Founded: March 3, 2005
- Political alignment: Left-wing
- Language: Spanish
- Ceased publication: December 2016
- Headquarters: Plaza de Luca de Tena 13, Madrid, Spain
- Country: Spain
- Circulation: 15,000
- Website: diagonalperiodico.net

Diagonal was a Spanish biweekly alternative newspaper, covering breaking news, culture, political analysis from a grassroots approach. It presents itself as a communication tool for the left-leaning social movements, and as a "critical and independent media, without directors or bosses, resting on the base of thousands of subscribers". In 2017 it was renamed El Salto after its merge with 20 other media, such as Pikara Magazine or El Salmón Contracorriente.

== History ==
Diagonal can be traced back to 2003, when the grassroots collective editing the monthly newspaper "Molotov" decides to cease publication and start a broader newspaper. This initiative was joined by a wide spectrum of journalists and activists that formed the first promoter group. After two promotional issues, Diagonal started on March 3, 2005, date since it has continued being published regularly. Diagonal is considered one of the emerging newspapers in Spain which challenges the traditional newspapers represented by the Spanish Newspaper Publishers' Association, of which Diagonal is not part of.

Diagonal has regularly used crowdfunding as a funding source. He has launched three campaigns, all successful, in 2011, 2014 and 2015, receiving 20K€, 70K€ and 12K€ respectively. The first one was considered a successful microfinancing experiment for emerging media in Spain. The second one established a record of funds, collaborations and time of the campaign in the open crowdfunding site Goteo. The third one, the first common publication across two major independent Spanish newspapers, i.e. Diagonal and La Marea.

In 2012, it launched a reduced English version, "Diagonal English" with the help of volunteer translators.

In 2014, Diagonal, as part of the Associated Whistleblowing Press, together with other media, launched the first local whistleblowing platform in Spain, Filtrala (which means "leak it").

In 2016, Diagonal launched a binding enquiry to its subscribers, asking them to decide if Diagonal should perform a merge with 20 other alternative Spanish media in order to build a co-operatively owned online daily newspaper. With the 97.5% of support, Diagonal has opened a 6-month process named "Great Leap Forward" (mocking the 60s Chinese campaign). Eventually, this process ended in 2017 with the establishment of the new newspaper El Salto.

== Edition and funding ==
It is edited by the nonprofit Asociación Punto y Coma Comunicación y Prensa, explicitly created for this purpose. Its contents are released under the license Creative Commons Attribution Share-Alike. It is funded through reader subscriptions, direct sale, ethical advertisement, donations and commercialization of articles with the newspaper image.

== Local editions ==
Diagonal has local editions in several Spanish regions, in particular Andalucía, Aragón, Asturias, Cantabria and Galicia.

== See also ==
- El Salto (newspaper)
