= June Fernández =

Feminist journalist

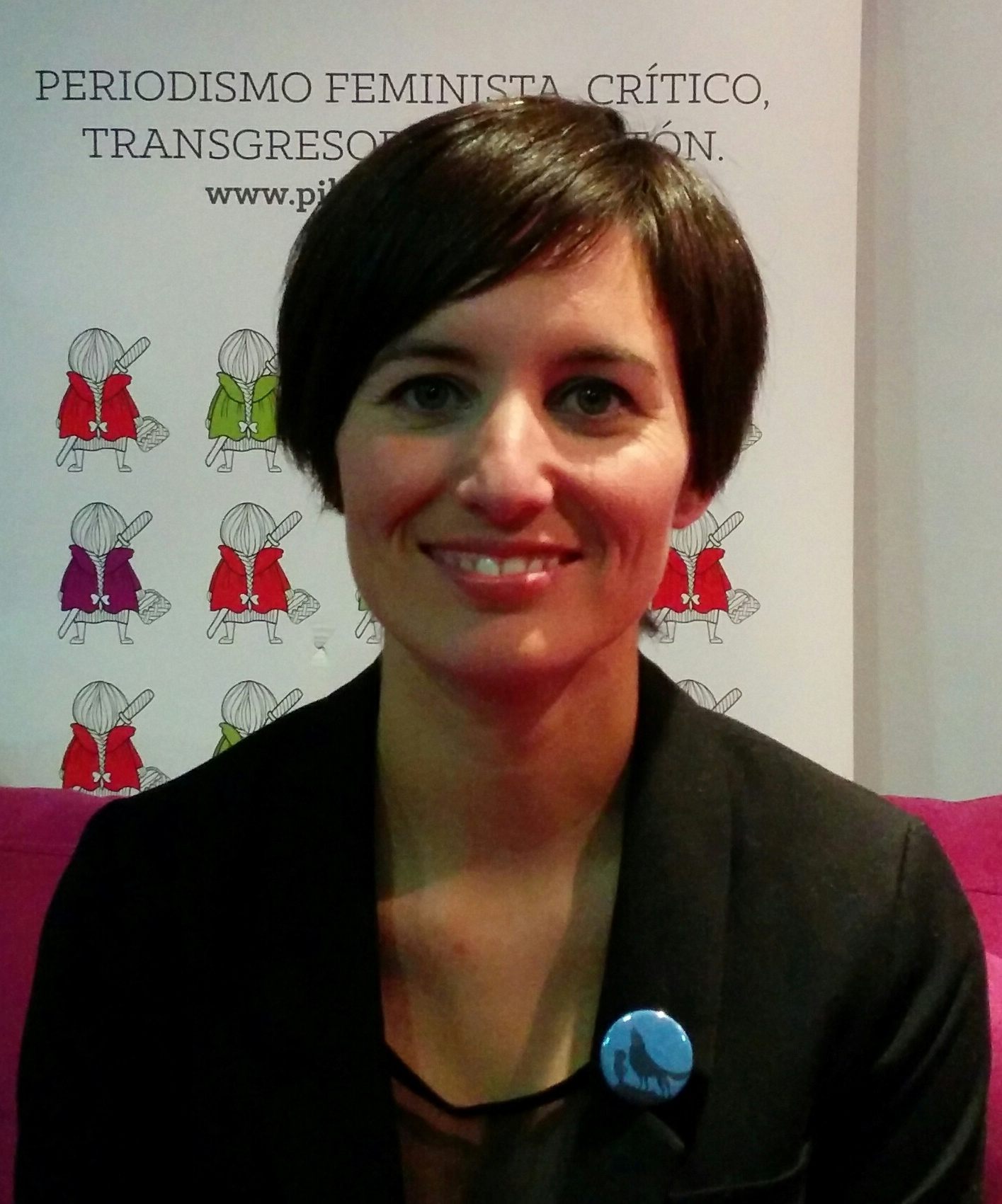
- Born: 7 December 1984 (age 41); Bilbao, Spain
- Occupation: Journalist
- Known for: Co-founding Pikara Magazine
- Children: 1

June Fernández Casete (born 7 December 1984) is a Spanish journalist. She is a co-founder and the director of the feminist Pikara Magazine.

== Life and work ==
Fernández was born in Bilbao in 1984. As a child she would interview her grandmother as part of her ambition to work for the newspaper El País. She graduated in journalism from the University of the Basque Country and then briefly lived in Nicaragua. She fulfilled her ambition when she started work for El País in 2006. Leaving there in 2009 she joined, and was till 2011, an advocate and publicist for SOS Racisme Biscay. Her support continued in 2020 when she spoke up in support of the end of xenophobia in the Basque country.

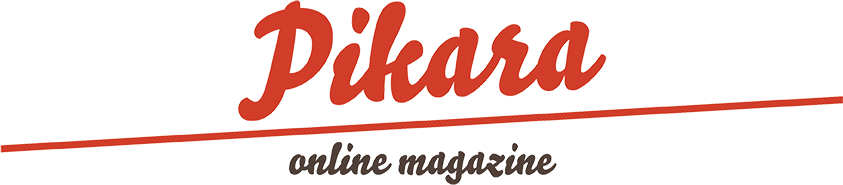
Pikara Magazine has a creative commons license

Pikara Magazine was founded in November 2010 by four journalists from the Equal Journalism Network: Maite Asensio Lozano, Itziar Abad, Lucía Martínez Odriozola and Fernández.

She started blogging moving on to the alternative fortnightly newspaper Diagonal.

In 2020 she published Abrir el Melon, which translates as "Open the Melon". The book concerns a decade of female journalism. Fernandez has said that with respect to the title, she considers "melons tasty, sometimes bitter and addictive... and that she will open more".

She became the director of the Pikara Magazine and in 2021 she was on the magazine's coordination team with Andrea Momoitio, Mª Ángeles Fernández and account keeper Tamia Quima Morales.

In March 2022 she was amongst 151 international feminists signing Feminist Resistance Against War: A Manifesto, in solidarity with the Russian Feminist Anti-War Resistance. (Note: This manifesto was criticized by both Ukrainian feminists and members of the Feminist Anti-War Resistance themselves.)

== Personal life ==
In 2014, Fernandez was listed among 50 LGBT Spanish people of influence by Spanish LGBT blog Hay una Lesbiana en mi Sopa. She has a daughter.

== Awards ==
She and Pikara Magazine have gained a number of awards. She wrote an article about intersexuality titled (in translation) "Will it be a boy or a girl?" and this won a journalism prize from the European Commission. The piece was linked with her interview with intersex and trans activist Mauro Cabral Grinspan and another interview with Spanish intersex psychologist Gabriel Martín.

In 2013 she wrote an article titled "“Yo quería sexo, pero no así” ("I Wanted Sex But Not Like That") that discussed when a "desired encounter turns into a sexual assault". She won a 2013 Colombine Award after it was published in Pikara Magazine and elDiario.es in November 2012. The judges welcomed that it was a subject not usually addressed in mainstream media. Victims of sexual assault can be confused by a mistaken "guilt". They can feel responsible, because they agreed to a date or they drank heavily, into thinking that a rape was their fault. Moreover the subject can be seen as taboo and the victim doesn't share and talk about what happened.

The Spanish Association of Women in the Media (Ameco) also gave her their Prensa-Mujer award for her contribution to increasing equality in 2013. She received the award together with the Galician radio journalist Mariola Lourido and Patricia Simón of the digital newspaper "Periodismo Humano".

== Works ==
- 10 Ungovernables: Stories of Transgression and Rebellion
- Open the Melon, 2020
